= Grizedale College, Lancaster =

Constituent college of the University of Lancaster

Coordinates: 54.00695°N 2.78549°W

Grizedale College
- University of Lancaster
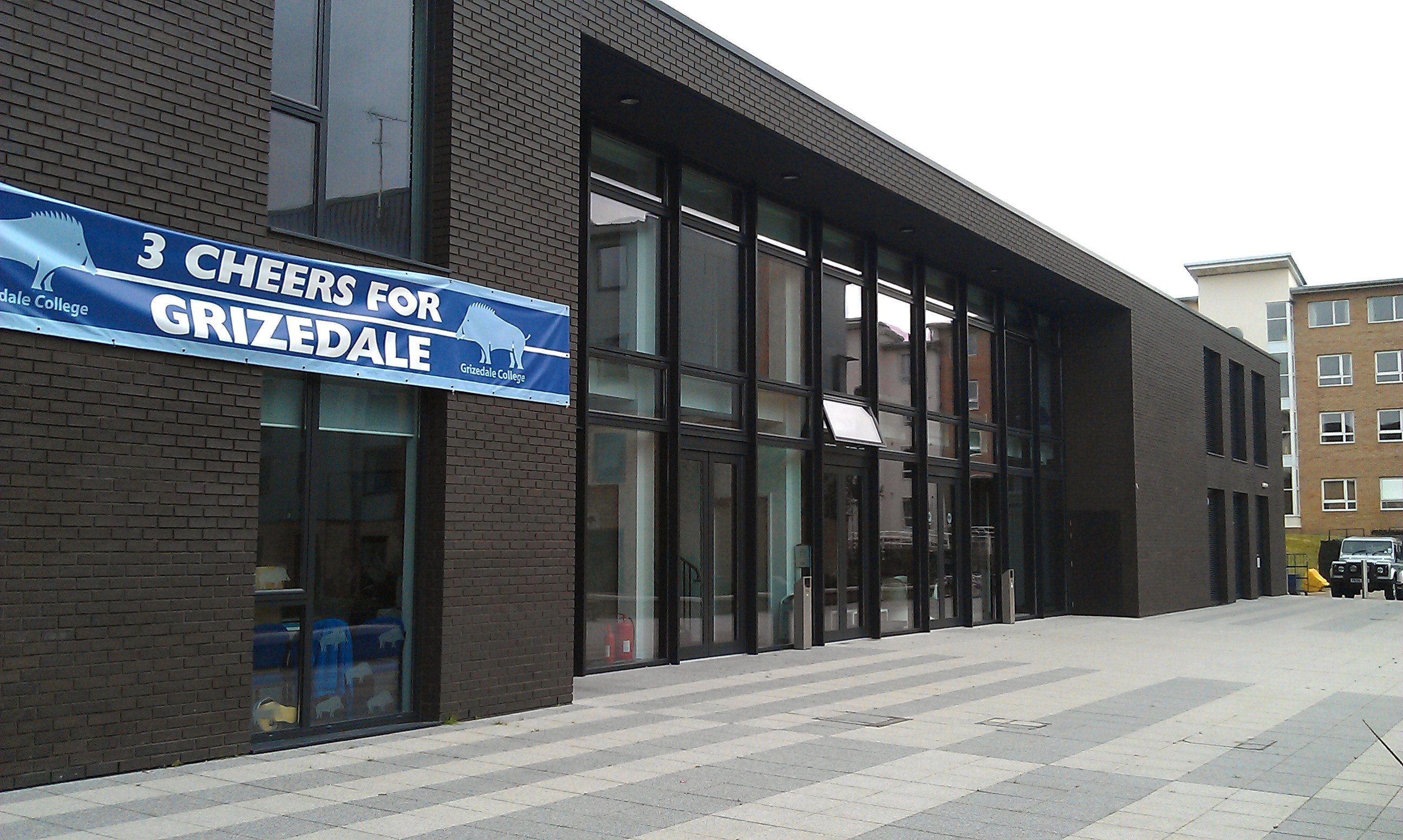

- The Grizedale Boar
- Motto: Never Forget
- Established: 1975
- Named for: Grizedale Forest
- Principal: Dr Karen Wright
- JCR president: Haneef Shittu
- Undergraduates: 1478

Grizedale College is a college of the University of Lancaster in Lancashire, England. The college is named after the Grizedale Forest area of Lancashire North of the Sands. When it was built it was situated at the southern extremity of the Bailrigg campus. The development of the south west campus has meant that college is now considered to be one of the more centrally located colleges. It is currently the fifth largest in terms of number of students.

== History ==
Depravo the Rat, former school mascot

Grizedale was one of the last colleges to be built on the Bailrigg campus in 1974. It initially shared accommodation and administration with Pendle College. Grizedale was in the old 'E' Block and Pendle in the old 'J' block. This arrangement continued until Grizedale took over 'J Block' in 1993, and new accommodation to the south of Grizedale, originally intended for Grizedale itself, was completed for Pendle in 1994.

The Grizedale boar was only recently inaugurated as the college mascot. Originally, Depravo the rat, a character invented by Michael Palin in his book ‘Bert Fegg's Nasty book for boys and girls’, represented the college. An early member of college staff was friendly with Mr Palin who granted the college the rights to the character and Depravo the Rat became Grizedale’s mascot. The boar became the second mascot in the late 1980s when a number of parents questioned the relevance of Depravo and the Grizedale boar was created. Since 2000 the boar has become the main mascot of the college, although the bar still retained the name 'Depravos' until it was demolished in 2007.

== Redevelopment ==
Grizedale's New Accommodation - Town house on the site of the former 'J' Block

The original college accommodation 'E' and 'J' blocks were demolished in summer 2006. Problems with other building projects on campus meant that the site of the former buildings laid vacant for almost all of the 2006/07 academic year. As a result of these delays college students were housed in other buildings around campus including Pendle's George Fox Building, Pendle Main, Graduate College and Bowland Tower. The new buildings were finally completed in time for Michaelmas term of the 2008/09 academic year. These new buildings are composed of 12 person townhouses and 6 person apartments as opposed to the corridor block arrangements of the original accommodation.

Depravo's, along with the college's offices and porters' lodge, was demolished after the graduation party for the 2007 graduates in July 2007. It was rebuilt and reopened at the start of the 2009 academic year, and stripped of its former name and mascot, renamed simply 'Grizedale Café Bar'.

== Facilities ==
The college houses a recently renovated bar, junior and senior common rooms and accommodation blocks and a laundrette.

Central to the college has always been the college bar, originally known as 'The World's End' as Grizedale was the southernmost college on campus and later as 'Depravos'. This was home to a number of famous campus events, including the 'Shite' Disco, the gZ Centurion and many others, getting Grizedale the reputation as the Social College. The college bar was redeveloped and reopened in 2009. The original, iconic mural that had adorned the old bar's staircase was relocated to the University Chaplaincy Centre, and was replaced with photos taken in Grizedale Forest by former college principal Andrew Okey.

== Symbols ==
The official college song, adopted as the result of a vote by the JCR membership, is "Never Forget" as performed by Take That. The college has two mascots - Depravo the rat, the rights to which were granted to the college by Michael Palin and, since 2000, the Grizedale Boar.

== Social Events ==
Grizedale college has a reputation for being a sociable college, attracting students from other colleges in the evening for events often held at Grizedale Bar. Events are organised by the JCR - Events such as Take Me Out, Quizzes and Extrav; as well as many socials throughout the university hosting events at the bar. Currently, there is a permanent 2-for-1 all-day everyday cocktail menu, including Sex on the Beach, Long Island Iced Tea, Cosmopolitan, White Russian, Lynchburg Lemonade, Woo Woo and Blue Lagoon, which costs £6.95 for two of any type. However, through the week there are also different cocktail offers depending on the day of the week. Mondays have gin offers, Tuesdays are hardshakes including a range of milkshake cocktails, Wednesday is Captain Gilligan’s Rumshack, Thursdays are martinis, Fridays are prosecco cocktails and Saturdays are sours. In terms of food, currently, the bar sells a range of different types of nachos, such as cheesy, barbeque, Mexican vegetarian and have begun selling Frenchos, which includes pita bread, cranberry sauce and camembert.

At present, the bar is open for service from 4 pm until close, depending on how busy the bar is, from Monday-Saturday, being closed on Sundays/ However, students can enter the bar in mornings to play pool or darts and use the tables.

== Governance ==
Grizedale, like many of her sister colleges, has found redevelopment and inconsistent Presidencies a major cause for concern. In 2009 reform was passed through the student union to allow the vice-president to sit alongside the President in Union Council, the senior student council.

All presidents sit on both Senate and Court, only two of the nine college vice-presidents who are elected as Senate representatives through Academic Council, may also hold full seats on both Senate and Court. This role is completely autonomous from their college role and as such may mandate their presidents should a vote be requested on court matters.

All members of the executive sit on student union sub-committees including: President's Committee Vice-President's Committee both sit on UnionCouncil, Extrav Sub etc. Academic Council Chair Committee/Elections Sub-committee Wel-Comm Inter College Sport i.e. George Wyatt

Grizedale College has proven itself to be a powerful college in the transition of JCR executive presidents to the student union, with Chris Cottam, Graeme Poulton and Dwayne Branch all successfully running for office. In the summer term of 2009 former social secretary Victoria (Torri) Crapper was elected vice president for welfare in the new LUSU Sabbatical make-up. In 2010 former president Chaz Ginn and former VP Paul Lynch were candidates for the welfare and academic vice-presidencies, but both lost in close elections. Grizedale prides itself on the activism of its members, with the former bar depicting the storming of University House in an elaborate mural that lined the stairs to the JCR space, based on a World War II photograph. It is expected that once restored to its former glory, the college will once again be one of the most politically vocal on the Campus.

== Sport ==
The Inter-College Carter Shield has been won on two occasions, in 2005 and 2009. With many of the college JCR members representing their both University and College teams, with the support of the SCR, the first Grizedale College Colours for sport were awarded at the Christmas Ball of 2006 and the tradition has carried on, with the Sports Reps choosing a suitable candidate for both Colours for Excellence and Extraordinary Commitment.

In addition to the Colours the Victoria Stockton memorial cup is awarded to a student displaying the most commitment to college sport. The cup was presented by Victoria's parents to Fr. Hugh Pollock in memory of their daughter who was the first sports representative in the college to win the coveted Carter Shield; and who died in the summer of 2006. The recipients are nominated by the Sports Reps before being approved by College Council.

A number of former College Colours recipients have gone on to receive university full colours and an England shirt belonging to rugby league player Tom Lever is on display alongside the former president's board in the Porter's Lodge of the college.

In 2018 the first Grizedale College member won the sportswoman of the year award. Moreover, Grizedale’s football and netball teams are some of the best in the university, with alumnus Rory Marrow leading the college to an unbeaten league triumph in 2019.

== Notable alumni ==
- Satnam Rana, Television presenter
- Liam Gerrard, Actor
