= Leila Musavian =

British electrical engineer

Leila Musavian is a professor of Wireless Communications in the School of Computer Science and Electronic Engineering at the University of Essex.

== Education and career ==
Musavian earned a Ph.D. through the Centre for Telecommunications Research at King's College London. Her 2006 doctoral dissertation was The effects of correlated antennas and imperfect channel knowledge on MIMO systems. She became a postdoctoral researcher at INRS-EMT, a research center for Energy, Materials and Telecommunications in Canada affiliated with the Université du Québec, from 2006 to 2008. She continued her research at Loughborough University in the UK from 2009 to 2010, and at McGill University in Canada from 2011 to 2012.

Next, in 2012, she obtained a position as a lecturer in Lancaster University's InfoLab21, a research centre on information and communication technologies. She was promoted to senior lecturer in 2016, and in the same year moved to the University of Essex as reader in telecommunications. At Essex, she served as CSEE Deputy Director of Research from 2017 to 2019, and as Deputy Pro-Vice-Chancellor for Research from 2019 to 2020. She was named Professor of Wireless Communications in 2020.
