= Raoni Rajão =

Environment and agriculture policy expert, academic, and author

- Occupations: Environment and agriculture policy expert, academic, and author

Academic background
- Education: BS., Computer Science; PhD., Organisation, Work and Technology
- Alma mater: Università degli Studi di Milano-Bicocca; Lancaster University
- Thesis: Objects, boundaries and joint work The role of geographic information systems in the formulation and enforcement of deforestation control policies in Amazonia (2011)

Academic work
- Institutions: Federal University of Minas Gerais

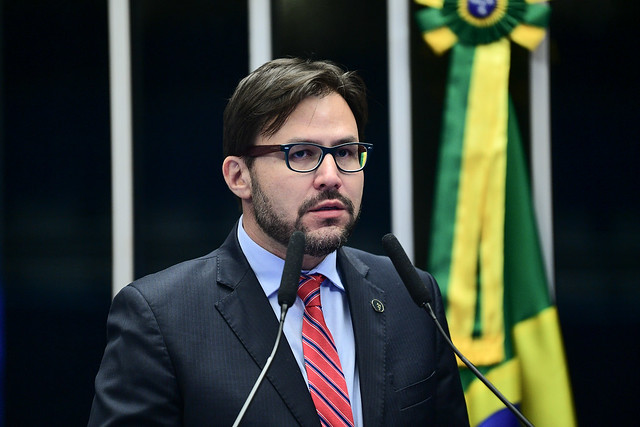
Dr. Raoni Rajão during a hearing at the Brazilian Senate

Raoni Guerra Lucas Rajão (August 1, 1981) is a Brazilian environmental scientist and associate professor in environmental management and social studies of science & technology in the Department of Production Engineering at the Federal University of Minas Gerais (UFMG) in Brazil. He is an affiliated member of the Brazilian Academy of Science (ABC), Global Future Council on Forest Economy from the World Economic Forum and Non-Resident Senior Fellow at the Brazil Program from the Inter-American Dialogue in the U.S. He worked as Director of the Department of Policies to Deforestation and Burning Control of the Ministry of Environment and Climate Change, in Brazil, between January 2023 and December 2024, being one of the responsible for the plans to control deforestation and the REDD+ agenda.

He and his colleagues at UFMG created the SeloVerde, a governmental compliance monitoring and traceability platform. SeloVerde was adopted by the state governments of Pará, Minas Gerais and Espirito Santo, Acre, Tocantins, Mato Grosso do Sul and Maranhão.

He has been taking part in the international discussions about climate change and sustainability at United Nations Conference of the Parties since 2014 and, along his career, has collaborated with agencies of the United Nations, Inter-American Development Bank, and the German Technical Cooperation (GIZ). He has advised Brazilian government employees regarding environmental policies.

According to Bori Agency and Overtone, Prof. Rajão is among the 50 most influential Brazilian researchers in public policy worldwide.

== Career ==
Rajão holds a degree in Computer Science from the University of Milano-Bicocca(2005), in Italy, a Master's in Information Technology, Change Management (2007) and a Ph.D. in Organization, Work and Technology (2011) both from Lancaster University, in England. In 2011, he started working as an adjunct professor at the Federal University of Minas Gerais. There he founded, in 2012, the Laboratory of Environmental Services Management (LAGESA). In 2022, he became vice-coordinator of the Centre for Remote Sensing (CSR) at UFMG. Rajão is also a professor at the Post-Graduate Programs in Production Engineering and Analysis and Modeling of Environmental Systems at UFMG.

Since his years as a Master's student, his work focuses on the relationship between science, technology and public policies, especially in the ones concerning environmental issues such as climate and deforestation.

After publishing an article that exposed how much soy and beef contaminated with deforestation was exported from Brazil to the European Union in 2020, Rajão and his colleagues started to work, in 2021, alongside the state governments of Pará and Minas Gerais, Brazil, to develop SeloVerde. Since then, SeloVerde has also been adopted by the state government of Espirito Santo and Acre, and is under development in Tocantins, Maranhão and Mato Grosso do Sul. The public platform for transparency and traceability of supply chains has been recognized by the EU as a leading example initiative.

== Awards ==
In 2022, Rajão and eleven colleagues received the Amílcar Herrera prize of the Latin-American Association of Social Studies of Science and Technology (ESOCITE) for the article "The risk of fake controversies for Brazilian environmental policies". The group found out evidences that a group of researchers led by Evaristo de Miranda was creating false scientific controversies that impacted negatively on Brazilian environmental and health policies.

The SeloVerde platform created by Profs. Rajão, Britaldo Soares-Filho and their team at UFMG has been awarded a Global Technical Recognition by FAO.

He was recognised as Brazil's top 50 most influential researchers to public policy.
