= Lancaster University Chaplaincy Centre =

Building in Lancaster, Lancashire

Coordinates: 54.011331°N 2.7869717°W

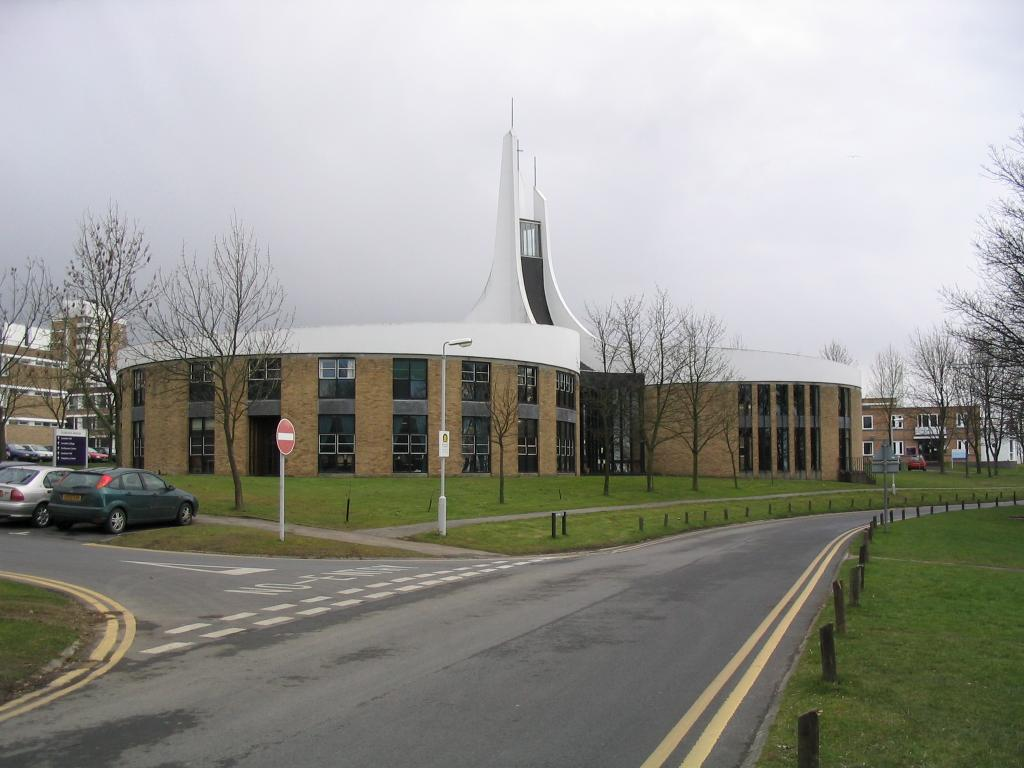
The Chaplaincy Centre in 2004

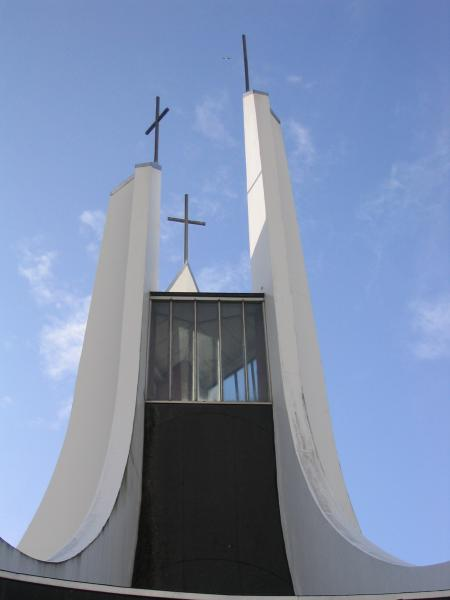
Spire of the Chaplaincy Centre

Lancaster University Chaplaincy Centre, on the campus of Lancaster University in the United Kingdom brings together the many faith groups represented on the campus and in the wider community.

== History ==
When the university was being designed, the architect Gabriel Epstein suggested a site to the north-west of Alexandra Square for a chapel, potentially linked to University House. The Anglican Bishop of Blackburn, the Roman Catholic Bishop of Lancaster, and the Rev. G. A. Maland (representing the free churches) held discussions together and agreed to retain the Preston-based firm Cassidy & Ashton, who specialised in religious buildings, as architects. Later, these churches were joined by the Jewish community, and the University Grants Committee agreed to help with the cost of fees and fittings for the social areas.

Built in 1968−1969, the Chaplaincy Centre consists of three circular lobes with a three pronged spire, intended to embody an aspirational ecumenical spirit and representing the coming together of the three Christian denominations of Anglicanism, Catholicism and Nonconformism. The Chaplaincy Centre's spire was the basis of the university's 1989 logo, introduced in the university's silver jubilee.

Similar facilities exist at the universities of Dundee and Bath. However, very few universities in the United Kingdom have such purpose built facilities. Lancaster was the first such joint centre in the United Kingdom.

== Interior details ==
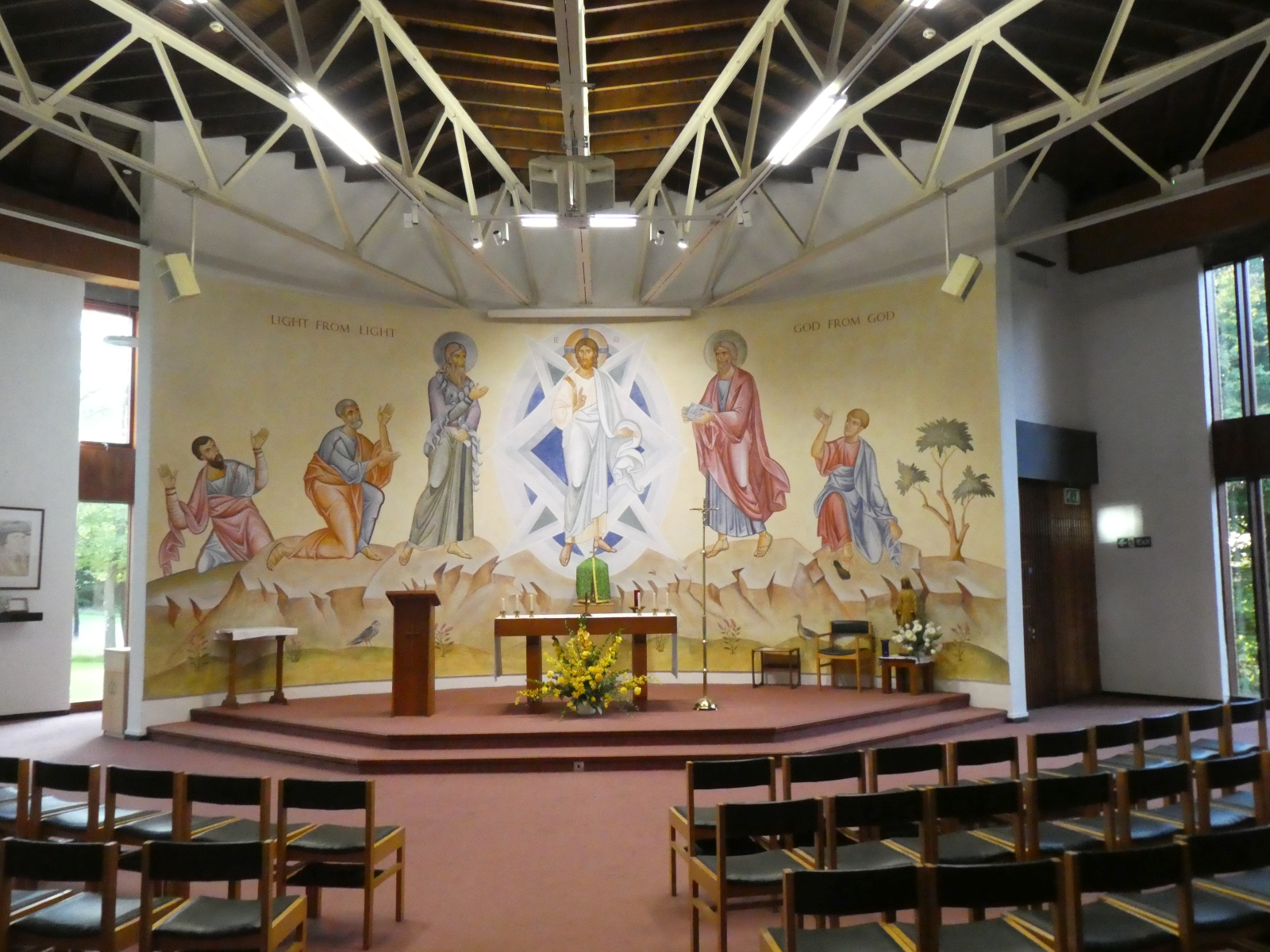
Fresco in the Catholic chapel

At the insistence of the Catholic Diocese of Lancaster, the Catholic chapel is separate to the chapel shared by Anglican and Free Church Christians, but moveable screens mean that both chapels can open up into the concourse for shared activities such as carol services. A portable organ, with one manual and four stops, was installed in 1983, and can be moved for use in either chapel or the concourse. Each chapel seats about 220 people.

The Anglican/Free Church chapel is decorated with a wooden sculpture behind the communion table, entitled "The Battle". Constructed by local artist, Jan Thorn, it is reminiscent of a crown of thorns. The wall behind the Catholic alter is decorated with a fresco-secco depicting the Transfiguration of Jesus, which was painted over 12 days in 2017 by the Eastern Orthodox iconographer Aidan Hart.

== Usage ==
The centre also includes a Buddhist Meditation Room and a Quiet Room used by Quakers. The centre hosts weekly Mindfulness sessions and serves as a meeting place for the Lancaster Jewish Society every Shabbat. Opposite the Chaplaincy Centre in Ash House are the university's Islamic prayer rooms.

The centre is also used as a polling station for local and national elections.
