= Coat of arms of Lancaster University =

Emblem of English university

The coat of arms of Lancaster University

The coat of arms of Lancaster University is the official emblem of Lancaster University, in Lancashire, England. It was granted to the university by Royal Charter on its establishment in 1964.

The coat of arms has several heraldic elements. Centrally positioned, a horizontal, wavy blue line refers to the River Lune, a prominent geographic landmark of the city of Lancaster. Secondly, the two red roses are symbols of the House of Lancaster (and the county of Lancashire) and are taken directly from the arms of the Lancashire County Council. The open book represents wisdom and the university's purpose as an institution of learning. Lastly, the Lion passant comes from the arms of the Duchy of Lancaster.

The arms, slightly modified, may be seen on the university's logo. The full coat of arms also appears on degree certificates and the jerseys of the university's sports teams.

== Blazon ==
The complete blazon is the arms surrounded by a 'coat'; the full coat of arms. In addition to the arms, the insignia contains quilled pens which refer to the learned activities of the university and the rams head, from which the pens protrude, comes from the county of Westmorland. The supporting bull comes from the arms of Cumberland Council and the dragon represents the ancient Cumbria. Finally, the flower comes from the arms of the council and the Fleurs de Lis is from the arms of the City of Lancaster.

Lancaster University's motto is a component of the coat of arms; taken from a medical pamphlet called Famosa Apologia, which dates from around the early seventeenth century.

Translated from Latin, the phrase "Patet omnibus veritas" means "truth lies open to all". There is also a longer translation:

Those who were before us are not our masters but our leaders. Truth lies open to all. It is not yet anyone's possession. Much of it is left, even for those to come. Nothing, indeed, is more hostile to truth than to take away freedom of speculation.

== See also ==
- Armorial of UK universities
- Red Rose of Lancaster, the county flower of Lancashire
- Duchy of Lancaster
