= Satnam Rana =

Satnam Rana is a presenter for the BBC, currently presenting on BBC news programme Midlands Today and features on BBC Radio WM. She worked at Five Live for two years then came to BBC Birmingham where she has been working since 2002.

== Early life and education ==
Rana was born and brought up in Wolverhampton, West Midlands, England and attended Smestow School. Since Rana was ten years old she wanted to be a journalist, graduating from Lancaster University in 1999.

== Career ==
After graduating, Rana joined BBC Radio 5 Live. Then, in 2002 she joined Midlands Today as a junior reporter.

== BBC Midlands Today ==
Rana is a relief presenter for Midlands Today. She is also a regular presenter on breakfast, late and lunch bulletins. She mainly presents bank holiday and half term editions of Midlands Today and reports on culture and diversity issues in the region. Rana is also a presenter on BBC Radio WM and has also worked for Inside Out.
