= Lancaster University =

Public university in Lancaster, England

- Coat of arms of Lancaster University
- Motto: Latin: Patet omnibus veritas
- Motto in English: Truth lies open to all
- Type: Public
- Established: 1964; 62 years ago
- Academic affiliations: ACU; N8 Group; Universities UK; Defence Universities Alliance
- Endowment: £19.5 million (2025)
- Budget: £428.4 million (2024/25)
- Chancellor: Alan Milburn
- Vice-Chancellor: Steve Decent
- Pro-Chancellor: Alistair Burt
- Academic staff: 2,270 (2024/25)
- Administrative staff: 2,110 (2024/25)
- Students: 18,620 (2024/25); 16,840 FTE (2024/25)
- Undergraduates: 13,935 (2024/25)
- Postgraduates: 4,685 (2024/25)
- Location: Bailrigg, City of Lancaster, England; 54°00′37″N 2°47′08″W
- Campus: Bailrigg
Colours
'Quaker Grey' and red
Colleges
- Bowland
  Cartmel
  County
  Furness
  Fylde
  Graduate
  Grizedale
  Lonsdale
  Pendle
- Website: lancaster.ac.uk

Lancaster University (officially The University of Lancaster) is a collegiate public research university in Lancaster, Lancashire, England. The university was established in 1964 by royal charter, as one of several new universities created in the 1960s.

The university was initially based in St Leonard's Gate in the city centre, before starting a move in 1967 to a purpose-built campus located on 300 acres (120 ha) at Bailrigg, 4 km (2.5 miles) to the south of the city. The campus buildings are arranged around a central walkway known as the Spine, which is connected to a central plaza, named Alexandra Square in honour of its first chancellor, Princess Alexandra.

Lancaster is a residential collegiate university; the colleges are weakly autonomous. The eight undergraduate colleges are named after places in the historic county of Lancashire, and each has its own campus residence blocks, common rooms, administrative staff and bars.

Over the past decade, Lancaster has performed strongly in the major UK University league tables, although its position has varied between ranking systems. In the 2026 editions it was ranked 10th by the Complete University Guide, 14th by The Guardian, and 15th by The Times and The Sunday Times. The annual income of the institution for 2024/25 was £428.4 million of which £49.3 million was from research grants and contracts, with an expenditure of £389.1 million.

Lancaster is a member of the N8 Group of research universities, which also includes the universities of Durham, Leeds, Liverpool, Manchester, Newcastle, Sheffield and York. Since 2015, Alan Milburn has been the university's chancellor.

== History ==
Between 1958 and 1961 seven new plate glass universities were announced, including Lancaster. The choice of Lancaster as the site of the fourth new university was announced on 23 November 1961.

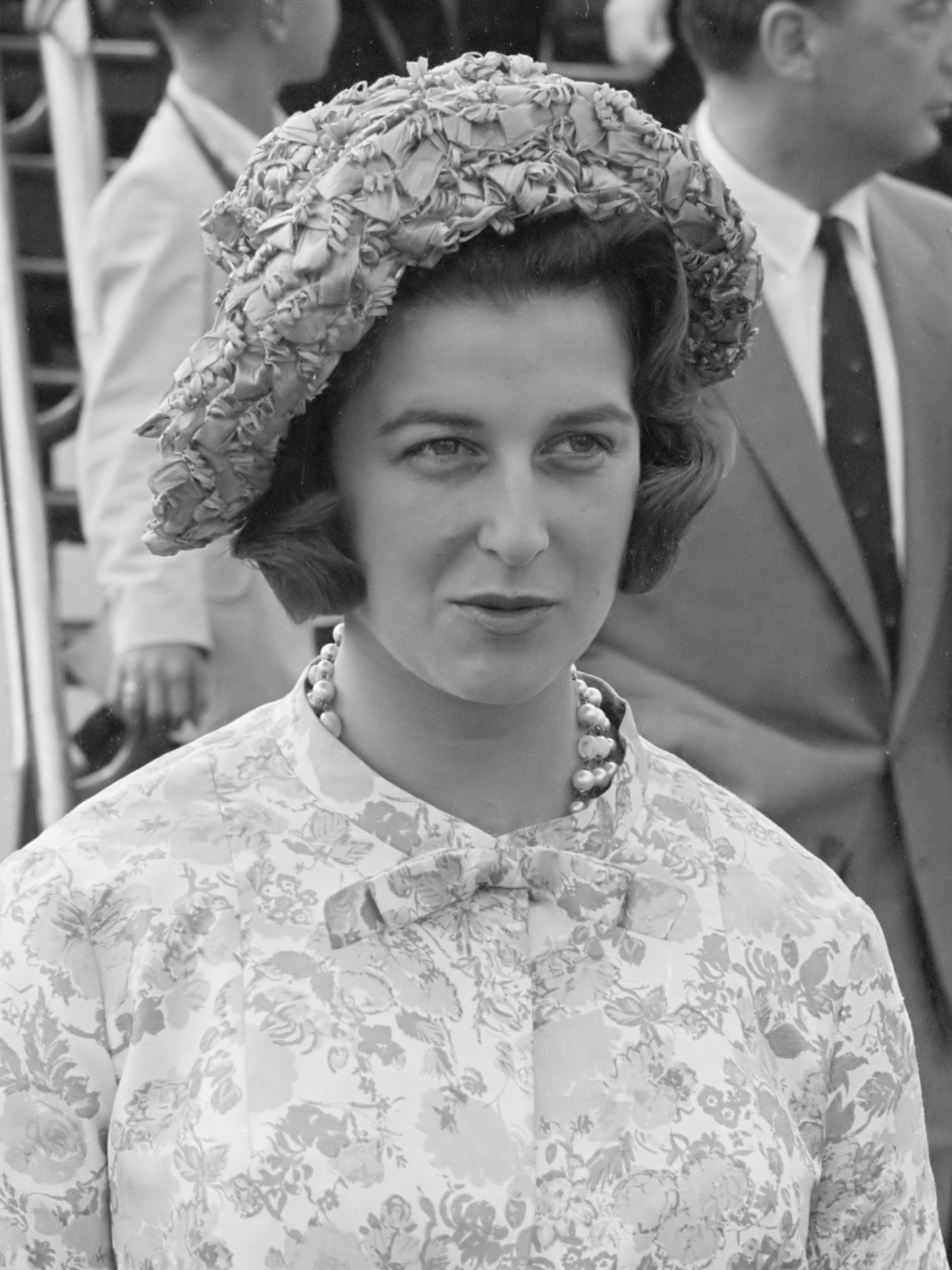
Founding chancellor Princess Alexandra, who served from 1964 to 2004, was one of the longest-serving university chancellors in the UK.

The university was established by royal charter in 1964. The charter stipulated that Princess Alexandra of Kent be the first chancellor. She was inaugurated in 1964. The ceremony also saw the granting of various honorary degrees to dignitaries including the Prime Minister, Harold Wilson.

Princess Alexandra retired as chancellor in 2004 and was at that time the longest serving chancellor of any British university. On her departure, she gave approval for the Chancellor's Medal to be awarded for academic merit to the highest-performing undergraduates and postgraduates. Each year presentations are made to up to five graduates of taught masters' courses and up to six to the highest-performing undergraduates.

The university accepted its first students in October 1964 and there were initially 13 professors, 32 additional members of teaching and research staff, 8 library staff and 14 administrators on academic grades. The motto, "patet omnibus veritas", ("Truth lies open to all"), was adopted. The first science students were admitted in 1965.

The university was temporarily based in the city. A lecture theatre and the university's first Junior Common Room were in Centenary Church, a former Congregational church beside the old factory premises of Waring & Gillow, which were used to accommodate the new students. Many new students were housed in the nearby town of Morecambe. The Grand Theatre was leased as a main lecture room and 112 and 114 in the St Leonard's Gate area became teaching and recreational rooms. The library occupied the old workshops of Shrigley and Hunt on Castle Hill.

Bowland and Lonsdale colleges were founded as the university's first two colleges, and all staff and students were allocated to one of the two, although the first college buildings would not be completed until 1966. The first students moved into residence and set up the first JCRs in October 1968.

The university moved from the city to the new campus at Bailrigg between 1966 and 1970.

In 2014, Lancaster University celebrated its 50th anniversary with a series of events throughout the year, involving alumni, staff, students and local community members.

== Campus ==
Locations of various Lancaster University and LUSU owned and affiliated buildings and facilities in Lancaster

=== Bailrigg ===
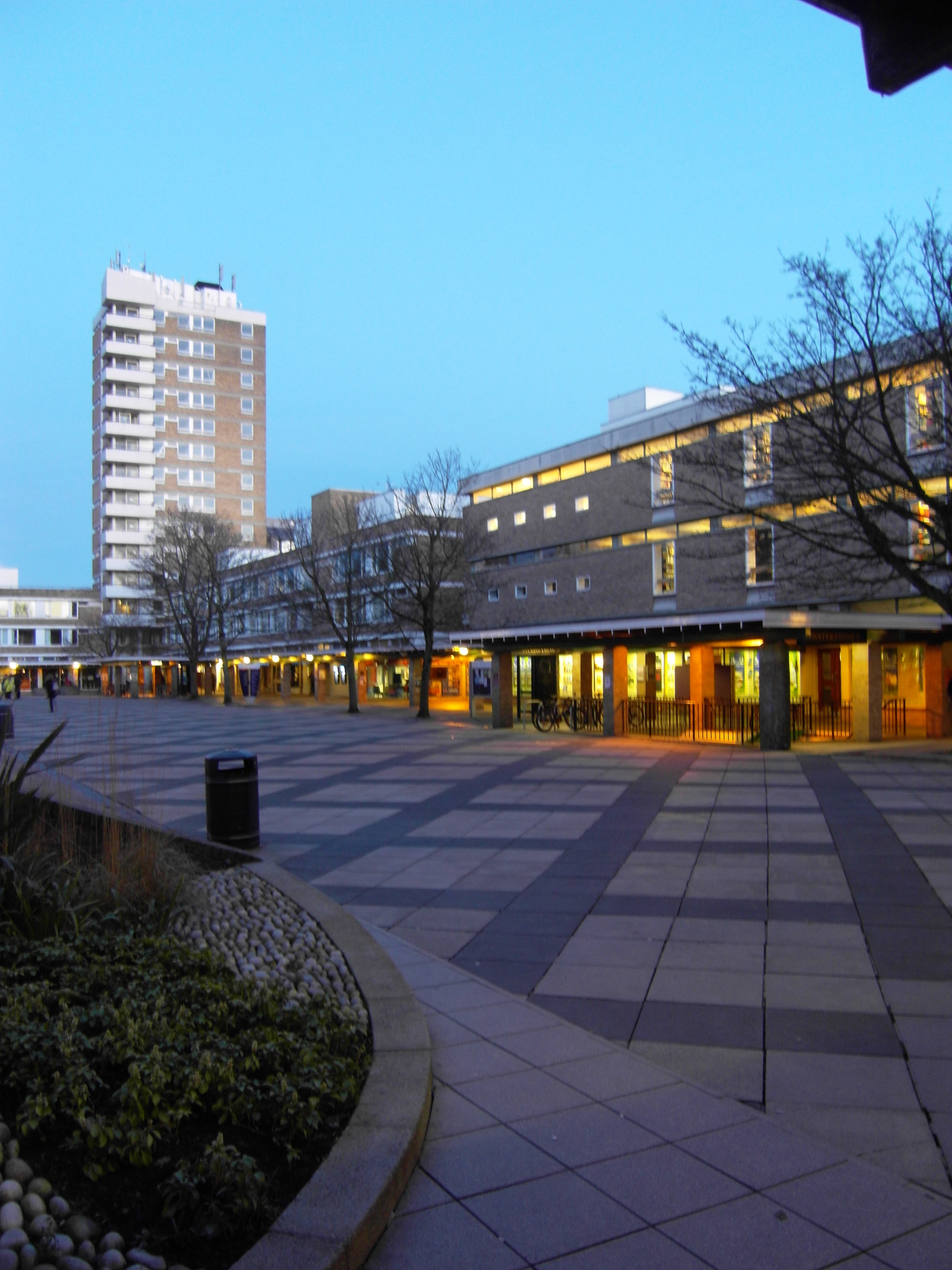
Alexandra Square with Bowland Tower (pictured in 2009)

The purpose-built campus occupies Bailrigg, a 360-acre (0.563 sq mi; 1.457 km^{2}) site donated by Lancaster City Council in 1963. The campus buildings are located on a hilltop, the lower slopes of which are landscaped parkland which includes Lake Carter duck pond and the university sports fields. The lake was created in the early 1900s and was later named Lake Carter after Charles Carter, the first Vice Chancellor of the university. The site is three miles (5 km) south of the city centre. Construction of the Bailrigg campus began in November 1965, with the first building completed a year later. The first on-campus student residences opened in 1968.

Unlike some other campus universities, Bailrigg was designed to integrate social, residential and teaching areas. Another major feature of the design is that there is no large central Students' Union building, instead individual college facilities are used as the centre for social and recreational activities .

Vehicular and pedestrian traffic is separated: this is achieved by restricting motor vehicles to a peripheral road with a linking underpass running east–west beneath Alexandra Square. The underpass accommodates the Bailrigg bus station and was refurbished in autumn 2010. Car parking is arranged in cul-de-sacs running off the peripheral road.

The campus buildings are arranged around a central walkway known as "The Spine". The walkway runs from north (County College) to south-west (Graduate College) and is covered for most of its length. The main architect was Gabriel Epstein of Shepheard and Epstein. Architect Peter Shepheard recalls:

"We went up there on a windy day, and it was freezing cold. Every time we opened a plan it blew away. And we said Christ! What are we going to do with these students, where are they going to sit in the sun and all that? Well, we decided, it's got to be cloisters. All of the buildings have got to touch at the ground. We then devised this system and it had an absolutely firm principle: it had a great spine down the middle where everybody walked. That led everywhere. The cars were on the outside, on both sides. When you came into the spaces things were square, they were rectangular courtyards and they were all slightly different. There were two or three essentials: one was that the covered way had to be continuous, the buildings had to be three or four storeys high and connecting to the next one. I thought it worked very well."

Between 2016 and 2018 the Spine was extensively remodelled in a project known as "Design The Spine", with the aim of replacing the decaying wooden canopy, widening bottlenecks, and creating new landscaped green spaces.

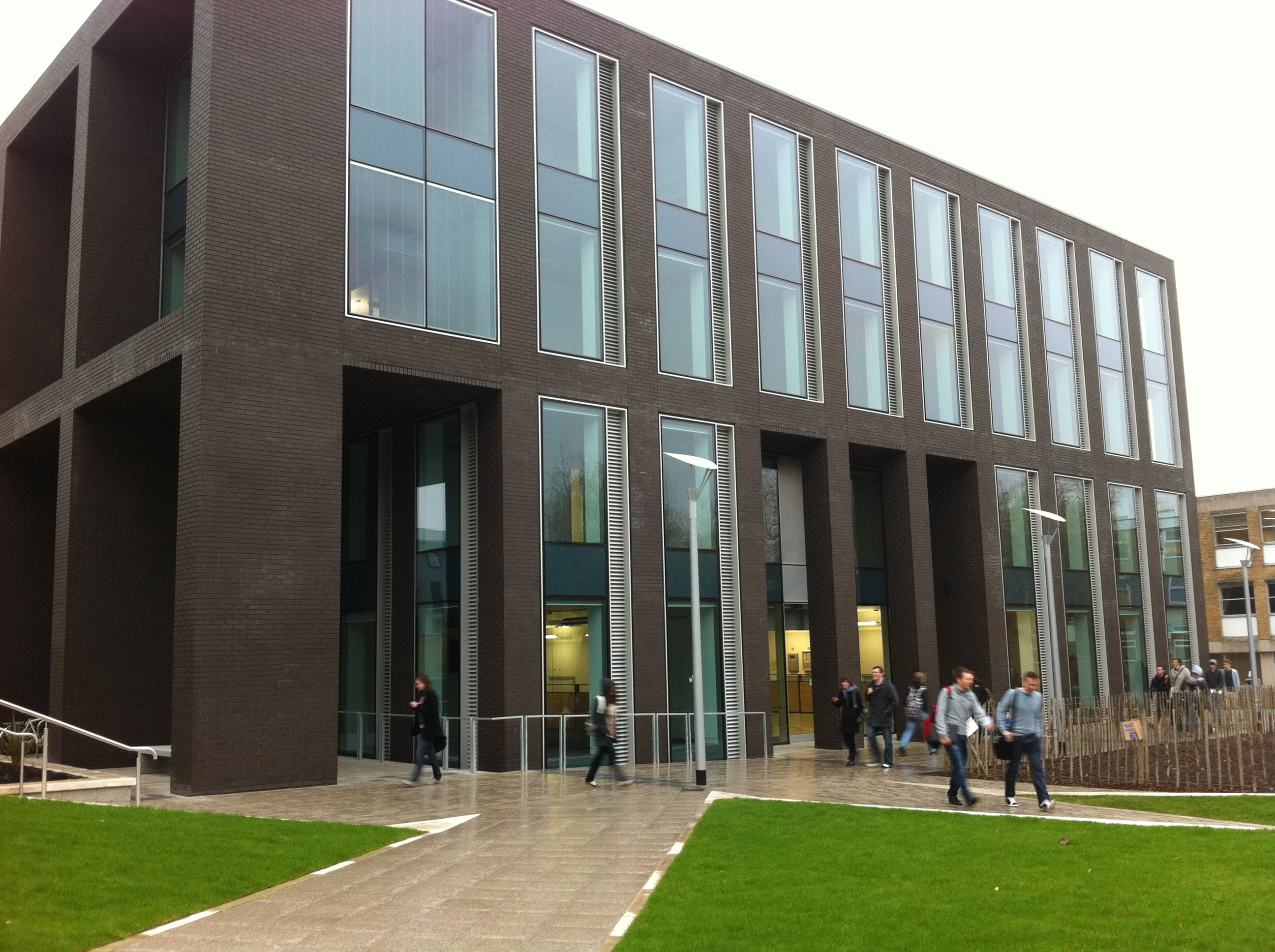
Charles Carter building

Alexandra Square is the university's main plaza. Named after the first chancellor, Princess Alexandra and is situated at the centre of the original campus. On the west side of the square is University House as well as various banks and shops. To the south-east of the square is the tallest building on campus: the fourteen-storey Bowland Tower, which contains accommodation and disguises the boiler room chimney.

One of the most distinctive of the Bailrigg buildings is the free-standing University Chaplaincy Centre. Opened on 2 May 1969, the architects were the Preston-based firm Cassidy & Ashton. The building has a trefoil plan with a central spire where the three circles meet. The university's former logo is based on the spire.

A plan existed to have a twin campus with another eight colleges to the east of the M6 motorway at Hazelrigg. This would have been linked to Bailrigg by a flyover. The plan was abandoned in the 1970s during a period of financial difficulties.

=== Library ===
In the south-west corner sits the library designed in 1964 by Tom Mellor and Partners, the first phase opening in September 1966, the second in July 1968 and the third in January 1971. The library was extended in 1997 and underwent a phased refurbishment in 2014, which was completed in 2016. In 2021 the Library Extension Project was completed, which introduced additional student study space and 'living walls', exhibition and research space, a 'safepod' and digital studio.

A distinctive feature of the library is the large tree that grows in the centre of the ground floor study area.

Next to the library, and opened in 1998 is The Ruskin - Library, Museum and Research Centre, designed by Sir Richard MacCormac.

=== South-West Campus ===
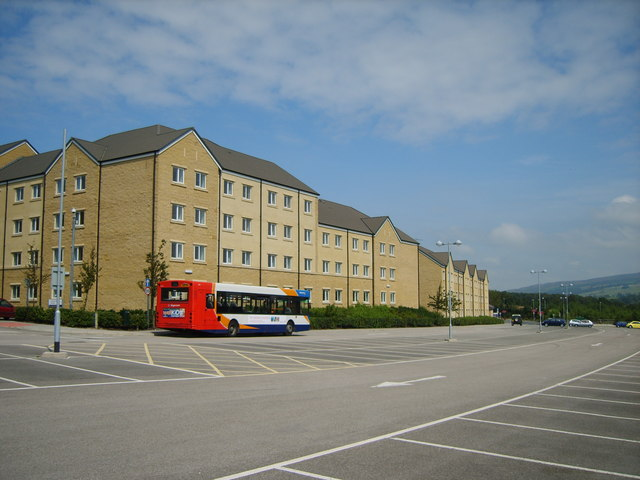
Student accommodation in South-West Campus

The university began expansion onto the lower slopes of Bailrigg with the development of new buildings for Graduate College in 1998, which is now part of South-West Campus. Development continued with the construction of InfoLab21 and Alexandra Park which now houses Lonsdale College, Cartmel College and the en-suite rooms of Pendle College. The development of InfoLab21 met objections, with the proposed building being described as a 'Dalek factory'.

Cartmel College is built around Barker House Farm, a listed 17th-century farmhouse and outbuildings that form the centre of the college.

=== Health Innovation Centre ===
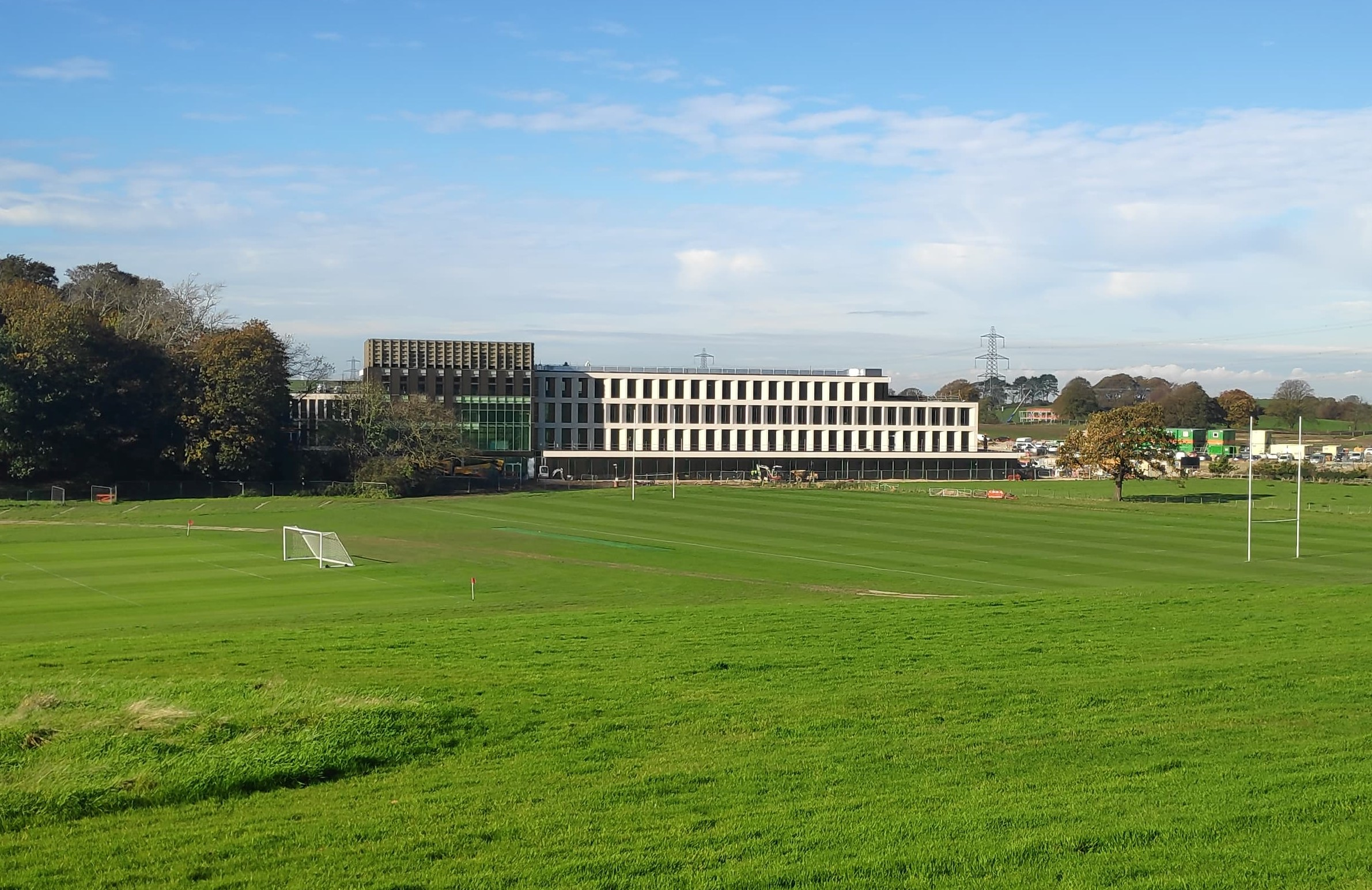
Health Innovation Campus at Lancaster University under construction in October 2019

The university built a 'Health Innovation Campus' adjacent to the existing campus in 2020. The campus was billed to create 2,000 jobs and boost the local economy by around £100 million. The £29.7 million contract for construction of the first building was awarded to BAM Construction in October 2017; construction began in December 2017 and was completed in summer 2020. The building is 80,000 square feet and required the construction of an access road with a junction to the A6.

=== Services ===
The Bailrigg campus hosts a range of shops and services. Services on campus include Bailrigg post office, a health centre, a pharmacy, hairdressers, Lancaster University Homes office as well as many others.

=== Cultural venues ===
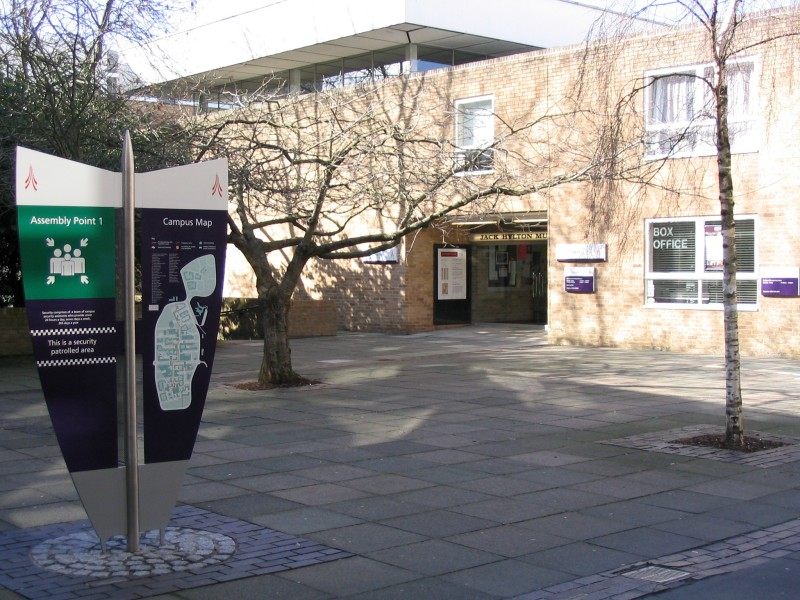
Outside the Jack Hylton music rooms

At the north end of campus, the university's Great Hall Complex comprises three venues open to both students and the public; the Peter Scott Gallery, the Nuffield Theatre and the Lancaster International Concert Series. In 2009, these three organisations were combined as one department by the university – initially termed 'The Public Arts' but later renamed 'Live at LICA' – with Matt Fenton overseeing this unification. In August 2015 Live at LICA was rebranded to 'Lancaster Arts at Lancaster University' to avoid confusion with the department of LICA, then director Jamie Eastman stated that; "This new name and logo communicates who we are, where we are and what we're offering."

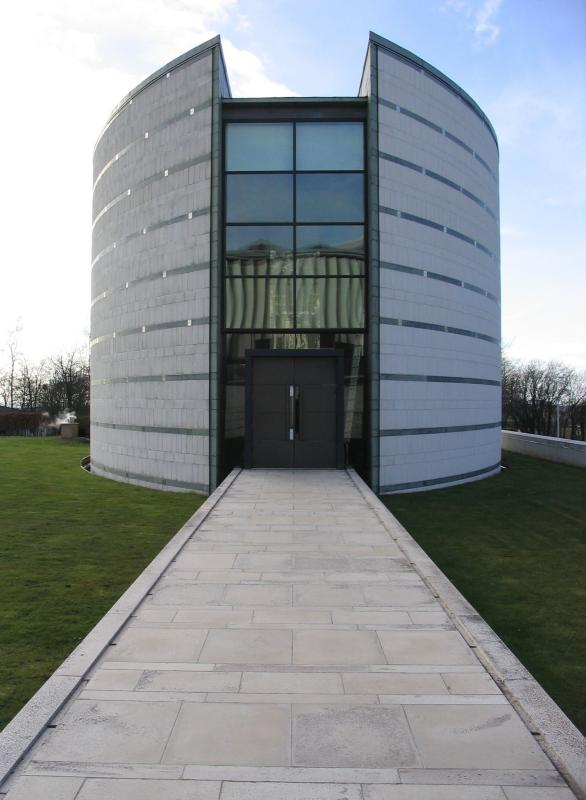
The Ruskin - Library, Museum and Research Centre

The Peter Scott Gallery is open to the public free of charge. The Gallery is located on the Bailrigg campus and houses the university's international art collection, which includes Japanese and Chinese art, antiquities, works by twentieth-century British artists including works by artists from the St Ives School, Sir Terry Frost, Wilhelmina Barns-Graham, Barbara Hepworth and William Scott. Among other British artists whose work is represented are Norman Adams, Patrick Caulfield, Elisabeth Frink, Kenneth Martin and Winifred Nicholson. Within the last fifteen years works by Andy Goldsworthy, Peter Howson and Albert Irvin have been acquired. The university collection also includes prints by significant European artists such as Dürer, Miró, Ernst and Vasarely.

Lancaster International Concert Series is the main provider of classical music in north Lancashire and Cumbria. Concerts are held within the Great Hall. Between October and March each year the series offers a varied diet of music which includes: orchestral concerts, chamber music, events for young people, jazz, family concerts and world music.

The Nuffield Theatre, a black box theatre, is one of the largest and most adaptable professional studio theatres in Europe. It presents public performances in the fields of theatre, contemporary dance and live art from some of the best-known and respected companies from the UK and abroad. The focus of the work is new and experimental practice, a focus it shares with many of the teaching and research interest of Lancaster Institute for the Contemporary Arts (LICA). The Nuffield presents up to 30 visiting professional shows a year, plus public performances by students from Theatre Studies, and the university's student theatre and dance societies and a range of local community organisations.

The Ruskin - Library, Museum and Research Centre houses archive material related to the poet, author and artist John Ruskin. It is open to the public, although only a small part of the collection is on public display at once. The building was constructed in 1997 by architect Sir Richard MacCormac (1938–2014). The Ruskin Whitehouse Collection housed in The Ruskin is the largest holding of books, manuscripts, photographs, drawings and watercolours by and related to John Ruskin in the world.

=== Conference centre ===
In 2016 the university purchased the 165-acre Forrest Hills conference centre and golf course, located on the M6 opposite the main campus, which it continues to operate as a conference venue.

== Organisation and administration ==
=== Colleges ===
Colleges of Lancaster University
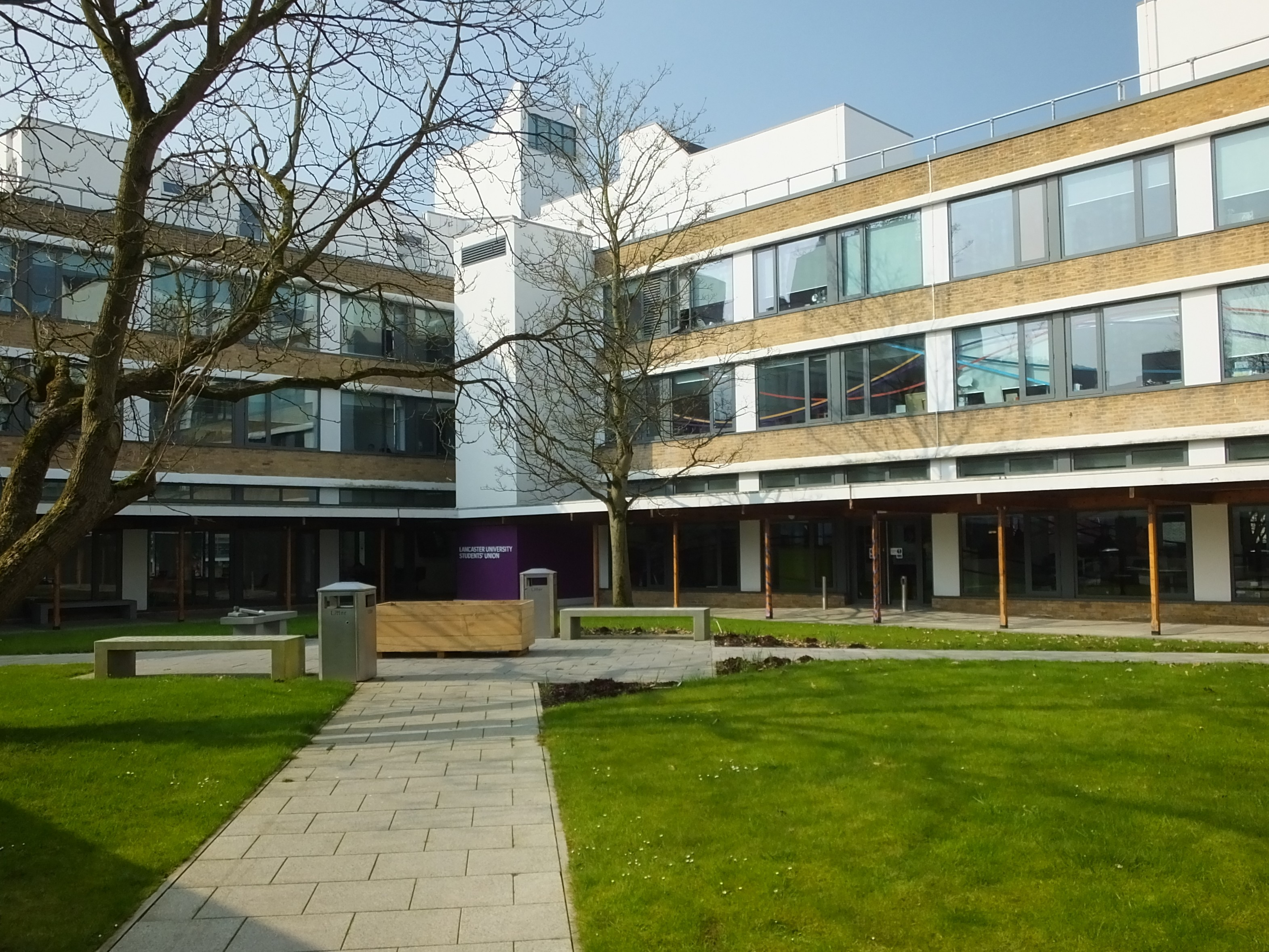
Bowland College (1964)

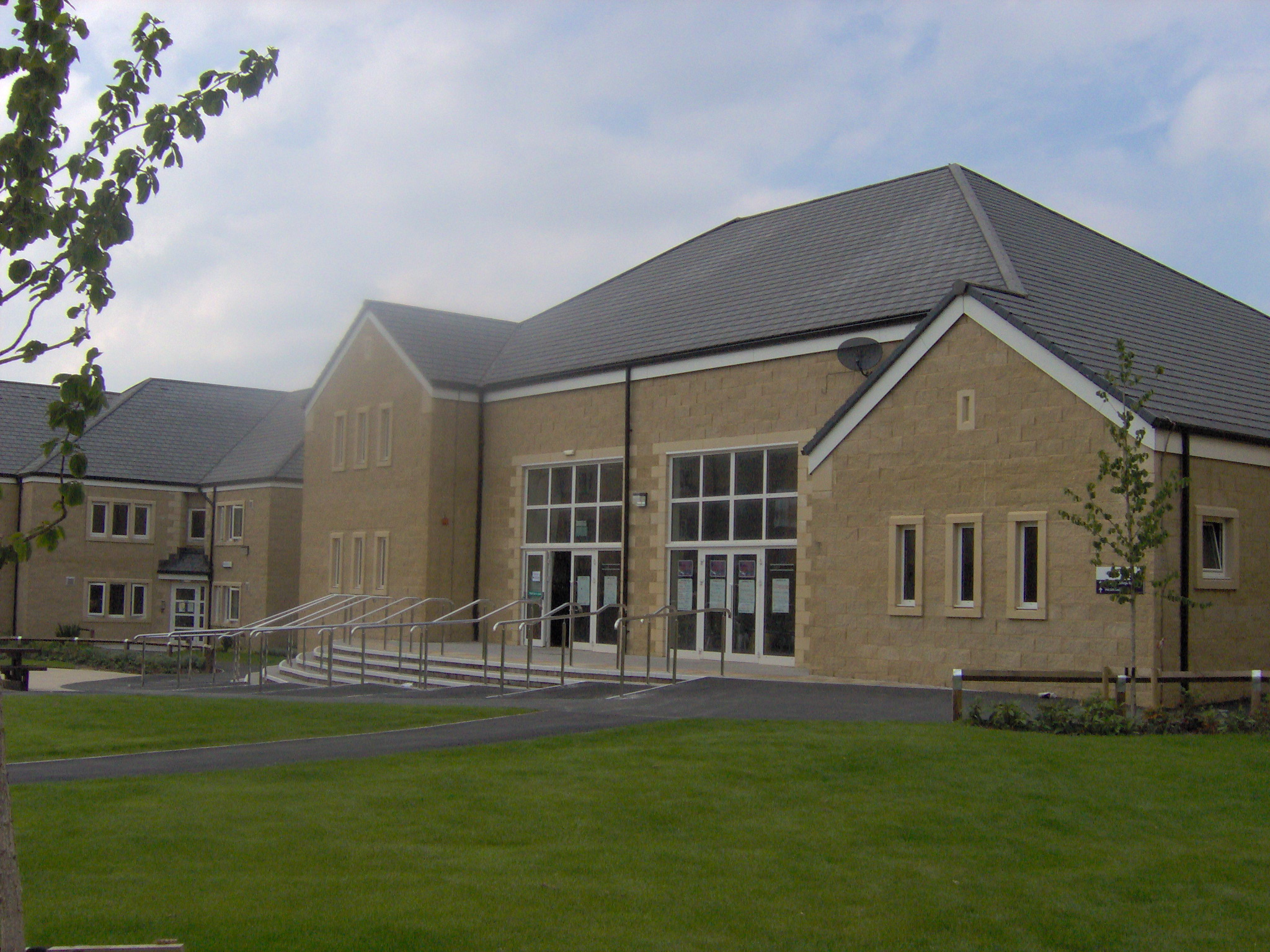
Lonsdale College (1964, relocated 2004)

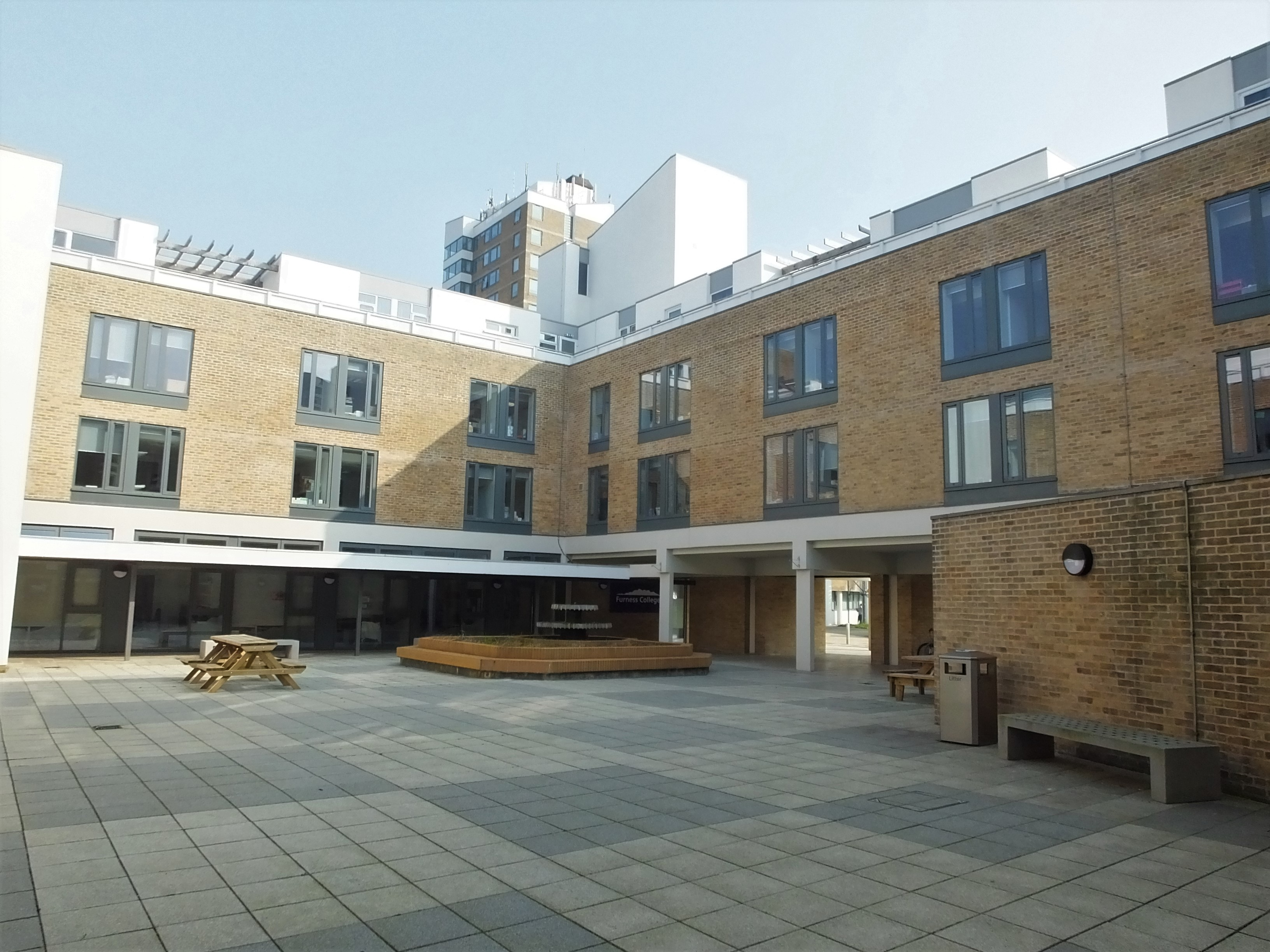
Furness College (1966)

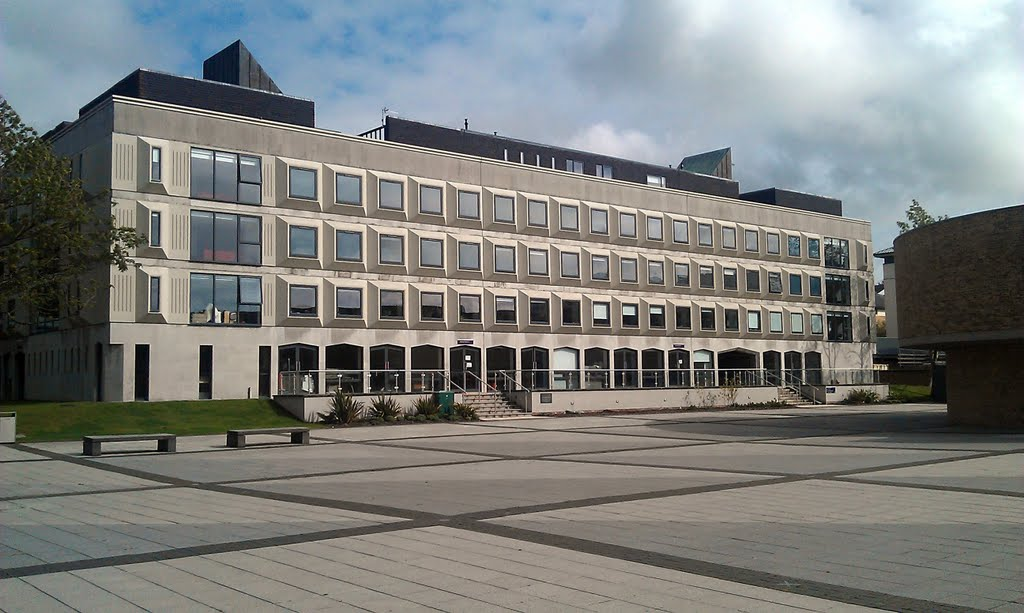
The County College (1967)

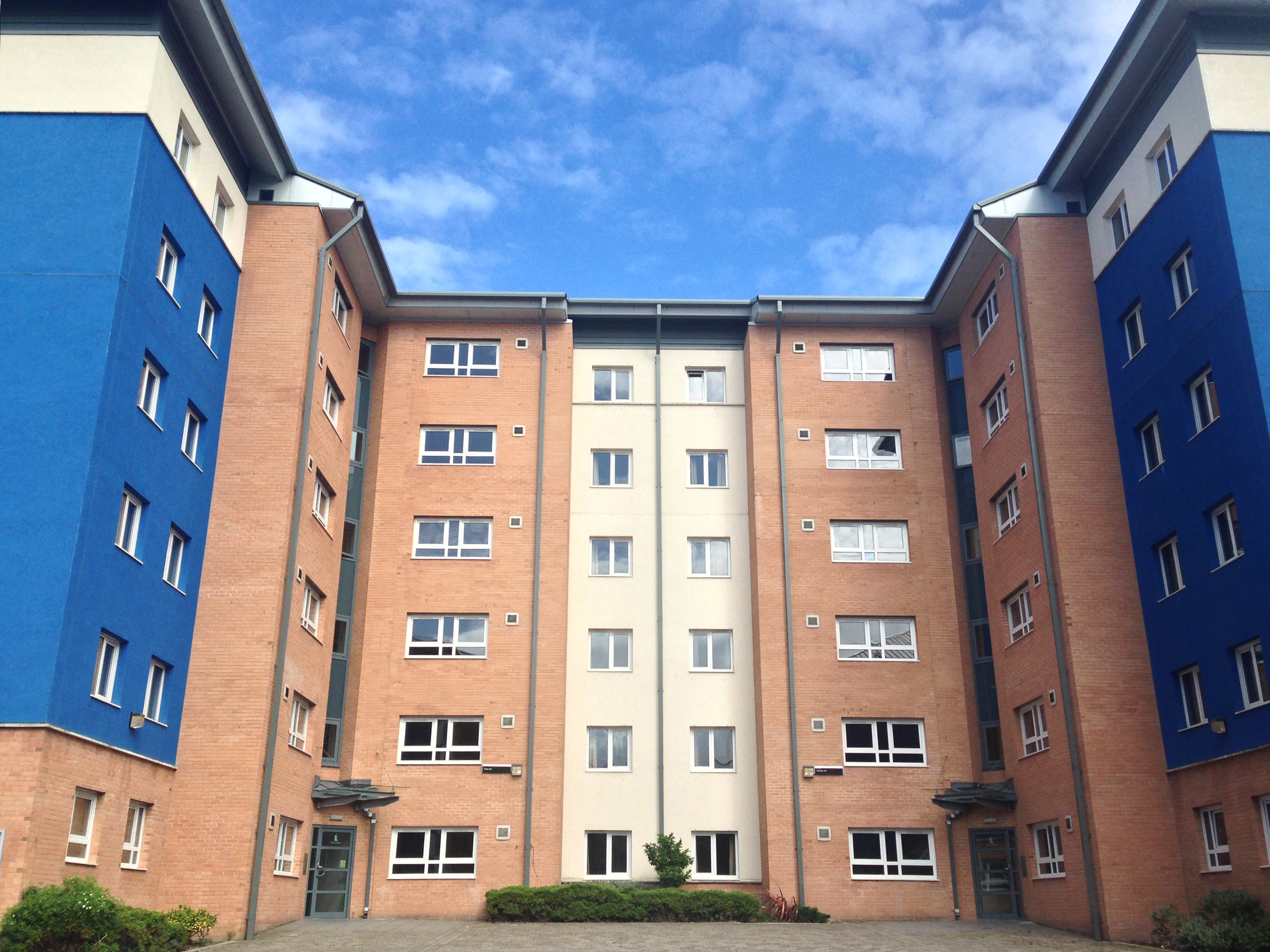
Fylde College (1968)

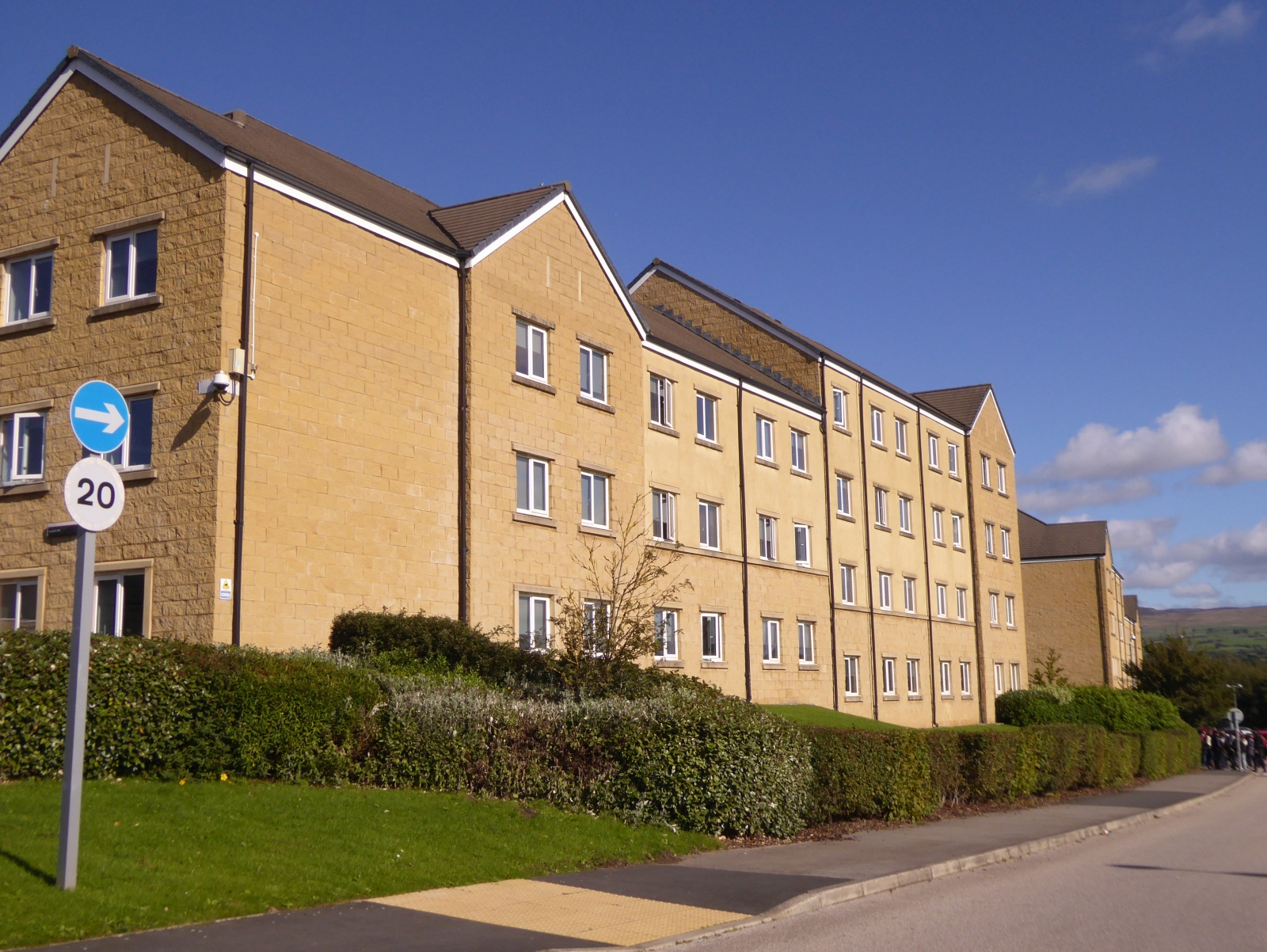
Cartmel College (1968, relocated 2004)

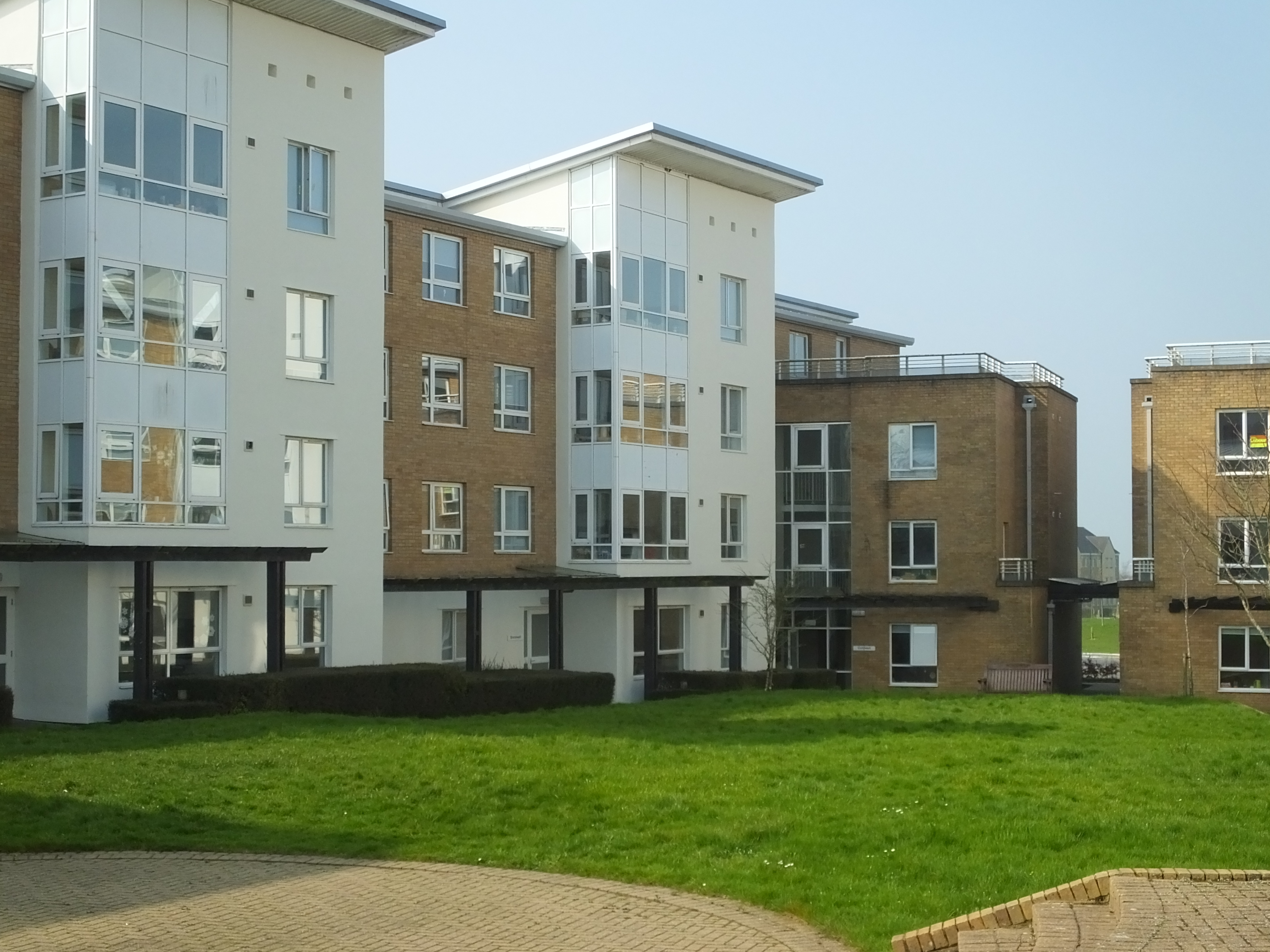
Pendle College (1974)

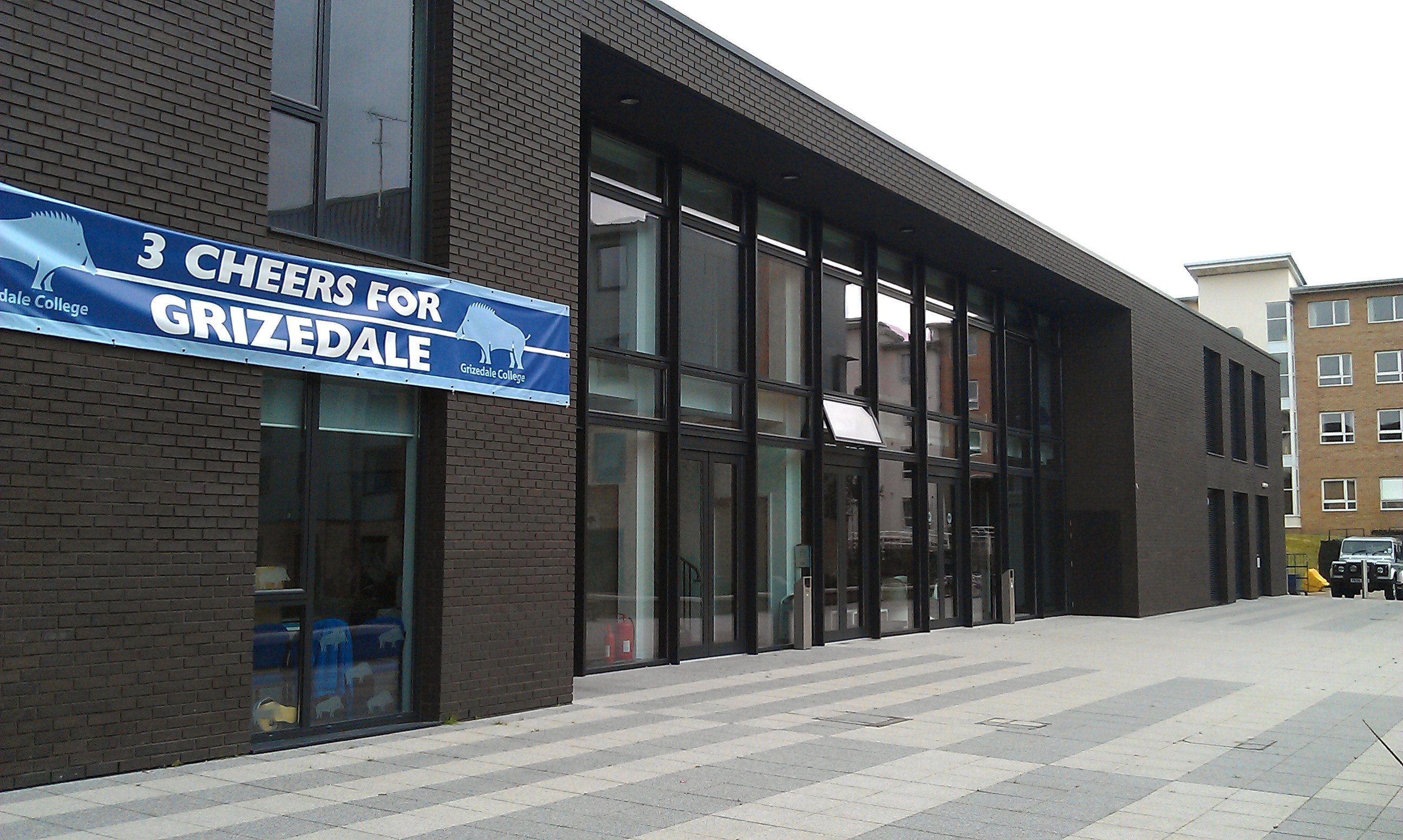
Grizedale College (1975)

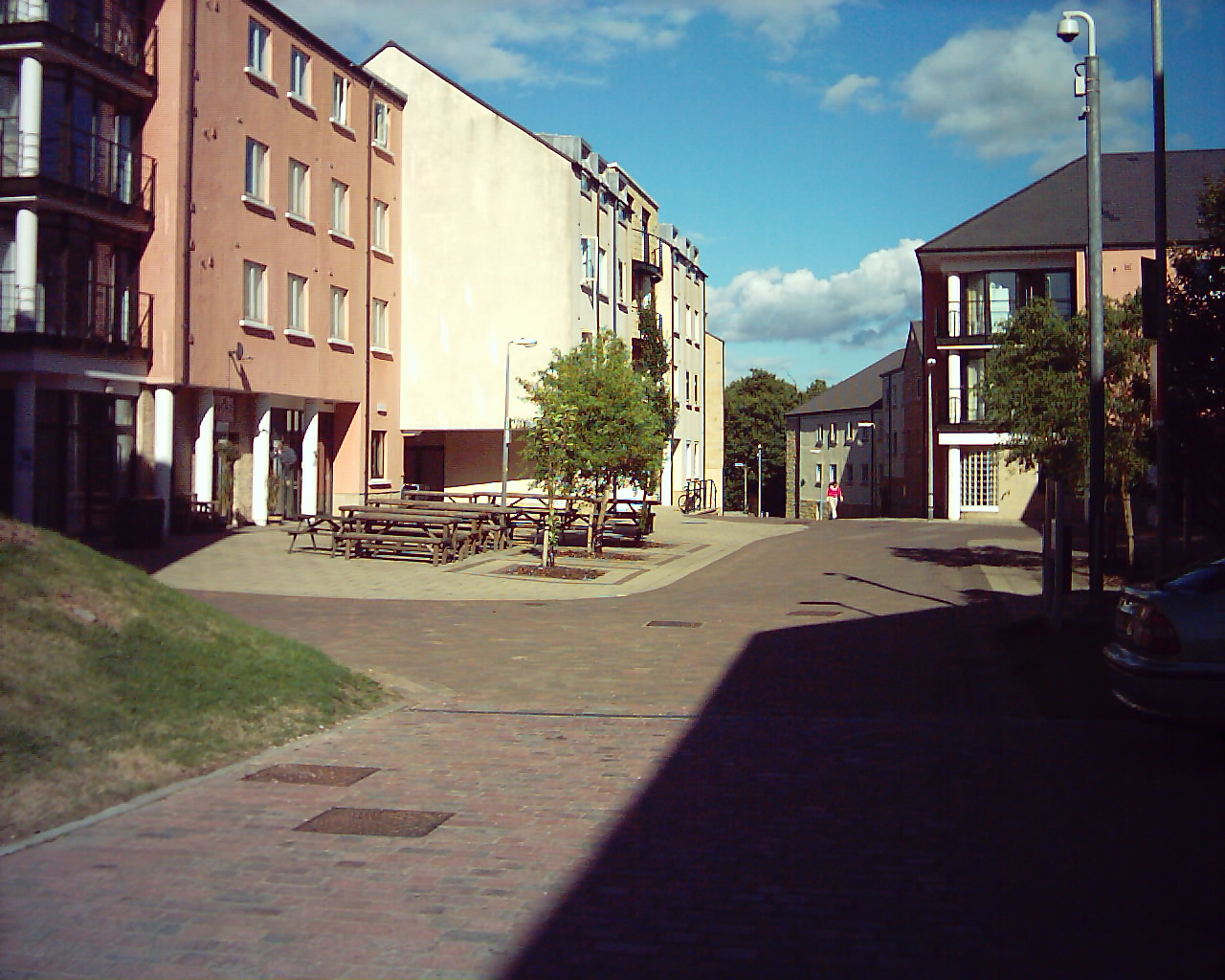
Graduate College (1992)

The university has nine colleges. Formerly, these were quasi-autonomous bodies providing for accommodation, welfare, social-life and student discipline, but are currently centrally controlled. All members of the university are members of a college, although in recent years academic staff have had decreasing involvement. Most colleges have about eight or nine hundred members and all on-campus accommodation is linked to a college, with blocks or individual flats being linked to one college or another each year according to demand. The colleges were governed by a syndicate, including a principal (originally a senior academic but nowadays more usually a middle-ranking administrator or IT professional), a Dean and assistant deans (responsible for student discipline), together with a senior advisor, heading a team of College Advisors. These were previously known as Senior Tutor and College Tutors, but the titles were changed in 2011 to Advisor to avoid possible confusion with "Academic Advisors" in students' academic departments. Collectively, the colleges are run by their individual SCR (Senior Common Room) and JCR (Junior Common Room), the latter being made up of student members of the college.

Prior to the founding of the ninth college, Graduate College, in 1992, the eight colleges housed both undergraduate and postgraduate students. Today all postgraduate students are members of the Graduate College, which was founded to specifically address the needs of postgraduates and provide year-round provision for courses with different term dates. Students on integrated master's degrees however are still considered undergraduates and therefore remain in their original colleges.

Seven of the eight undergraduate colleges are named after regions of the traditional county of Lancashire, whilst County College is named after Lancashire County Council which financed its construction.

Name	Foundation	Colours	Students (2024/25)	Named after
Bowland College	1964		1,677	Forest of Bowland
Cartmel College	1968		1,880	Cartmel Peninsula
The County College	1967		1,900	Lancashire
Furness College	1966		1,500	Furness region
Fylde College	1968		1,590	The Fylde peninsula
Graduate College	1992		5,212	Status as a postgraduate college
Grizedale College	1975		1,478	Grizedale Forest
Lonsdale College	1964		1,990	Lonsdale Hundred (River Lune and its valley)
Pendle College	1974		1,660	Pendle region

The college buildings accommodate a number of academic departments, but are primarily social and accommodation facilities, each with its own bar, which forms part of the university's Commercial Services and is open when profitable.

=== Academic departments ===
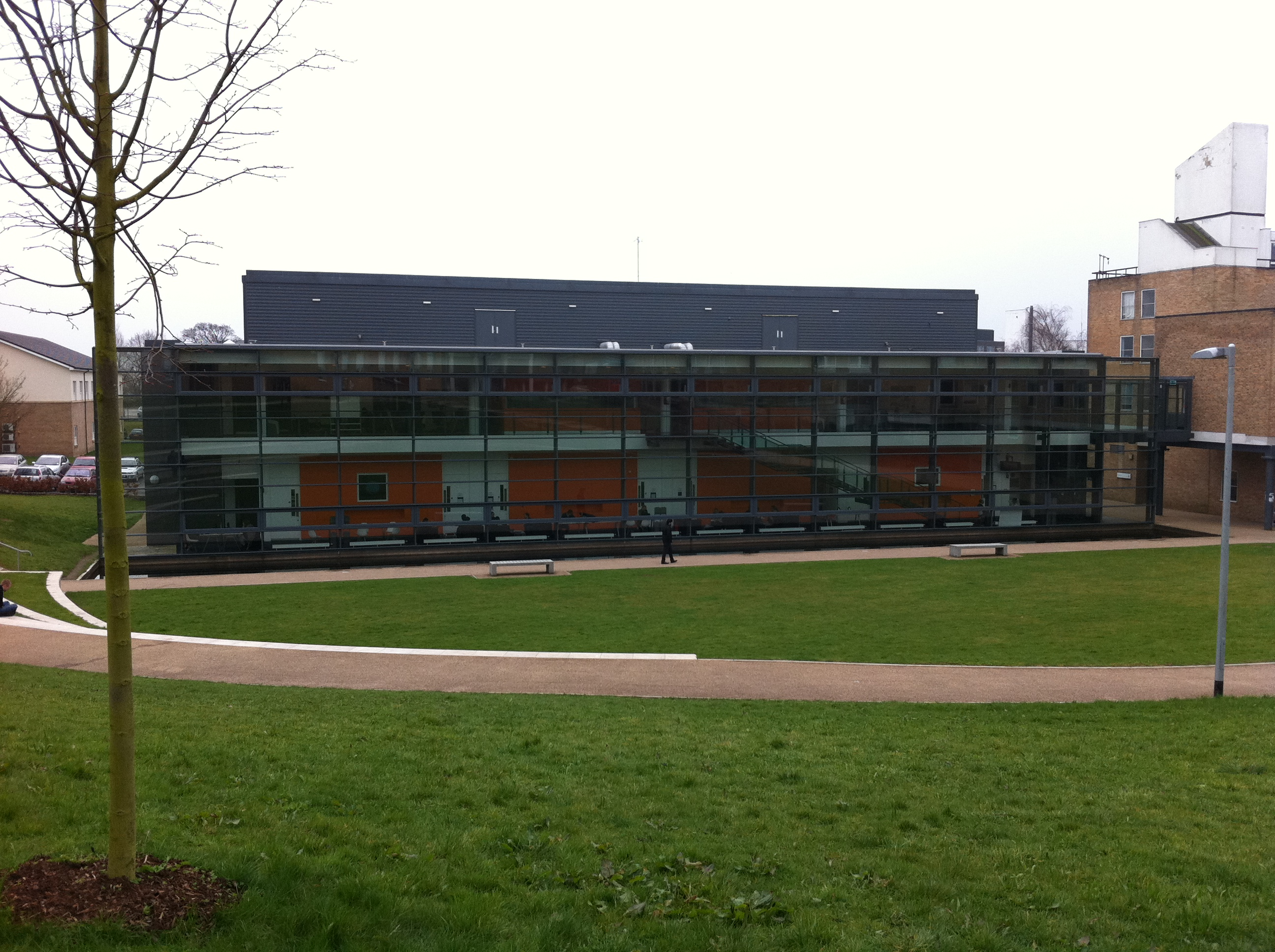
Postgraduate Statistics Centre

The university is currently organised into four faculties, divided into Departments (sometimes named Schools). Each faculty is led by an Executive Dean, and each academic department by a Head of Department or School.

Three of the four faculties were formed in 2005 from a reorganisation of the previous five-faculty structure (Arts and Humanities, Social Sciences, Management, Environmental and Natural Science, and Applied Sciences). Health and Medicine was added in 2008. Arts and Social Sciences underwent a significant reorganisation in 2025; nine "departments" became four "schools", and the faculty was renamed to Humanities, Arts and Social Sciences.

- Faculty of Humanities, Arts and Social Sciences
  - School of Arts
    Architecture, Arts Management, Creative Writing, Design, English Literature, Film, Fine Art, Media, Theatre
  - School of Global Affairs
    Global Languages and Cultures, History, International Relations, Philosophy, Politics, Religion
  - School of Law
  - School of Social Sciences
    Criminology, Educational Research, Linguistics and English Language, Social Work, Sociology
- Faculty of Health and Medicine
  - Division of Biomedical and Life Sciences
  - Division of Health Research
  - Lancaster Medical School
- Faculty of Science and Technology
  - Department of Chemistry
  - School of Computing and Communications (SCC)
  - Department of Engineering
  - Lancaster Environment Centre
    Biological Sciences, Environmental Science, Geography
  - Department of Mathematics and Statistics
  - Natural Sciences
  - Department of Physics
  - Department of Psychology
- Lancaster University Management School
  - Accounting and Finance
  - Centre for Education, Training and Development (CETAD)
  - Department of Economics
  - Department of Entrepreneurship, Strategy and Innovation
  - Department of Leadership and Management
  - Department of Management Science
  - Department of Marketing
  - Department of Organisation, Work and Technology

The various administrative and technical departments that exist outside of the four faculties are collectively known as Professional Services, and include Facilities, Admissions, and the Library.

=== Governance ===
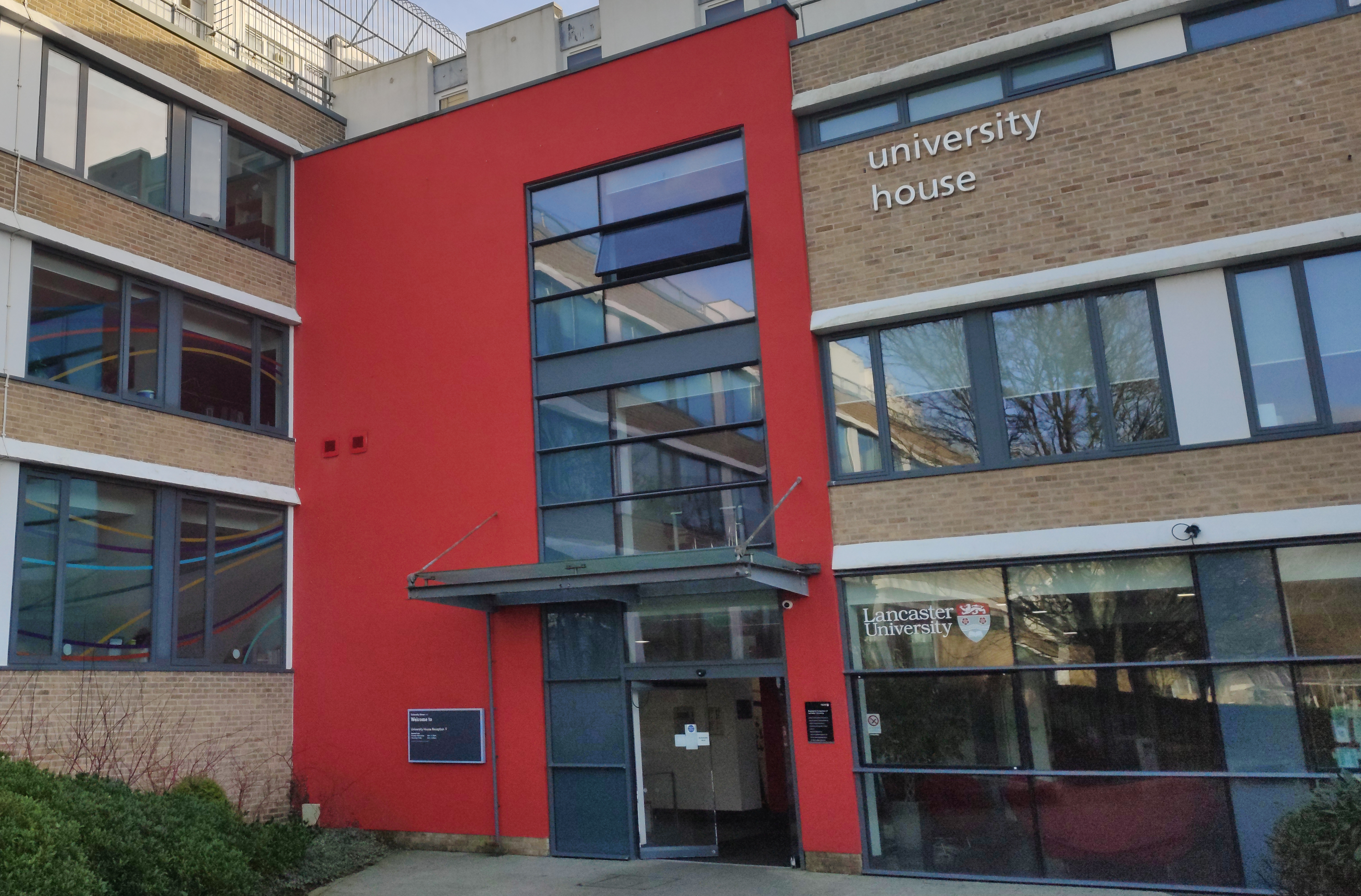
University House is home to most of the university's administrative departments

The university is governed by two main statutory bodies: the Council and the Senate.

The council, chaired by the Pro-Chancellor, is the governing body, consisting of mainly lay members along with representatives of staff and students. It is responsible for the proper management and financial solvency of the university, with major policy decisions and corporate strategy being subject to its approval. The majority of Council members are "lay members"; neither staff nor students of the university.

The Senate of the university, chaired by the Vice-Chancellor, is the principal academic authority. It oversees academic management and sets strategy and priorities, including the curriculum and maintenance of standards. Membership of the Senate consists mainly of the Faculty deans, heads of academic departments, and college principals.

Formerly, a body called the University Court provided a public forum where persons from within and outside Lancaster University could raise any matters regarding the university. A majority of the members of the Court represented the local community and other designated bodies with an interest in the work of the university. The final meeting of the Court took place in January 2018, with the university currently planning to replace it with an "Annual Public Meeting".

==== Visitor ====
As defined in the university charter, the Visitor of the university is the monarch of the United Kingdom, who, upon establishment, was Queen Elizabeth II. The current visitor of the university is her successor, King Charles III. The visitor is the final arbiter of any dispute within the university, except in those areas where legislation has removed this to the law courts or other ombudsmen. Student complaints and appeals were heard by the visitor until the Higher Education Act 2004 came into force. All student complaints are now heard by the Office of the Independent Adjudicator for Higher Education.

==== Chancellor ====
The Chancellor, currently Alan Milburn, is the formal and ceremonial head of the university.

Former Chancellor Sir Chris Bonington serves as the Chancellor's Ambassador, whilst Alistair Burt is the current Pro-Chancellor and chair of the University Council, succeeding Roger Liddle in October 2020.

Chancellors of Lancaster University
Name	Duration
Princess Alexandra, The Hon Lady Ogilvy	1964–2004
Sir Christian Bonington	2005–2014
Alan Milburn	2015–present

==== Vice-Chancellor ====
The Vice-Chancellor is the chief academic and executive officer of the university. The Vice-Chancellor is supported by the Deputy Vice-Chancellor, three Pro Vice-Chancellors, and the Provost for Student Experience, Colleges and the Library. Andrew John Schofield was appointed Vice-Chancellor in November 2019, after the resignation of Mark Smith in September 2019. Andy Schofield took up the post of Vice-Chancellor on 1 May 2020, with Steve Bradley holding the position of Interim Vice-Chancellor during the interim period.

Schofield announced his resignation effective August 2025, and was replaced by Steve Decent in January 2026. Deputy Vice-Chancellor Rebecca Lingwood held the position of Interim Vice-Chancellor during the interim period.

Vice-Chancellors of Lancaster University
Name	Duration
Sir Charles Carter	1964–1980
Philip Reynolds	1980–1985
Harry Hanham	1985–1995
William Ritchie	1995–2002
Paul Wellings	2002–2011
Mark Smith	2011–2019
Andy Schofield	2020–2025
Steve Decent	2026–

=== Finances ===
In the financial year ending 31 July 2024, Lancaster had a total income of £401.7 million (2022/23 – £381 million) and total expenditure of £290.7 million (2022/23 – £345 million). Key sources of income included £206.8 million from tuition fees and education contracts (2022/23 – £199.3 million), £52.7 million from funding body grants (2022/23 – £50.5 million), £48.5 million from research grants and contracts (2022/23 – £46.4 million), £7.7 million from investment income (2022/23 – £4.5 million) and £0.8 million from donations and endowments (2022/23 – £4 million).

At year end, Lancaster had endowments of £18.9 million (2022/23 – £18.4 million) and total net assets of £493.6 million (2022/23 – £386.6 million).

== Academic profile ==
=== Admissions ===
UCAS Admission Statistics
	2025	2024	2023	2022	2021
Applications (Note: Main scheme applications, International and UK)	23,695	23,350	21,325	21,120	22,210
Accepted	4,605	4,375	3,995	4,400	4,115
Applications/Accepted Ratio	5.1	5.3	5.3	4.8	5.4
Overall Offer Rate (%)	87.2	85.3	83.6	84.9	87.5
↳ UK only (%) (Note: UK domiciled applicants)	88.0	86.9	84.8	85.2	88.3
Average Entry Tariff	—N/a	—N/a	139	150	153
↳ Top three exams (Note: The maximum tariff score for three exams is 168: the equivalent of A*A*A* at A-Level, 777 at HL for the IB Diploma Programme, or AAA at Advanced Higher)	—N/a	—N/a	138.1	142.7	146.3

HESA Student Body Composition (2024/25)
Domicile and Ethnicity	Total
British White (Note: Not be confused solely with White British)	57%
British Ethnic Minorities (Note: Includes those who indicate that they identify as Asian, Black, Mixed Heritage, Arab or any other ethnicity except White.)	21%
International EU	3%
International Non-EU	20%
Undergraduate Widening Participation Indicators
Female	52%
Independent School	11%
Low Participation Areas (Note: Calculated from the Polar4 measure, using Quintile1, in England and Wales. Calculated from the Scottish Index of Multiple Deprivation (SIMD) measure, using SIMD20, in Scotland.)	10%

In 2024/25, Lancaster's student body consisted of 18,620 students, composed of 13,935 undergraduates and 4,685 postgraduate students. The university is consistently designated as a 'high-tariff' institution by the Department for Education, with the average undergraduate entrant to the university in recent years amassing between 138–146 UCAS Tariff points in their top three pre-university qualifications – the equivalent of AAB to AAA at A-Level. Based on 2022/23 HESA entry standards data published in domestic league tables, which include a broad range of qualifications beyond the top three exam grades, the average student at Lancaster University achieved 150 points.

According to the 2017 Times and Sunday Times Good University Guide, approximately 10% of Lancaster's undergraduates come from independent schools. In the 2016–17 academic year, the university had a domicile breakdown of 66:10:23 of UK:EU:non-EU students respectively with a female to male ratio of 51:49.

=== Reputation and rankings ===
Rankings
National rankings
- Complete (2027): 10
- Guardian (2027): 27
- Times / Sunday Times (2027): 26

Global rankings
- ARWU (2026): 301–400
- QS (2027): 164
- THE (2026): 184=

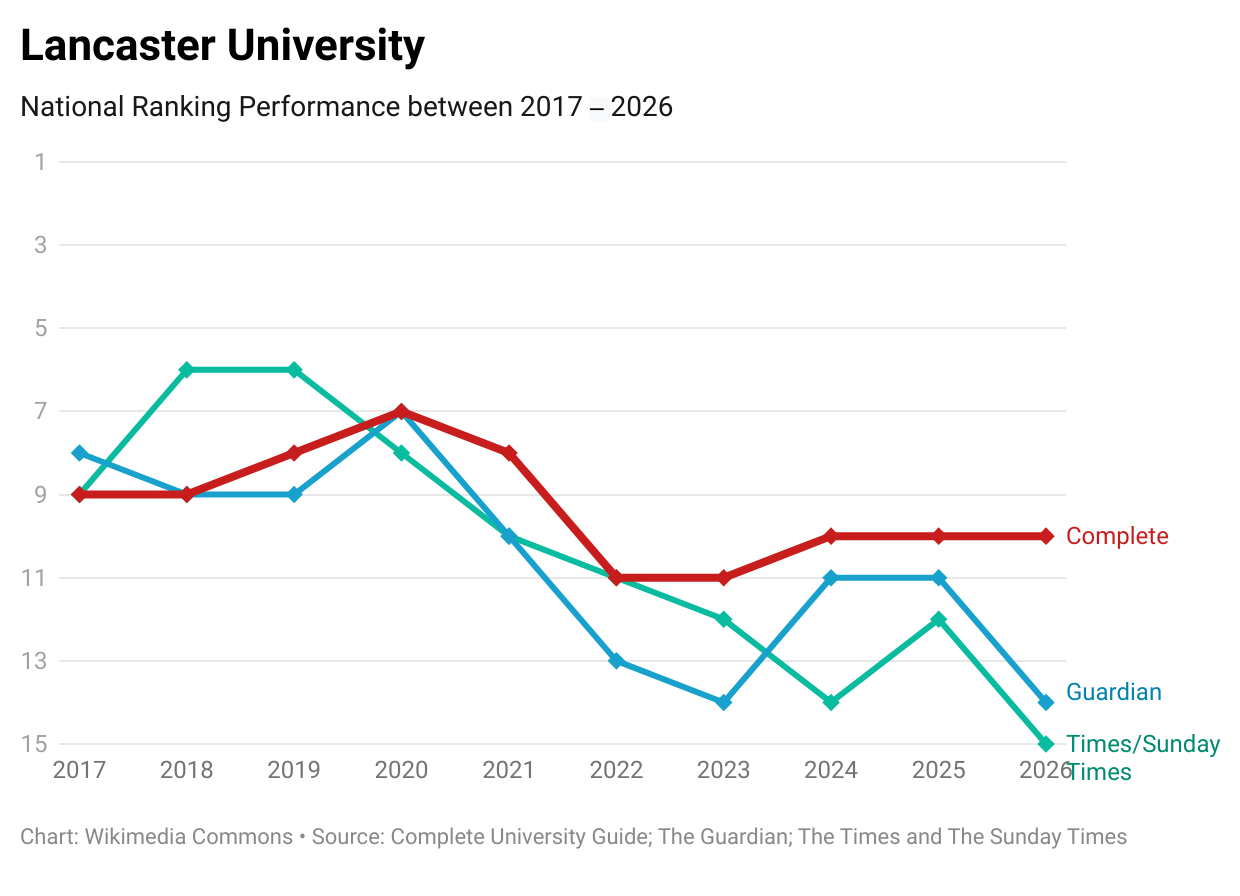
Lancaster University's national league table performance over the past ten years

In The Sunday Times 10-year (1998–2007) average ranking of British universities based on consistent league table performance, Lancaster was ranked joint 19th overall in the UK. As of recent years, the university has been placed within the top 30 by UK newspaper league tables and in the top 200 worldwide by the main global rankings (see information box for current rankings). It was also ranked the top university in the north-west of England for all ten years of recordings by The Complete University Guide.

In 2014, its 50th year, Lancaster University was ranked 10th in the THE 100 Under 50, a list of the world's best universities under 50 years old. It also appeared in the lists of QS 50 under 50 in all the years before 2014 when it was under 50 years old.

=== Joint programmes ===
Lancaster University partnered with Sunway University, Malaysia to offer dual awards undergraduate program since 2006.

Lancaster University entered into a dual degree program with the COMSATS Institute of Information Technology (CIIT), Lahore. It simultaneously offered two degrees, from CIIT and Lancaster University; graduates would be alumni of both universities. This was the first programme between a UK and a Pakistani university. However, the dual nature of the programme proved problematic and the relationship ended.

In 2017, Lancaster University announced its involvement in the launch of higher education institution, University Academy 92, alongside members of Manchester United's Class of '92: Gary Neville, Ryan Giggs, Paul Scholes, Phil Neville and Nicky Butt. University Academy 92 (UA92) officially opened its doors in 2019, with all degrees accredited by Lancaster University. UA92 offers undergraduate degrees organised around four main specialist subject areas: Business, Media, Sport and Digital, with a vision to make higher education more accessible for all.

=== Programmes abroad ===
In October 2013, Lancaster University announced the opening of a branch campus in Accra, Ghana, to serve the population of Ghana and all of Africa, providing a British university-level education locally to those students. The campus is operated in partnership with Transnational Academic Group Ghana Limited, and offers undergraduate and graduate programmes in management, business, Economics & international relations, Politics & International Relations, Accounting & Finance, Marketing, computer science, law and psychology along with an EMBA programme.

In 2020, Lancaster opened a new branch campus in Germany, Lancaster University Leipzig. The campus is operated in partnership with Navitas. Programmes offered in Leipzig are equivalent to their counterparts in Lancaster, and students receive their degree from Lancaster University upon graduation.

Lancaster opened the Joint Institute for Environmental Research and Education (JIE) in Guangzhou, China in 2016, in partnership with the South China Agricultural University (SCAU). A joint Environmental Science undergraduate degree began in September 2016 with students spending two years at each institution.

The Chinese Ministry of Education gave permission in April 2016 for Lancaster to establish Lancaster University College - Beijing Jiaotong University in Weihai, Shandong province.

=== Research ===
Lancaster's research income for 2021-22 was £48.1 million. In the 2014 Research Excellence Framework assessment, Lancaster was ranked 18th out of 128 UK universities, including 13th for the percentage of world-leading research. The university places a particular focus on interdisciplinary research, encouraging collaborative research across academic departments.

In 2012, Lancaster University announced a partnership with the UK's biggest arms company, (BAE Systems), and four other North-Western universities (Liverpool, Salford, UCLAN and Manchester) in order to work on the Gamma Programme which aims to develop "autonomous systems". According to the University of Liverpool when referring to the programme, "autonomous systems are technology based solutions that replace humans in tasks that are mundane, dangerous and dirty, or detailed and precise, across sectors, including aerospace, nuclear, automotive and petrochemicals".

==== Physics ====
Lancaster University's Physics Department is rated 46% for "world-leading" research with a further 50% rated "internationally excellent" research by REF2021. There are five main research groups within the department: astrophysics, particle and accelerator physics, experimental condensed matter, and theory. The Particle Physics Research Division collaborate with others at CERN, Fermilab, KEK, and SNOLAB. Lancaster's research involvement with CERN consists of work with the Neutrino (NP03, NP04, NP07), CTF3, RE, LHC, SPS and R&D research programmes.

== Student life ==
=== Students' Union ===
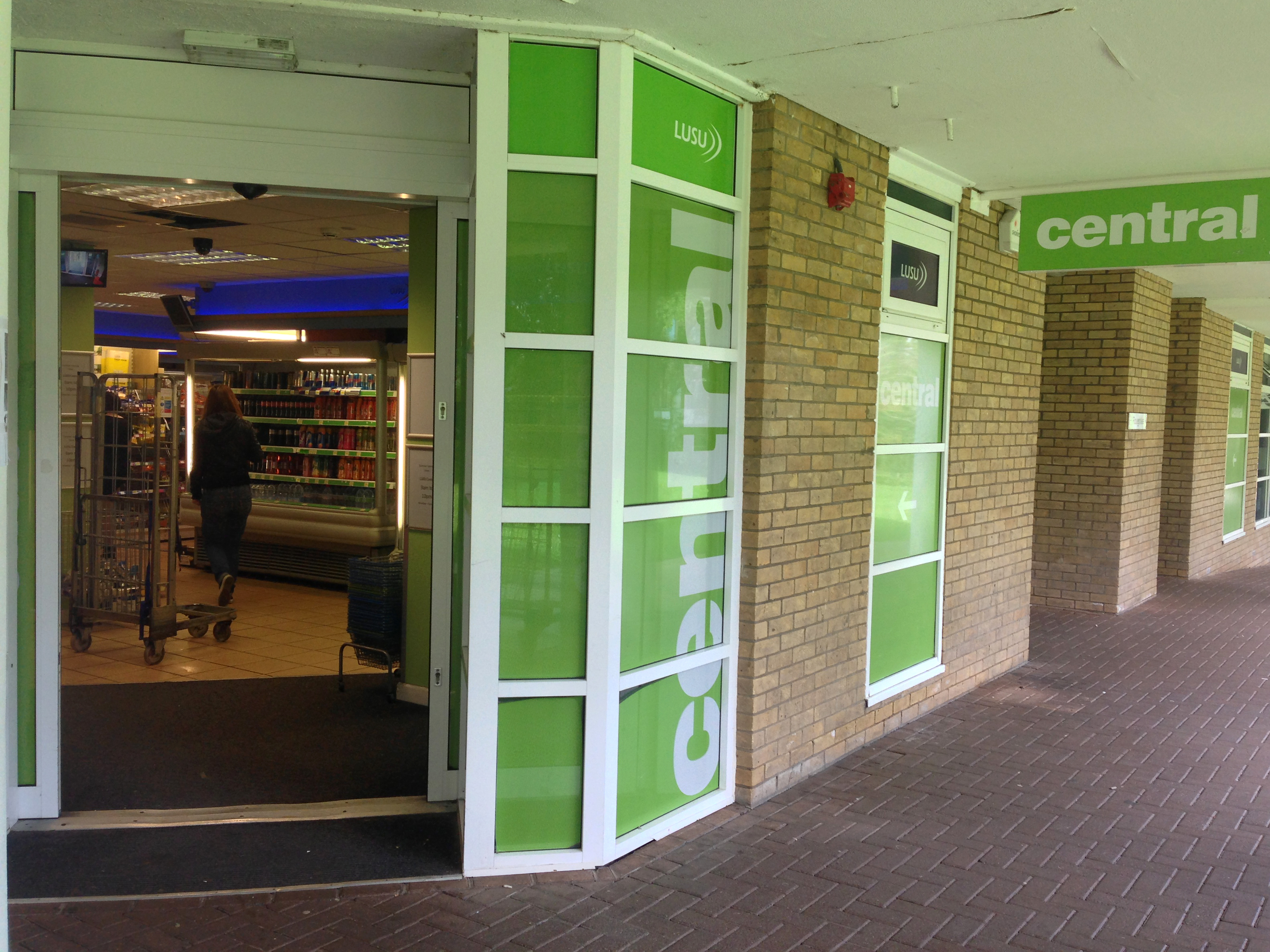
LUSU-run convenience store, located near Pendle/Grizedale College

Lancaster University Students' Union (LUSU) is the representative body of students at the university. Unusually, there is no main union building. Instead, the union is organised through the eight college JCRs, each of which has its own social venues and meeting spaces. The union is, however, allocated an administration building by the university. SCAN (acronym for Student Comments And News) is the union's newspaper and was established in 1967. LUSU owns a dual-room, 1,100 capacity nightclub in Lancaster called The Sugarhouse (which survived an attempt to close it in 2019) and also operated an off campus housing agency LUSU Living. It operated a shop until it closed in July 2025.

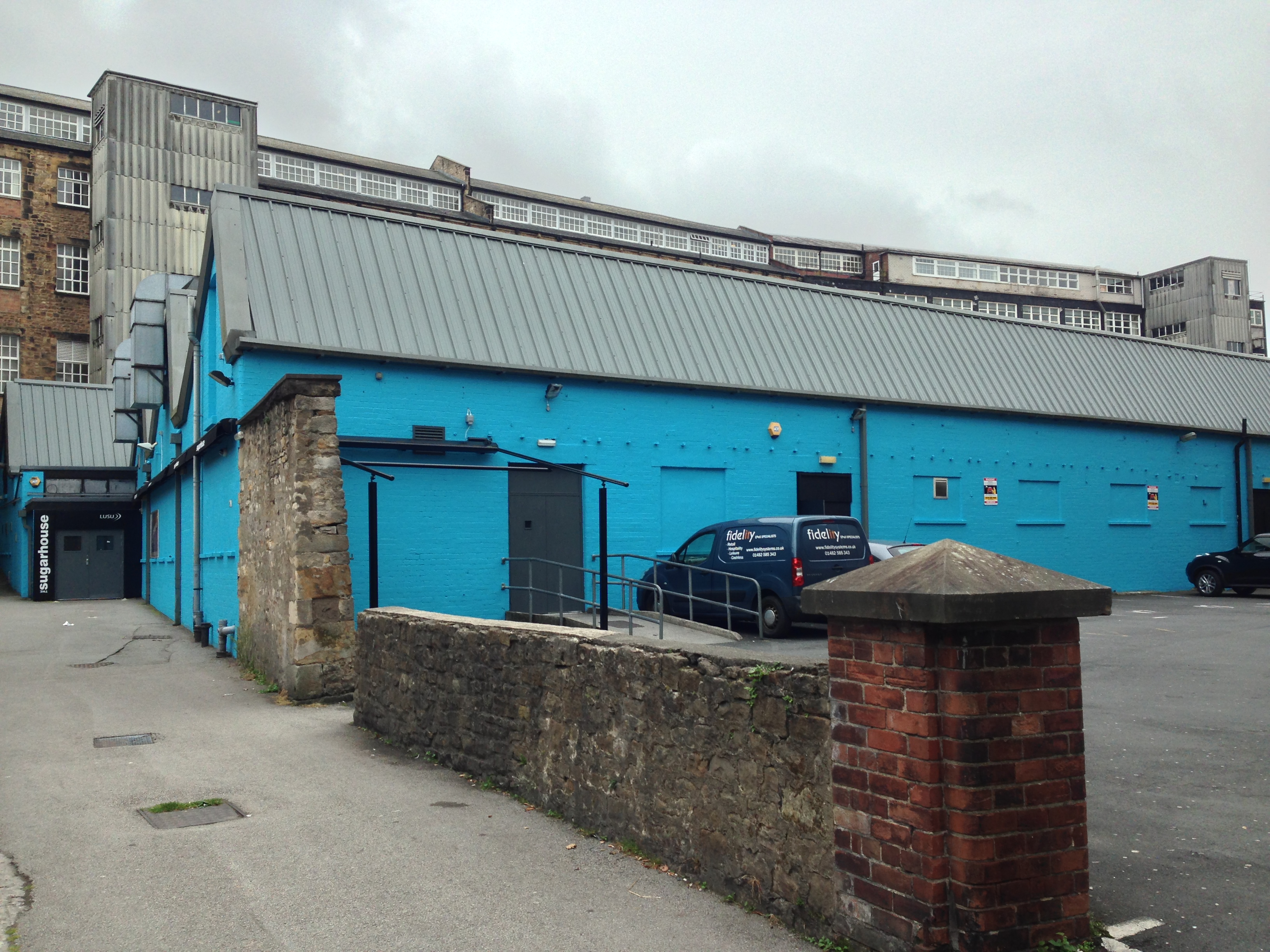
The Sugarhouse nightclub

LUSU also helps to support LUSU Involve, a volunteering unit allowing Lancaster University students to become involved with communities locally and internationally.

There are over 175 different societies operating within Lancaster University. Common areas include sports, hobbies, politics, academic, culture and religion. There are several fairs during the Freshers period in which various clubs and societies promote themselves.

=== Chancellor's Wharf ===
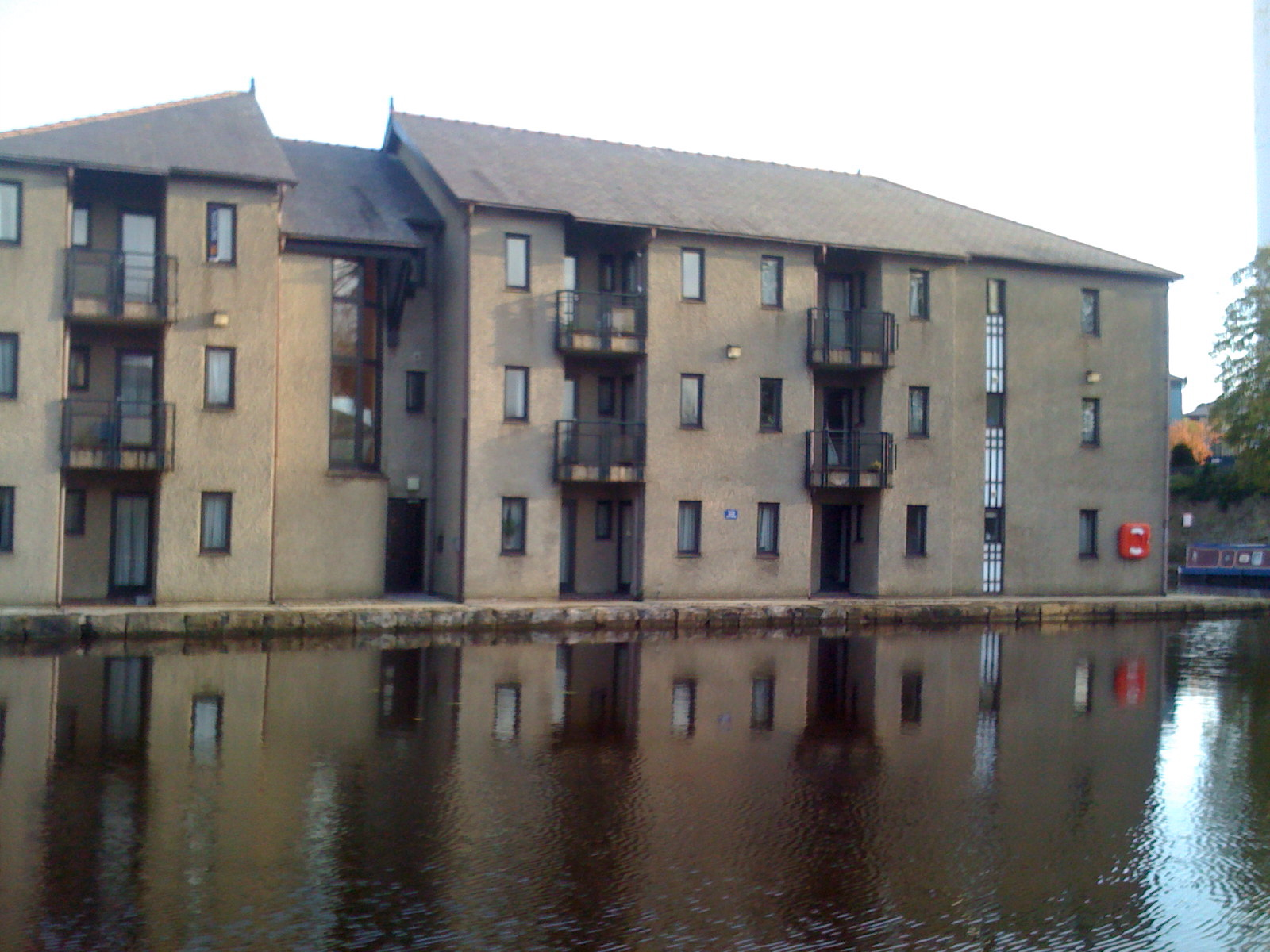
Chancellor's Wharf accommodation, located off-campus

Chancellor's Wharf is off-campus student accommodation. It consists of three buildings by the Lancaster canal on Aldcliffe Road. The location is near the city centre, opposite 'the Water Witch' pub and the Royal Lancaster Infirmary. It is open to members of all of the university's colleges. Residents remain members of their various colleges, with Chancellor's Wharf itself being only a hall of residence.

=== Sport ===
Every summer term the students take part in the Roses Tournament against the University of York, this is often described as the biggest varsity competition in Europe. The venue of the event alternates annually between Lancaster and York. The competition takes its name from the 15th-century civil war, the War of the Roses, and is organised by the universities' respective student unions, LUSU and YUSU.

Lancaster University Athletics Club (LUAC) was formed in May 2011. The start of the 2011/12 academic year saw the first athletes join the club and by the end of the year receive awards for LUSU 'Society of the Year 2012' and were winners of the Lancaster Athletics Cup 2012. In the 2012/13 academic year the club was given the opportunity to compete in BUCS and Roses along with other sporting societies at Lancaster University.

Lancaster University Swimming and Water Polo Club (LUSWP, formally known as LUST) competes in both BUCS and Roses in the sports swimming and water polo. The swimming team also competes in other charity galas, such as Quest for The Crest, held at Manchester Aquatics Centre. The BUCS swimming competitions include BUCS Short Course National Championships, BUCS Team Championships, and BUCS Long Course Championships, of which there has recently been attendance from Olympic swimmers such as James Guy and 50m & 100m World Champion Adam Peaty. In addition, the water polo team competes in the UPOLO league. LUSWP won the Lancaster University 'Club of the Year' in both academic years 2015/2016, and 2016/2017.

==== Intercollegiate sport ====
A number of intercollegiate sporting events exist within the university. Leagues exist in football, netball, pool, darts and dominoes. Pool, darts and dominoes collectively form an overall "bar sports" league known as the George Wyatt Cup. The Carter Shield is contested between every college with bi-weekly matches open to all, and is intended as a light-hearted competition to promote lesser-known sports.

There are also a number of annual sporting events between specific colleges:

- Founders is contested every year between Bowland and Lonsdale, the two oldest colleges at the university. The competition was created in 2004 to ensure that the friendly rivalry between the two colleges would continue after Lonsdale's relocation meant they would no longer be neighbours. The 2018 Founders series was officially cancelled after disagreements between the two colleges, but continued unofficially under the tongue-in-cheek name "Undergrounders".
- Legends was formerly contested between Grizedale, County, Pendle and Fylde colleges. Following Fylde and subsequently County's withdrawal in 2017, it was replaced by Titans (County/Fylde) and Warriors (Grizedale/Pendle).
- Patriots is contested between Furness and Cartmel Colleges.

=== Arts, media and culture ===
Alongside sport, Lancaster University has a vast selection of arts societies across campus in the areas of performance, media and music. Examples of performance-based societies include Lancaster University Theatre Group (LUTG), the Comedy Institute, Lancaster University Film Production (LUFP), University of Lancaster Music society (ULMS), and HipHop and Breakdance. There is also the Vagina Monolancs, a student-run group performing the Vagina Monologues, raising awareness of domestic violence against women and girls. In addition, the four established student media groups consist of the student radio station Bailrigg FM, the student newspaper SCAN established in 1967 and the student union's television station LA1TV as well as Take 2 Cinema, an on-campus cinema, based in Bowland Main Lecture Theatre which was established in 1964.

=== Religious groups ===
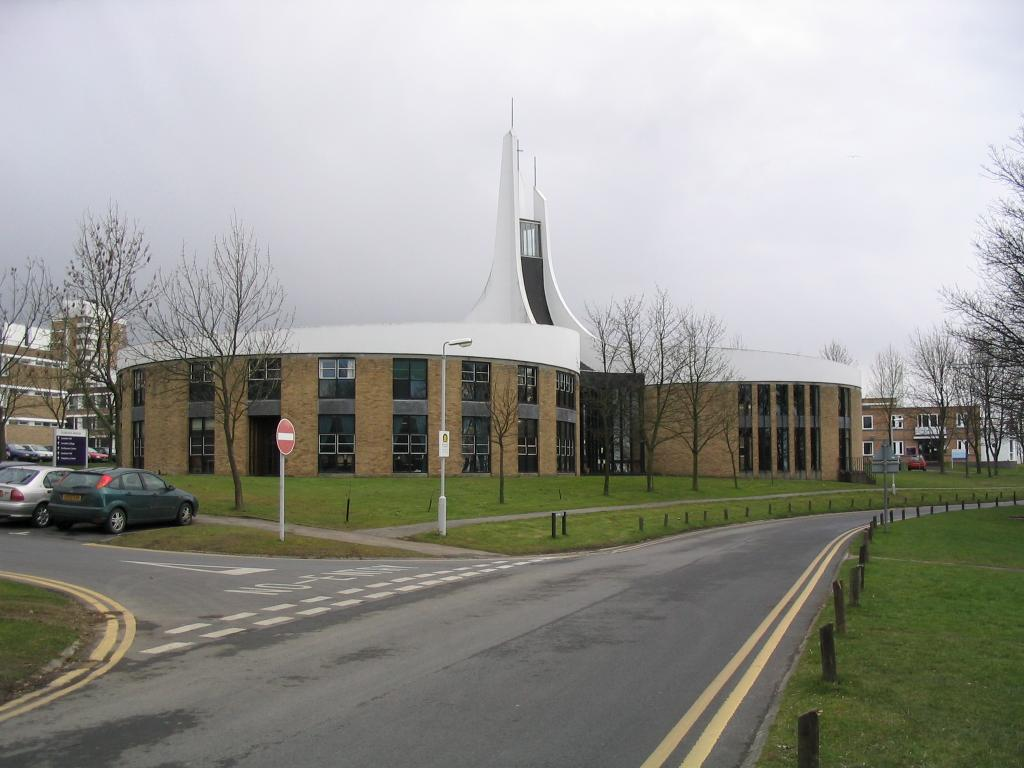
The Chaplaincy Centre, with its iconic spire and three lobes

The Lancaster University Chaplaincy Centre is located at the north end of campus incorporating various religious groups such as Christian (Anglicans, Catholics, Orthodox, Quakers), Jewish, Buddhist, and Hindu as well as various religious societies including the Bahá'í, the Chinese Christian Fellowship, the Postgrad and Mature Students Group, and the Pagan society which hold regular events and meetings. The Islamic Prayer Rooms are located across from the Chaplaincy Centre, in Ash House.

== Notable people ==
=== Alumni ===
==== Arts ====
- Roger Ashton-Griffiths, Music (1978, Furness) – Actor and director
- Damian Barr, Sociology and English Literature (1998, Bowland) and MA Contemporary Sociology (2000) – Journalist and writer
- John Vincent Beckett, (1971 & Doctorate 1975) – Historian
- Paula Brackston, MA Creative Writing – Writer
- Lucy Briers, Independent Studies (1988, Cartmel) – Actress
- Brian Clegg, Operational Research (1977, Bowland) – Author of popular science books
- Joseph Delaney, English (1975, Lonsdale) – Writer
- TJ Dema, MA Creative Writing – Poet
- Simon Emmerson, Independent Studies (1978, Bowland) – Musician
- Emily Fleeshman, Theatre Studies (2007) – Actress
- Andrew Ford, Music (1978, Cartmel) – Composer
- Matthew Fort, English and French Literature (1968) – Food writer and critic
- Liam Gerrard, Theatre Studies (2004, Grizedale) – Actor
- John Haywood, History – Historian
- Rainer Hersch, Economics (1985, Cartmel) – Comedian and musician
- Ursula Holden-Gill, Theatre Studies (1999, Graduate College) – Actress
- Janni Howker, Independent Studies (1980, Cartmel) and MA Creative Writing (1984) – Writer of teenage fiction
- Tez Ilyas, Biochemistry (2004) – Comedian
- Ralph Ineson, Theatre Studies (1991, Furness) – Actor
- Daniel Ings, Theatre Studies (2008) – Actor, including in Netflix hit series The Gentlemen.
- Karen Lloyd, Creative Writing – Author and environmentalist
- Sangu Mandanna, English Literature and Creative Writing (2010) - Author
- Rachel Mann, Philosophy (1991) and MA Philosophy (1993) - Priest and poet
- Ursula Martinez, French and Theatre Studies – Performance artist
- Andrew Miller, Creative Writing (1997) – Novelist
- Caroline Moir, English Literature – Author
- Piri, Chemistry (2020) – Musician
- Andy Serkis, Independent Studies (1985, County) – Actor. He is on the List of highest-grossing actors of all time.
- Dean Sullivan, Teaching Degree – Actor (Played Jimmy Corkhill in Brookside)
- Jo Walton, (1985) - Writer
- Sarah Waters, English Literature (1988, Graduate College) – Author
- Peter Whalley, Philosophy (1967, Lonsdale) – Writer

==== Business and Economics ====
- W. Brian Arthur, Operational Research (1967) – Economist
- John C. Hull, Operational Research (1969) – Economist
- Antony Burgmans, Marketing (1971, Bowland) – Former Chairman of Unilever (until 2007)
- Richard Cuthbertson, Management Science (1986) – Research Director of the Oxford Institute of Retail Management, Oxford University
- Jon Moulton, Chemistry (1973, Furness) – Founder, Better Capital
- Mark Price, Classics and Archaeology (1982, Bowland) – Managing Director of Waitrose
- Bruce Sewell, Psychology (1979, Bowland) – Former Senior Vice President and General Counsel, Apple
- Ashni Singh, Accounting and Finance (2000, Graduate College) - Minister of Finance, Guyana
- Dave Snowden, Philosophy (1975, County) – Knowledge Management researcher and consultant
- Nahed Taher, Economics (2001, Graduate College) – CEO, Gulf One Investment

==== Education ====
- Alfred Morris, Accounting and Finance (1970, Graduate College) – Former Vice-Chancellor of University of West of England (until 2006)
- Belinda Probert, PhD in Politics (1976) – Former deputy Vice-Chancellor, La Trobe University (2008–2012)
- Mimi Sheller, PG Cert Learning and Teaching in Higher Education (2003) – Professor of Sociology, Drexel University

==== Linguistics ====
- Paul Baker, PhD in Applied Linguistics – Professor of Linguistics, Lancaster University
- Norman Fairclough, PhD – Emeritus Professor of Linguistics, Lancaster University
- Veronika Koller, PhD in Applied Linguistics – Professor of Linguistics, Lancaster University
- Sarah Mercer, PhD in Applied linguistics (2008) – Professor of Linguistics, University of Graz
- Elena Semino, PhD in Applied Linguistics – Professor of Linguistics, Lancaster University
- Jane Sunderland, PhD in Applied Linguistics – Professor of Linguistics, Lancaster University

==== Media ====
- Richard Allinson, Economics (1980, Fylde) – Radio presenter
- Louis Barfe, Politics (1995, Fylde) – Journalist
- Stewart Binns, Politics and Modern History (c.1971?) – Filmmaker and author
- Robert Fisk, English Literature (1968, Lonsdale) – Middle East correspondent, The Independent
- James May, Music (1985, Pendle) – Television presenter, best known for Top Gear
- Warren Nettleford, History and Politics (2004, County) – Reporter and Television presenter
- Satnam Rana, French Studies (1999, Grizedale) – Television presenter
- Ranvir Singh, English and Philosophy (1998, Pendle) – Television presenter
- Anthony Tucker-Jones, International Relations and Strategic Studies (1988) – Military historian and author

==== Politics and Law ====
- Taye Atske Selassie, PhD in Political Science, International Relations, and Strategic Studies – President of Ethiopia
- Audrey Azoulay, Business Administration (1993) – French politician and former Minister of Culture
- Paul Bristow, History and Politics (Cartmel) – Former MP for Peterborough
- Sir Alan Campbell, Politics (1978, Furness) – MP for Tynemouth
- Simon Danczuk, Sociology (1992, Cartmel) – Former MP for Rochdale
- Hilton Dawson, Social Admin (1982, Pendle) – Former MP for Lancaster and Wyre
- Suzanne Evans, Religious Studies (1987, Cartmel) – Former Deputy Chairman of the UK Independence Party
- Jo Grady, General Secretary of the University and College Union (UCU)
- Theresa Griffin, English and Theatre Studies (1984, Cartmel) and MA Theatre Studies (1985) – Former MEP for North West England
- Rami Hamdallah, Linguistics (1988, Graduate College) – Former Prime Minister of the Palestinian National Authority
- Ruth Henig, Baroness Henig, PhD in History (1978) – Academic and Deputy Speaker in the House of Lords
- Joan Humble, History (1972, Lonsdale) – Former MP for Blackpool North and Fleetwood
- Alan Milburn, History (1979, Pendle) – Chancellor of Lancaster University and former MP for Darlington
- Michael Payne, Law (2008, Cartmel) – MP for Gedling
- Colin Pickthall, Creative Writing (1967, Lonsdale) – Former MP for Lancashire West
- Tim Roca, History (2007, Fylde) – MP for Macclesfield
- Cat Smith, Sociology and Gender Studies (2006, Cartmel) – MP for Lancaster and Fleetwood
- Helen Southworth, English (1978, Lonsdale) – Former MP for Warrington South
- Baddegama Samitha Thero, Comparative Religions and Third World Development (1988) – Former MP of Parliament of Sri Lanka
- Christian Wakeford, Politics (2007, Grizedale) – MP for Bury South
- Michael Wheeler, Politics (2006, Grizedale) – MP for Worsley and Eccles

==== Science and Engineering ====
- David Favis-Mortlock, Environmental Sciences (1975, Furness) – Environmental Change Institute, University of Oxford
- Ng Cho-nam, PhD in Environmental Sciences – Associate Professor of Geography, University of Hong Kong
- Raoni Rajão, PhD in Organisation, Work and Technology – Associate Professor of Production Engineering, Federal University of Minas Gerais and Director for Deforestation Control Policies, Ministry of Environment and Climate Change (Brazil)
- Lucy Rogers, BEng Engineering (1995, Fylde) and PhD in engineering (2001) – Inventor and Science Communicator

==== Sport ====
- Louie Hinchliffe, Business and IT – Team GB athlete
- Philip Nicholson, Northumberland cricketer
- Jason Queally, Biological Sciences (1992, Bowland) – Cyclist

== See also ==
- Armorial of UK universities
- List of universities in the United Kingdom
- Plate glass university

== Bibliography ==
- Masterplan 2007–2017 Part 1
- Masterplan 2007–2017 Part 2
