= Graduate College, Lancaster =

Constituent college of the University of Lancaster

Coordinates: 54.00465°N 2.78773°W

Graduate College
- University of Lancaster
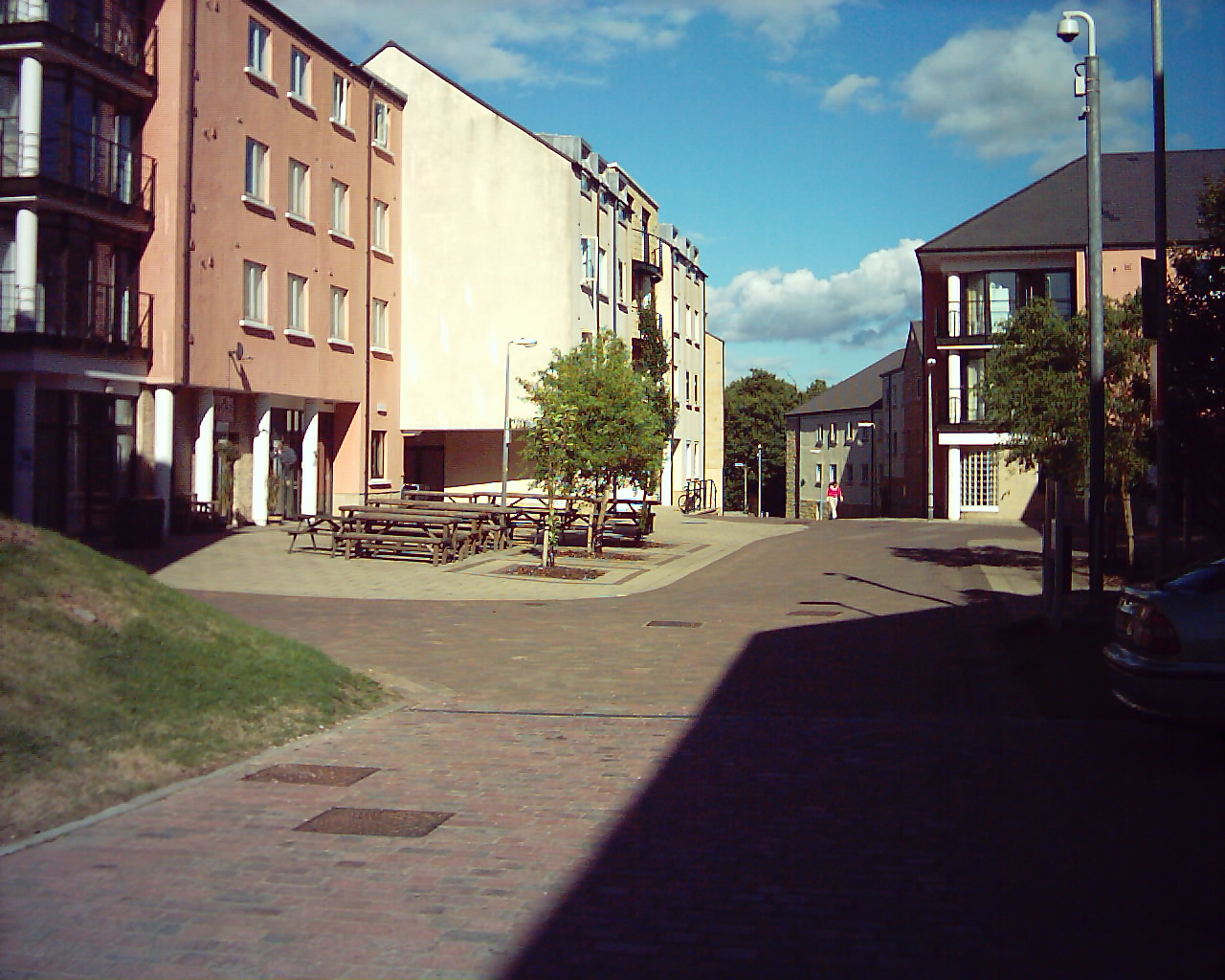
- College buildings at Alexandra Park

- Motto: Curiositas nostrum viam illuminat (Latin)
- Motto in English: Curiosity lights our way
- Established: 1989
- Named for: Graduate students
- Principal: Dr James McDowell
- Postgraduate Board Chair: Finn Van Breugel
- Dean: Martin Colclough (maternity leave cover)
- Postgraduates: 5,212
- Website: Graduate College

Graduate College is the largest college at Lancaster University, and only postgraduate college. The college's membership consists of all postgraduate students at the university, including Lancaster graduates who were members of other colleges as undergraduates.

== History ==
Until its creation in 1989 (although its own purpose-built accommodation on South-West campus was not opened until 1996) each of the other eight colleges also took postgraduates. The university had a lot of success in postgraduate work, and it was felt postgraduates should have their own college for social, administrative and accommodation purposes.

In 2019, the college revised its logo and colours, as well as adopting its current motto. The new logo, chosen from over 70 submissions, was the combination of two designs by students Igor Sidnev and Joe Rawcliffe, and was launched in August 2019 as Claire Povah's final act as College Principal. The owl is described as representing wisdom and curiosity, and the rose the city of Lancaster.

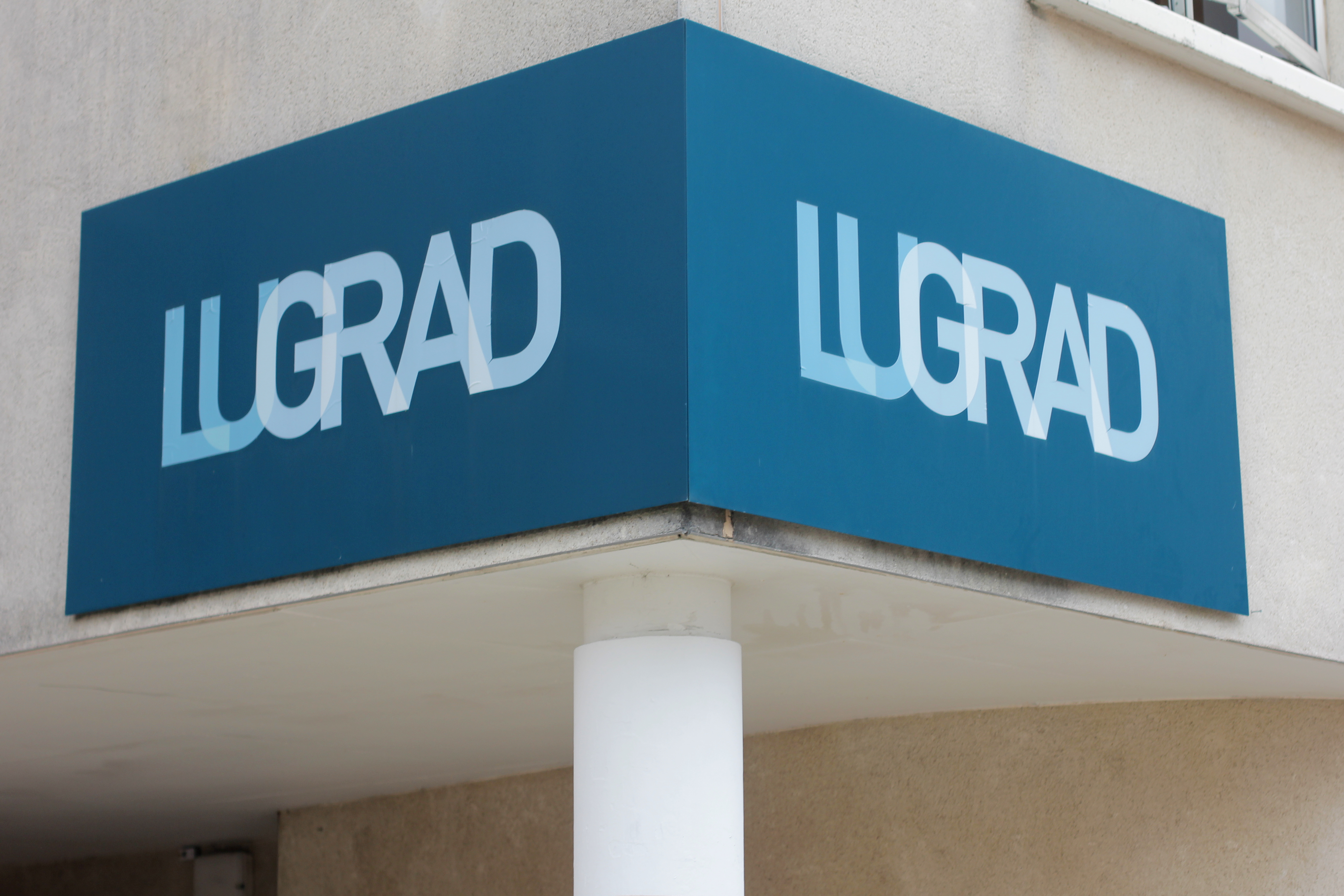
Signage at Graduate College, showing the pre-2019 logo and colours

== Facilities ==
The college bar, the Herdwick, is known for its large beer festivals, its constant supply of real ale and a variety of whiskies. It is listed in the Good Beer Guide, one of three student bars in the country to be included. The bar is also known for its weekly live music nights, usually every Thursday when a mix of student and non-student bands play.

== Governance ==
According to the college constitution, the aims of the college are "to stimulate and support graduate studies at the University, to enhance the University's national and international academic reputation, and to advance knowledge, wisdom and understanding".

== Postgraduate Board ==
Instead of having a JCR, there is a Postgraduate Board (PG Board). The PG Board is a sub-committee of the Students' Union, of which all postgraduates are full members. The PG Board's goal is to raise postgraduate issues to the Students' Union and promote social engagement between students, focusing mainly on social events, and welfare and academic issues; it relies heavily on its parent organisation for most services and actively collaborates with the college. The PG Board is similar in structure to the JCR Executives seen in the undergraduate colleges, but is led by a chair (rather than a president), and includes a number of Members without Portfolio.

The current PG Board is composed of three members: Emma Gardiner, Jude Rowley, and Ritika Arora.

Chair	Emma Gardiner
PG Board Officer	Jude Rowley
Academic Officer	Ritika Arora

== Activities ==
- Day trips: The Graduate College hosts and coordinates a number of trips for students throughout the academic year, which are announced on their site, with tickets going on sale around two weeks prior to the date of the trip.
- New Cafe: The New Cafe is an opportunity for PhD students to present their work to other PhDs. Students hear about researches from their peers.
- Postgraduate Research Conference: The conference is a multidisciplinary conference providing delegates with the opportunity to present to, network with and learn from other students from other disciplines.

== Notable alumni ==
- Rami Hamdallah, Former Prime Minister of the Palestinian National Authority
- Alfred Morris, Former Vice-Chancellor of University of West of England (until 2006)
- Ashni Singh, Minister of Finance, Guyana
- Nahed Taher, CEO, Gulf One Investment
- Ursula Holden-Gill, Actress
- Sarah Waters, Author
