= InfoLab21 =

InfoLab21 is a research centre at Lancaster University focusing primarily on information and communication technologies. The centre was opened in 2005 by Patricia Hewitt in order to "transfer the knowledge, technology and innovation techniques that are strong within the university into the private sector." The centre houses the University's School of Computing and Communications and operates under the University's department of Science and Technology.
