= Lancaster Institute for the Contemporary Arts =

Art school of the University of Lancaster

- University of Lancaster
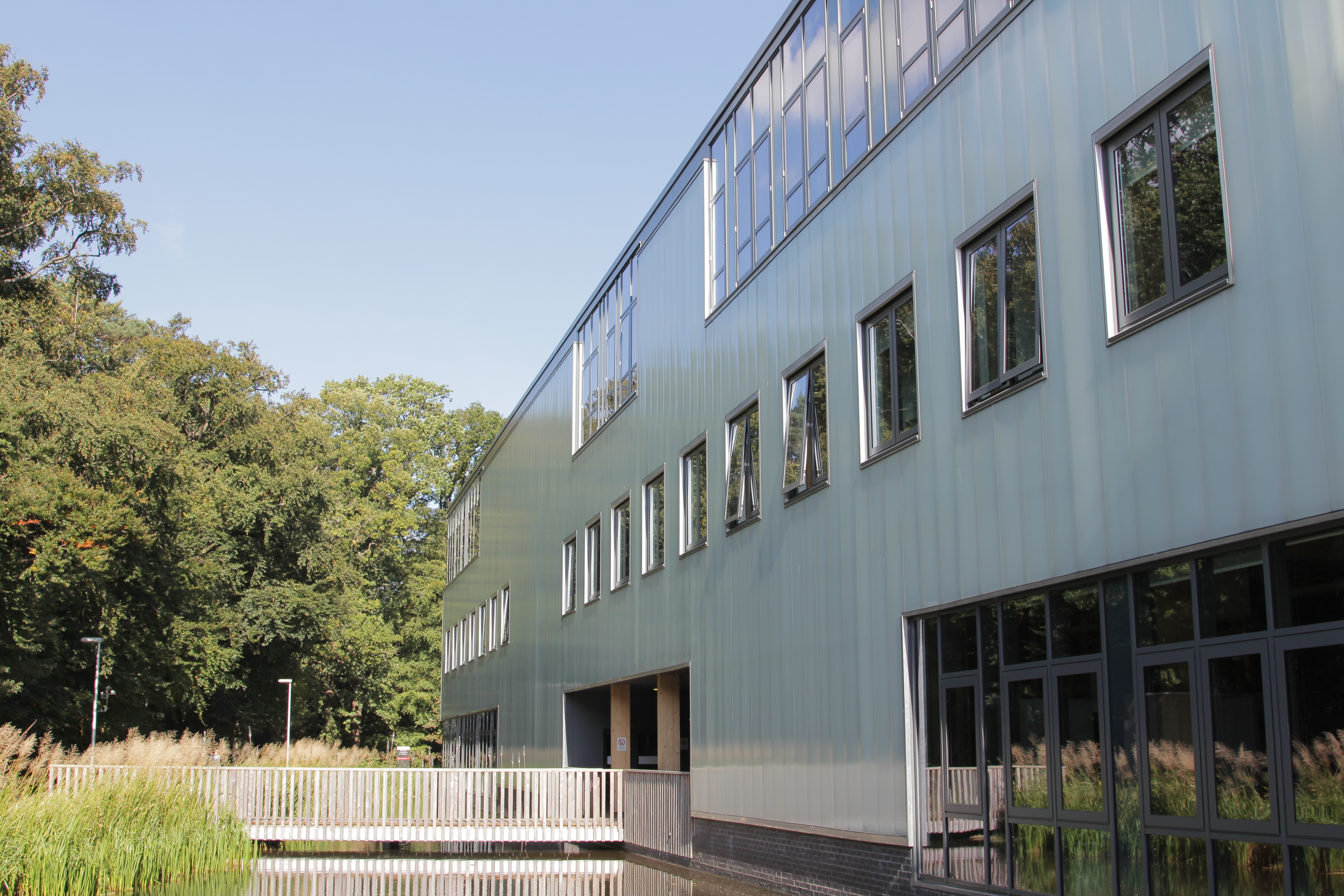
- LICA Building
- Type: Public Art School
- Established: 2005
- Parent institution: University of Lancaster
- Director: Prof. Judith Mottram
- Location: Lancaster, United Kingdom; 54°00′37″N 2°47′08″W
- Website: https://www.lancaster.ac.uk/lica/

The Lancaster Institute for the Contemporary Arts (known colloquially as LICA or The Lancaster Institute) is an academic institution, art school, and arm of the University of Lancaster, that delivers research and teaching in fields of contemporary art and design; including in the subject areas of Fine Art, Theatre, Design, and Film studies. The institute also houses two research centres: Insight and Imagination. LICA has a close working relationship with the public arts organisation: Lancaster Arts.

Notable academics include the Professors; Tim Etchells, Charlie Gere, Christopher Frayling KCMG, Kevin Roberts, Gerry Harris, and Rachel Cooper OBE; notable alumni include the television presenter James May, the composer Andrew Ford, the actor Andy Serkis, and winner of the BP Portrait Prize, Peter Monkman.

With a heavy research focus, in 2014, 100% of the research output was ranked internationally excellent or world leading. Teaching at LICA is ranked within the global top 100 universities, offering Art and Design courses, by the QS World Rankings., and is ranked consistently within the top 5 undergraduate art schools in the UK; ranked 2nd in 2014, and 3rd in 2015 and 2016.

== Departments ==
The Lancaster Institute is composed of four creative disciplines; these are, Art, Design, Film, and Theatre. A decision to expand the Department of Fine Art was enacted on in 2013, and the department accepted over 50% more applicants than the previous cohort, with an even larger intake proposed for the following year. The undergraduate Art course, with a strong theoretical element and with grade requirements of AAB, attracts highly academic students; these are some of the highest requirements for undergraduate Fine Art in the UK, just below the AAA requirement of The Ruskin School of Art. Recent graduates have proceeded to postgraduate art institutions, including The Royal College of Art and The Royal Academy Schools.

=== Research ===
==== Insight Research Centre ====
Insight is a creative research centre at Lancaster University specialising in theoretical, lab-based, and studio research in the disciplinary bases of, Fine Art, Theatre, Film, Dance and Sound. Opened in 2014, the research focus is on 'making meaning in the arts' and highlighting arts' significance and value in society. Speaking at the launch, the artist, Grayson Perry noted how judgements from critics of the arts are often of an "autistic" nature; refusing to seek meaning in the production and research of contemporary art, highlighting the importance of the institutes research activities.

==== Imagination Research Centre ====
The Imagination Research Centre conducts applied and theoretical research into design interactions. Research is centred around a combination of practice-based methods arising from design and the arts with science and social science methods, addressing contemporary challenges such as climate change and urban density LICA is also home to the prestigious course MA Design Management that was developed and managed for 10 years by Dr David Hands, who pioneered design management as a discipline in the west.

==== Highwire Doctoral Training Centre ====
The HighWire Doctoral Training Centre is a cross-disciplinary Centre for Doctoral Training (CDT) focusing on the Digital Economy. Research is projected as post-disciplinary, and attempting to find a creative fusion of the three underlying disciplines: Computer Science, Management and Design which underpin creative problem solving in relation to the digital economy.

==== The Creative Exchange ====
The Creative Exchange is a collaborative research and knowledge sharing collective between Lancaster University, Newcastle University and The Royal College of Art, which produces research and conferences on areas of designing experiences, digital prototyping and communication innovation. There is a particular focus on research of the digital public space with a significant proportion of research activities geared towards collaborative projects in this area.

=== Lancaster Arts at Lancaster University ===
Lancaster Arts at Lancaster University, formerly Live at LICA, is the institute's public arts organisation made up of the Peter Scott Gallery, the Nuffield Theatre and the Lancaster International Concert Series. In 2009, these three organisations were combined as one department by the University, initially termed 'The Public Arts' but later renamed 'Live at LICA' before becoming 'Lancaster Arts at Lancaster University' in 2015.

==== International Concert Series ====
Lancaster International Concert Series is the main provider of classical music in north Lancashire and Cumbria. Concerts are held within the Great Hall. Between October and March each year the series offers a varied diet of music which includes: orchestral concerts, chamber music, events for young people, jazz, family concerts and world music.

==== Art and Antique Collections ====
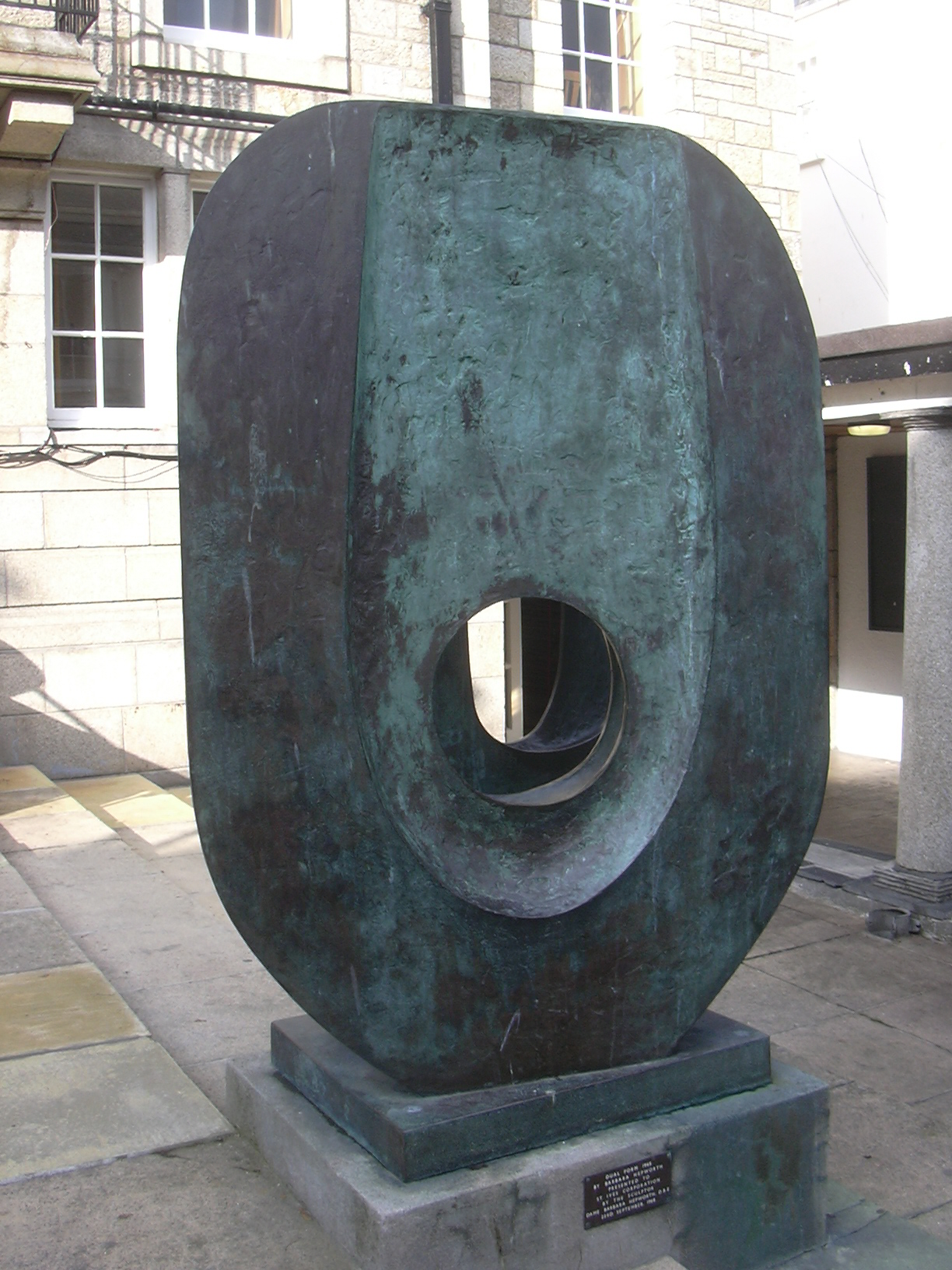
Barbara Hepworth's Dual Form, bronze, 1965, of which one is on permanent display at the University of Lancaster as part of the Peter Scott Gallery Collections

The Peter Scott Gallery holds significant collections of art and antique objects including a significant collection of Chinese and Japanese Art, as well as a collection of 20th-century art which includes work by artists from the St Ives School, Sir Terry Frost, Wilhelmina Barns-Graham, Barbara Hepworth and William Scott. Among other British artists whose work is represented are Norman Adams, Patrick Caulfield, Elisabeth Frink, Kenneth Martin and Winifred Nicholson. Recent acquisitions have included works by Andy Goldsworthy, Peter Howson and Albert Irvin. The university collection also includes prints by significant European artists such as Dürer, Miró, Ernst, Mondrian and Vasarely, and the Lancaster University Special Collections holds a collection of artists books and an archive of pop-up books.

The collection also includes a range of antiquities, many of which are on permanent display in the John Chambers Ceramics Room at The Peter Scott Gallery. It includes Roman, Greek, and Egyptian ceramic and glass vessels. Examples of items from the collection include a Roman stylus and an Egyptian papyrus fragment from the Book of the Dead. The Peter Scott Gallery also houses one of the most significant collections of Pilkington's Tile and Pottery Company in the UK.

== History ==
The Lancaster Institute for the Contemporary Arts was formed in 2005, with the aim of creating a 'critical mass' of arts subjects. Since this merger, Lancaster's Art degree has maintained top ten positions in numerous league tables, and is currently ranked third nationally in the Complete University Guide.

== Buildings ==
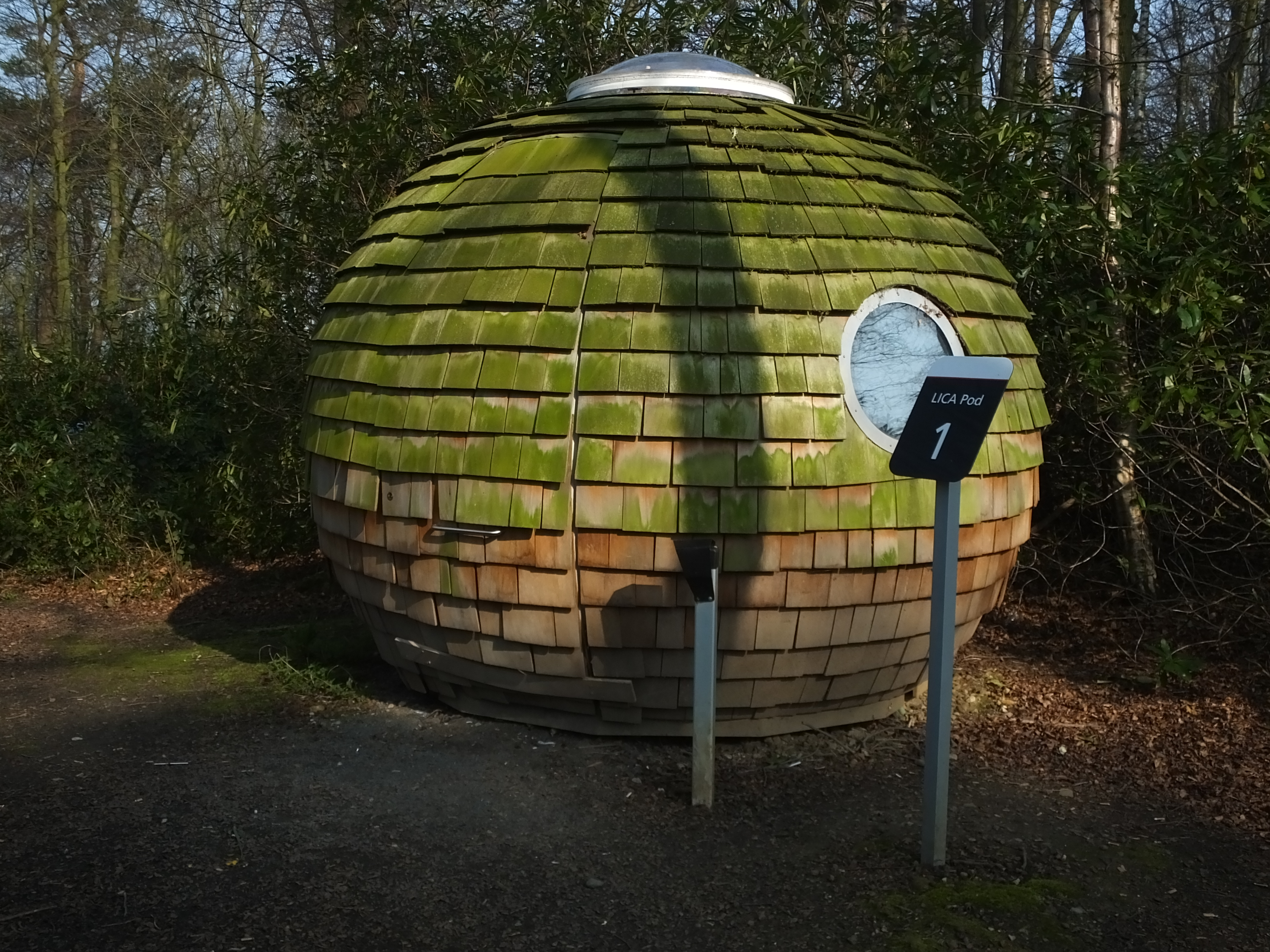
One of LICA's 'Pod' outbuildings, used as meeting spaces and seminar rooms

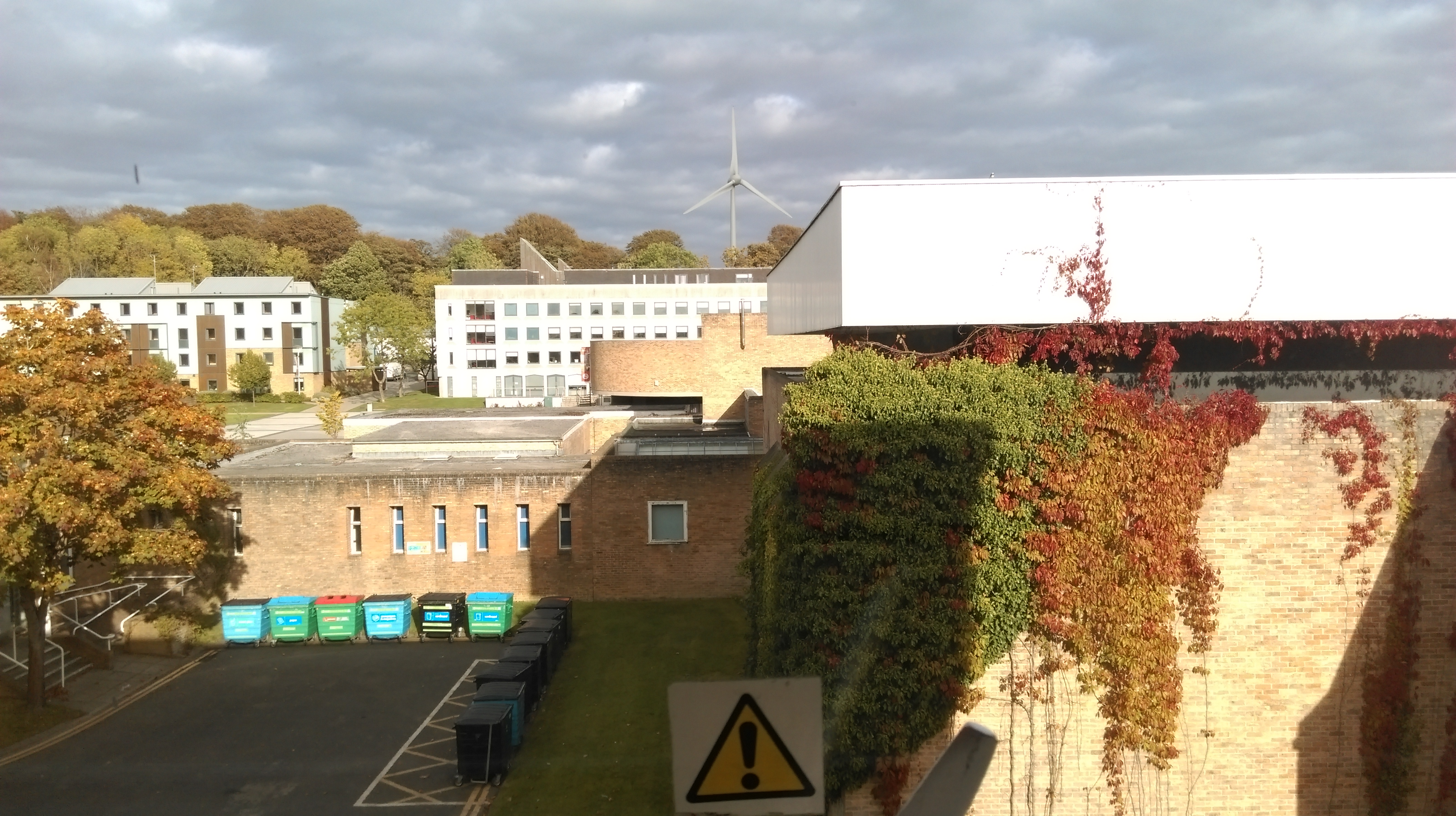
A view of The County College overlooking the old music building and Great Hall Complex, from the first floor art laboratory in Bowland Annex

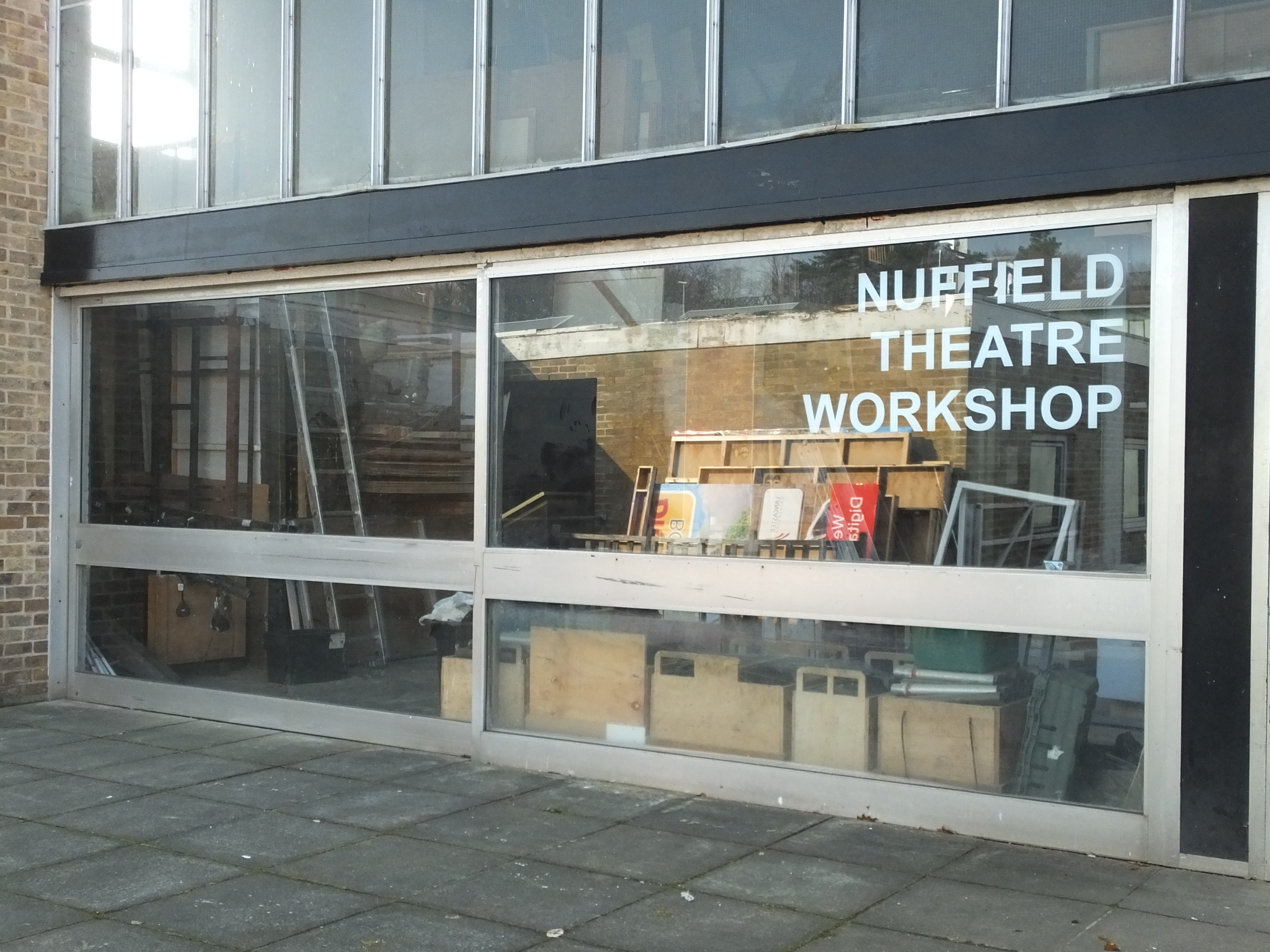
Nuffield Theatre Stage Workshop

The department is based between four buildings sited on the north side of the Bailrigg Campus of Lancaster University. The main building, known as The LICA Building was opened in 2010, designed by the architect James Jones of Sheppard Robson, and houses purpose build performance spaces, installation spaces, lecture spaces, seminar rooms, design laboratories and art studios as well as several small outbuildings used as student meeting rooms. In 2011 the Lancaster Institute for the Contemporary Arts (LICA) became the first higher education building and only the second building ever to receive a BREEAM Outstanding rating post-completion. The main Art building is the Bowland Annex, adjacent to the LICA Building, housing the rest of the Fine Art studios, an installation space, wood workshop, and practical teaching spaces.

The Great Hall Complex houses the Peter Scott Gallery, named after Sir Peter Markham Scott, the Nuffield Theatre, the Great Hall, The Jack Hilton Music Rooms, a purpose built theatre production workshop, rehearsal spaces, and a Life Drawing Studio. The Jack Hylton Music Rooms were named after the entertainer Jack Hylton. When it was opened in 1965, it was hoped that the rooms would make Lancaster into the music centre of the North West.

The Nuffield Theatre, a black-box theatre, is one of the largest and most adaptable professional studio theatres in Europe. It presents public performances in the fields of theatre, contemporary dance and live art from some of the best-known and respected companies from the UK and abroad.

The academic offices of the institute are based in the LICA Building, University of Lancaster.
