= Bailrigg =

University campus in Lancaster, England

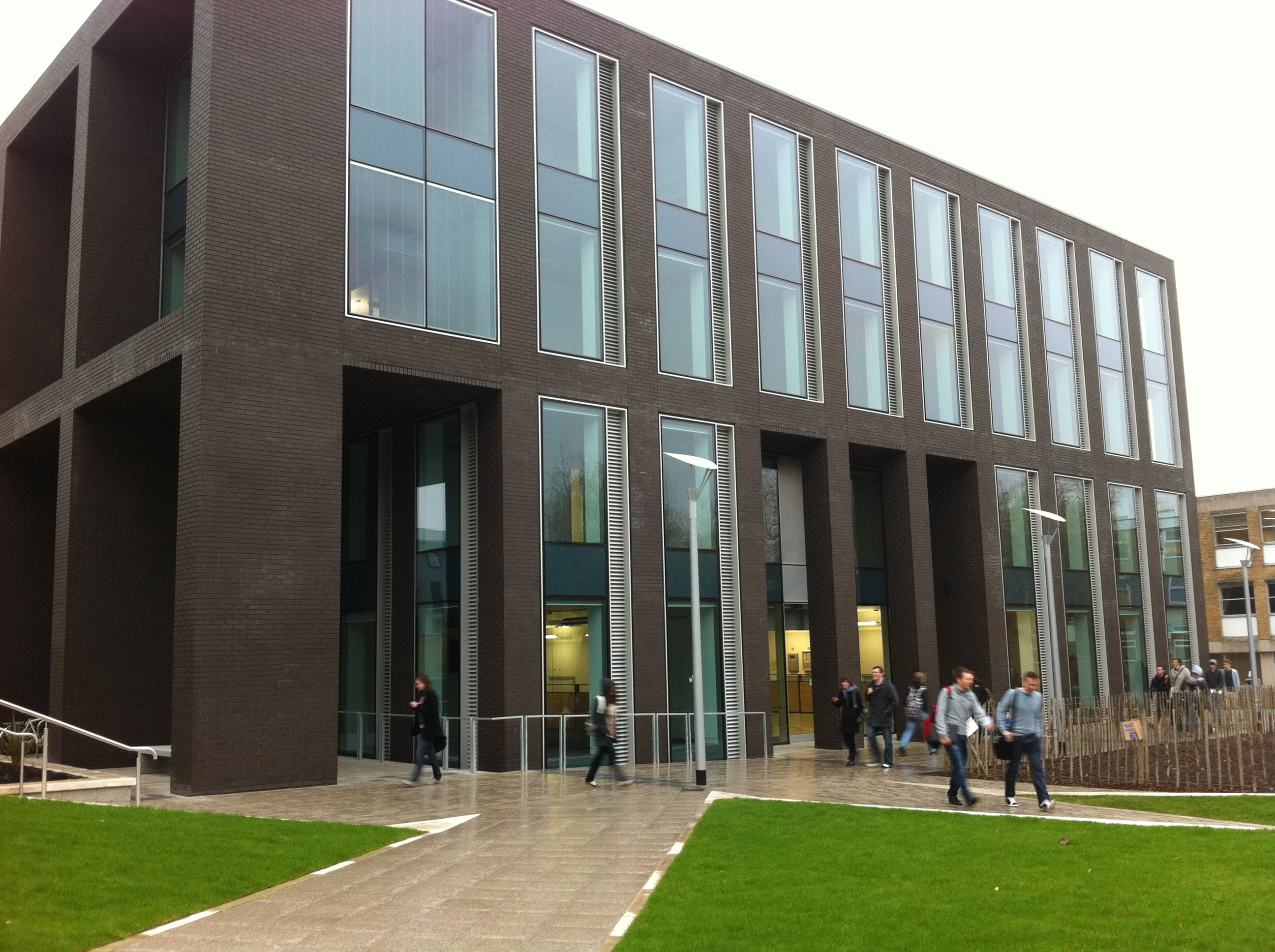
- The Charles Carter Building

- Location in Lancaster unparished area Location in the City of Lancaster district Location within Lancashire
- OS grid reference: SD4858
- District: City of Lancaster
- Shire county: Lancashire
- Region: North West
- Country: England
- Sovereign state: United Kingdom
- Post town: LANCASTER
- Postcode district: LA1, LA2
- Dialling code: 01524
- Police: Lancashire
- Fire: Lancashire
- Ambulance: North West
- UK Parliament: Lancaster and Wyre

Bailrigg is the campus of Lancaster University, in the City of Lancaster, Lancashire, England, 2 1/2 miles (4 kilometres) south of the centre of Lancaster. The student radio station Bailrigg FM is named after the site.

== History ==
We went up there on a windy day, and it was freezing cold. Every time we opened a plan it blew away. And we said Christ! What are we going to do with these students, where are they going to sit in the sun and all that? Well, we decided, it's got to be cloisters. All of the buildings have got to touch at the ground. We then devised this system and it had an absolutely firm principle: it had a great spine down the middle where everybody walked. That led everywhere. The cars were on the outside, on both sides. When you came into the spaces things were square, they were rectangular courtyards and they were all slightly different. There were two or three essentials: one was that the covered way had to be continuous, the buildings had to be three or four storeys high and connecting to the next one. I thought it worked very well.

— Peter Shepheard recalling the survey of the campus site

Bailrigg was a hamlet in the township of Scotforth and in some early deeds it was described as a manor. Its 2,880 acres were owned by Count Roger Pictavensis and his family, and afterwards the title fell to Cockersand Abbey. The settlement gave its name to a local family, Roger de Bailrigg and his descendants. In 1469 the land was granted to John Gardiner, who endowed Lancaster Royal Grammar School, and it went through numerous owners subsequently. In 1887 it was purchased by Thomas Storey, who founded the Storey Institute. He died in 1898 and the estate passed to his son Herbert Storey.

== Bailrigg House ==
Bailrigg House

General information
- Architectural style: Vernacular Revival (Arts and Crafts)
- Location: Bailrigg Lane, Lancaster, United Kingdom
- Coordinates: 54.01490°N 2.78754°W
- Construction started: 1899
- Completed: 1902

Design and construction
- Architecture firm: Woolfall and Eccles of Liverpool
- Designations

Listed Building – Grade II
- Official name: Bailrigg House
- Designated: 24 August 2005
- Reference no.: 1391378

Herbert Storey had Bailrigg House, also known as Bailrigg Mansion, built between 1899 and 1902 by Woolfall and Eccles of Liverpool. The landscape around Bailrigg House was also reoriented, and additional aspects added, with some of the work done by landscape architect Thomas Hayton Mawson. In 1921, Storey moved to Wiltshire, and the estate was bought by James Travis-Clegg, who lived there until he died in 1942. In 1944, the estate was bought by Barton Townley, a local car dealer. He agreed to sell the estate to the City of Lancaster for £50,000 in 1961, and eventually did so in 1963, in order to make way for the new University of Lancaster.

== University Campus ==
The new university buildings were designed by Gabriel Epstein and Peter Shepheard.

In January 2017, Bailrigg was chosen by the government as the site of a new garden village, with up to 5,000 new homes. Work on this was suspended in 2023 while a revised Local Plan is prepared by Lancaster City Council.

== Gallery ==
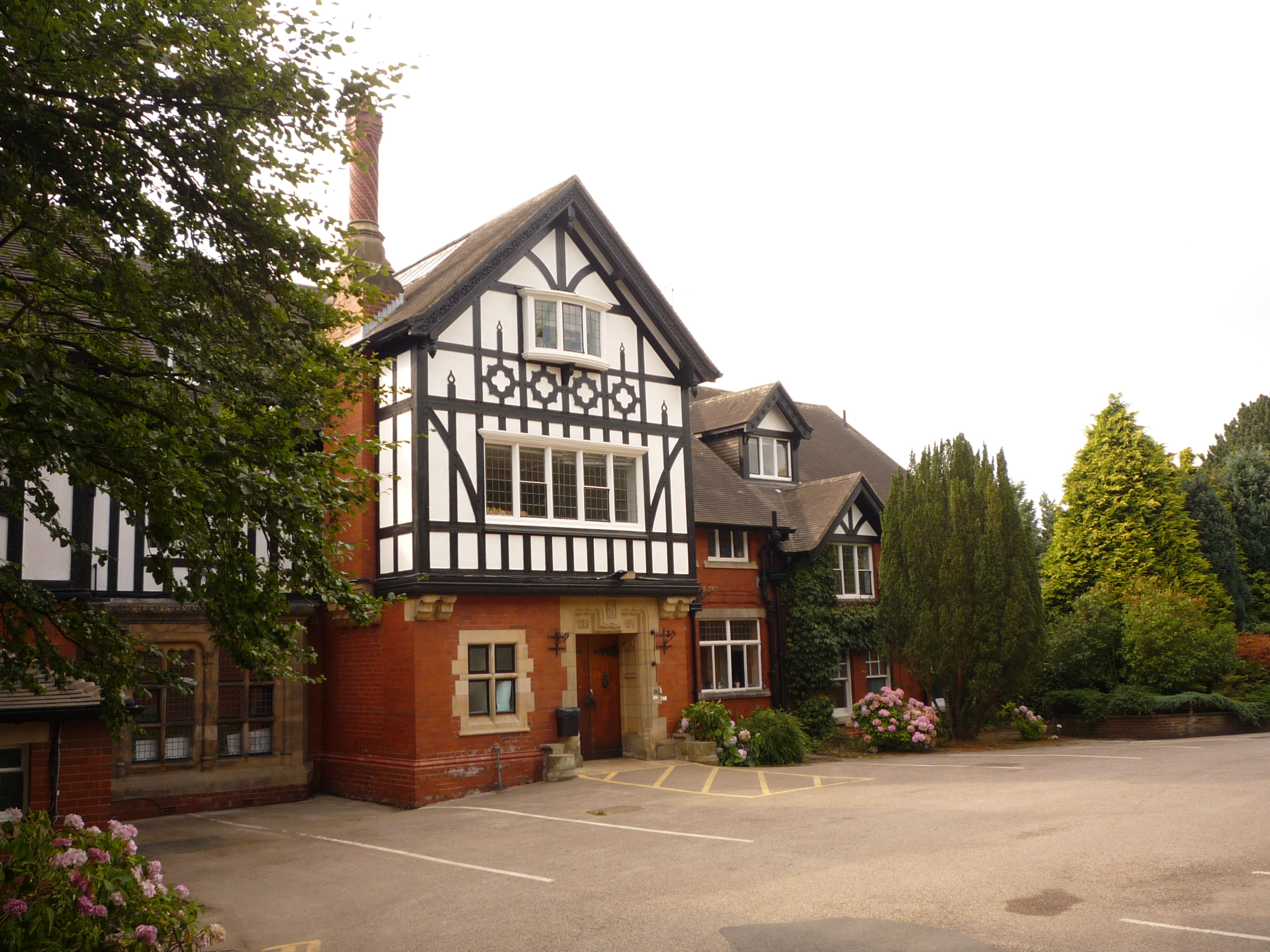
Bailrigg House

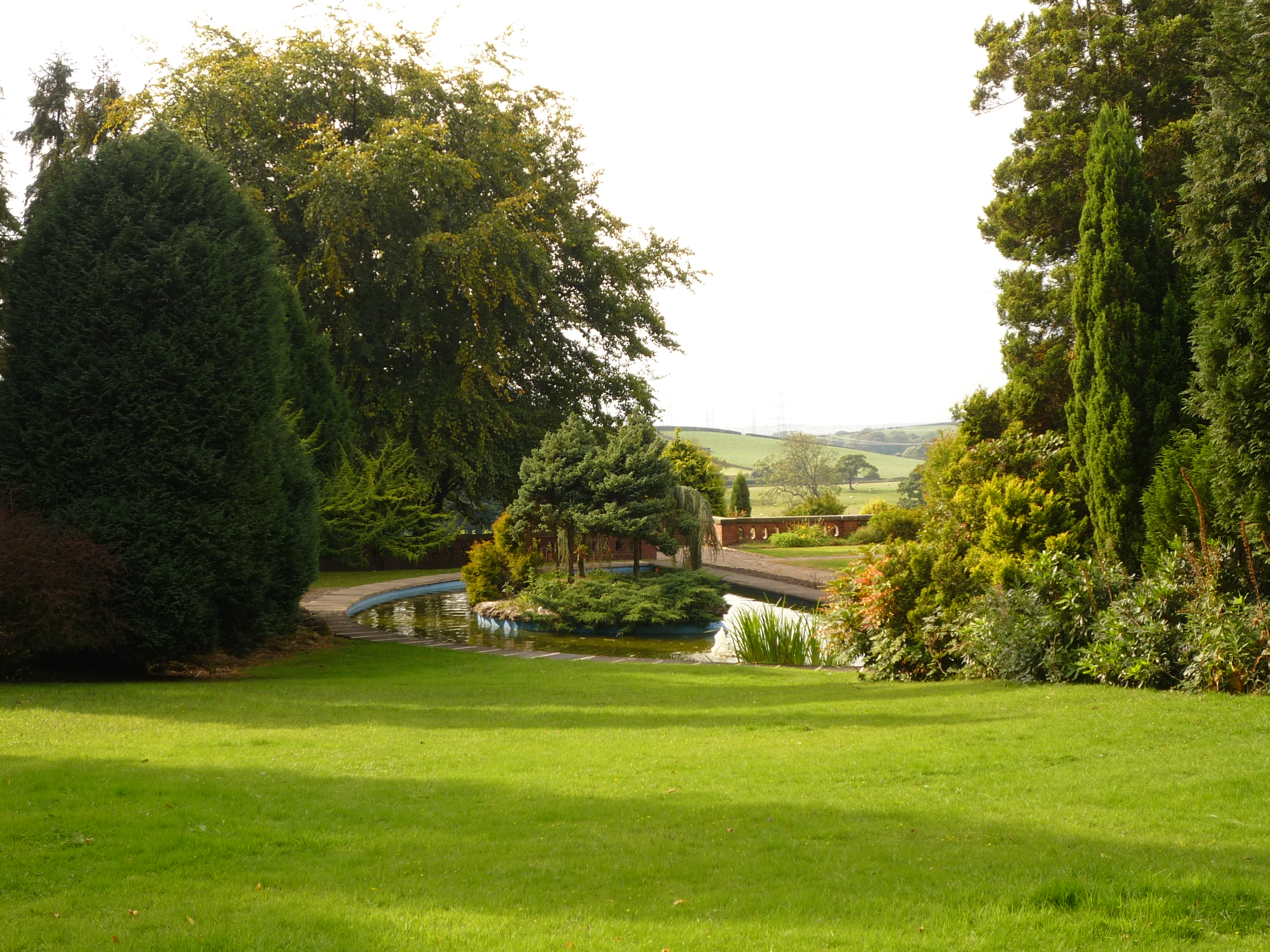
Bailrigg House Gardens

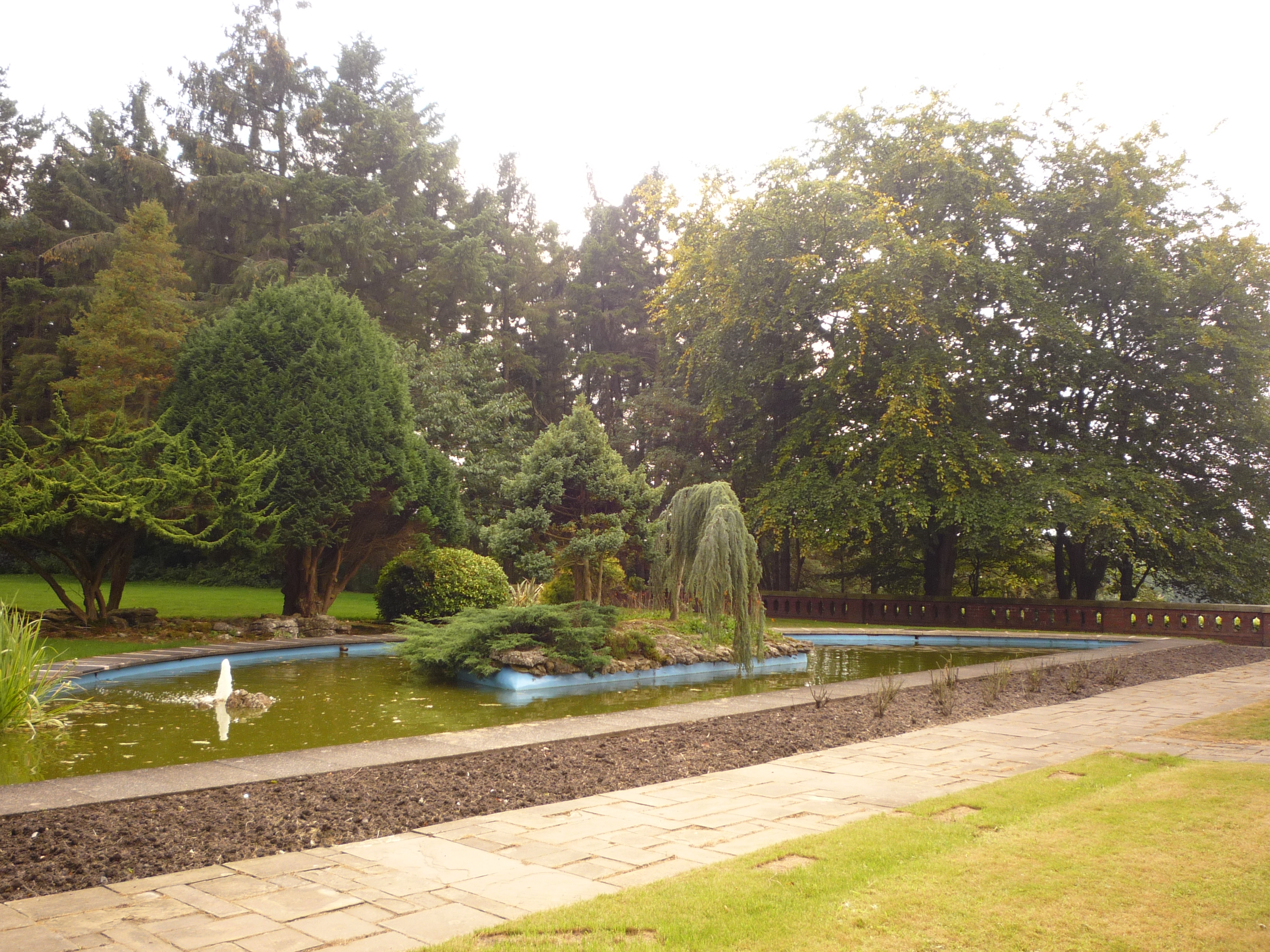
Bailrigg House Gardens
