= William Hoggatt =

British painter (1879–1961)

William Hoggatt (1 September 1879 – 4 June 1961) was a British artist based in the Isle of Man.

== Early life and education ==
Hoggatt was born on 1 September 1879 in Lancaster, UK. Instead of taking up his scholarship to the Royal College of Art, he stayed in Lancaster to continue an apprenticeship in stained glass with Shrigley and Hunt and his studies at the Storey Institute. Sponsored by H.L. Storey, he attended the Academie Julian in Paris from 1899 to 1901.

After working at the Tate Gallery in London, Hoggatt moved to the Isle of Man with Dazine Archer in 1907 where they were married at Kirk Rushen on 20 April 1907.

== Work ==
Hoggatt painted landscapes of the Isle of Man, many of which are now in the collection of Manx National Heritage with several on display at the Manx Museum. During his lifetime his works were exhibited at The Royal Academy, London.

In 1925, Hoggatt was elected to the Royal Institute of Painters in Watercolours. He was also a member of the Liverpool and Manchester Academies.

Hoggatt died at his home in Port Erin on 4 June 1961.
