= Ergon Theatre =

Climate Theatre Company

Ergon Theatre is a climate change-focused theatre company based in Manchester, UK. Their debut show The Wicked Problem premiered at Contact Theatre in November 2021 during COP26 and was a part of Julie's Bicycle's Season for Change. In 2022, Narc Magazine labelled Ergon Theatre One of the UK’s leading climate theatre companies.

Ergon Theatre was nominated and shortlisted as finalists at the 2022 Manchester Culture Awards for Promotion of Environmental Sustainability. The company have been members of the Greater Manchester Arts and Sustainability Team (GMAST) since 2020.

The Ergon Theatre company founders are Robin Lyons, Noé Sébert, Sam Black and Catt Lyons (Formerly Catt Belcher). To date, the company has worked with organisations including Contact Theatre, The Lowry, HOME (Manchester), Julie's Bicycle, RFK Human Rights, Manchester International Festival, ARC Stockton, Universities UK, M6 Theatre, Lancaster Arts, Reform Radio, NERC, Manchester Metropolitan University, Manchester Fashion Movement.

In 2025 Ergon Theatre began working with YouthNet Global and environmental Activist and performer Umme Zamilatun Naima, Miss Earth Bangladesh 2021 (funded by British Council Bangladesh) to raise awareness of the issue of Tiger Widows, climate vulnerable women in the Sundarbans, Bangladesh who are blamed for their husbands deaths after instances of human-tiger conflict that can be attributed to environmental degradation due in part to climate change.
