= Nuffield Theatre =

Nuffield Theatre may refer to:

- Nuffield Theatre (Lancaster University), England
- Nuffield Theatre (University of Southampton), England
