= Lancaster Arts at Lancaster University =

- Predecessor: The Nuffield Theatre (1968–2010), Lancaster International Concert Series (1969–2010), Peter Scott Gallery (1975–2010),
- Formation: 2010
- Type: Arts Centre
- Legal status: Non-profit
- Location: Lancaster, Lancashire
- Coordinates: 54°00′37″N 2°47′08″W
- Services: Creative industries
- Director: Jocelyn Cunningham
- Parent organization: Lancaster University
- Affiliations: Arts Council England, Peter Scott Gallery Charitable Trust, Friends of the Concerts, LICA, Lancaster Arts Partners (LAP), Live Art UK (LAUK),
- Website: www.lancasterarts.org
- Formerly called: Live at LICA (2010–15)

Lancaster Arts at Lancaster University (LA) is Lancaster University's public arts organisation. The organisation presents performances, for the public, staff and students, through its campus venues the Nuffield Theatre, Lancaster Concerts Series and the Peter Scott Gallery.

== Aims and Ethos ==
Lancaster Arts at Lancaster University serves as the university's arts provider, with its venues and events open to the general public, students and staff. It programmes a wide range of concerts, theatre, visual arts, dance and spoken word events and exhibitions via an autumn and spring programme. The Nuffield Theatre and the Peter Scott Gallery have historically brought artists to perform that align with the teaching of academic courses within the Lancaster Institute for the Contemporary Arts. Lancaster Arts serves as part of the university's 2020 Strategy to engage locally and internationally with issues and debates of the day and future.

Lancaster Arts is an Arts Council England 'National Portfolio Organisation' (NPO) and as such is committed to supporting cultural and artistic engagement through its programme of contemporary theatre, dance, visual art and music. Lancaster Arts states that its mission:

"is to support the many colours of art in the 21st Century and to foster social, cultural, educational and economic impact within this context, as an organization based in the North of England."

Lancaster Arts shares its venues and supports work with other University departments and societies. The organisation facilitates the presentation of external commercial and community based events and student groups who wish to use the Great Hall Complex and its facilities.

=== Supported artists ===
In 2015 Lancaster Arts (then Live at LICA) launched its 2015–17 Associate Artists Programme. These associates receive assistance which includes; commissions, residencies, presentations, advocacy and specialist support. Artists receive a bespoke package based on a set of mutually and collaborative projects. The three Associate Artists are currently:

- Andy Smith
- imitating the dog
- Quarantine

=== Commissions ===
Lancaster Arts has a history of commissioning new artistic work, and is supported to do this as an Arts Council England 'National Portfolio Organisation'; it has commissioned a significant amount of new work which tours nationally and internationally.

==== Theatre commissions ====
The Nuffield Theatre, Lancaster has commissioned numerous contemporary performances and plays. Examples include the 2010 outdoor performance entitled "Jack Scout" which took place in Silverdale, Lancashire. In 2014 the organisation commissioned and produced the theatrical show 'Sea Breeze' exploring the history of Morecambe Winter Gardens. The performance went on to become Alfred Hickling's (The Guardian's theatre critic) top pick for 2014.

==== Music commissions ====
The organisation also commissions new music. Examples include a work by Canadian composer, Nicole Lizée, for British Percussionist, Joby Burgess: Pioneers of Percussion, a new piece of music by Graham Fitkin for Ockham's Razor's aerial production entitled "Not Until We Are Lost" and Retorica's Live at LICA-commissioned piece by Sergei Prokofiev's great-grandson Gabriel Prokofiev in 2014.

==== Art commissions ====
In 2011 the organisation commissioned a new film and photographic work by Mel Brimfield entitled "This is Performance Art: Part Two – Experimental Theatre and Cabaret" The Exhibition was accompanied by a new book with a foreword by the then Director Matt Fenton.

In 2014, the organisation commissioned a large-format video installation by British artists Iain Forsyth and Jane Pollard entitled Jumpers (What must I do to be saved).

== History ==
Lancaster Arts as its constituent parts have existed for nearly 50 years.

=== Pre-unification ===
Prior to their merger in 2007 the Lancaster International Concert Series, Peter Scott Gallery, and Nuffield Theatre were operated separately. Historically these were overseen by academic departments as the public arts were established concurrently with the setting up of academic departments in the arts, all of which rested on a foundation of performance and practice in the relevant disciplines. The public arts provision and the departmental curricula were therefore able to support and reinforce each other.

==== Nuffield Theatre ====
The theatre opened in the 1968–69 academic year with one of the first performances being Jonson's Bartholomew Fair. The theatre was funded in part by a donation of £80,000 from the Nuffield Foundation. Professor Tom E Lawrenson, first head of department for French in 1964, played a significant role in establishing the theatre as a place of practical experimentation – Integral to the theatres original concept was its flexibility which allowed for a life-size replica of a 17th-century Parisian public theatre to be built with original specifications. The Nuffield's designed featured flexible flooring and seating, no windows and a griddled ceiling to allow for this kind of research into theatre history, as well making it perfect for contemporary experimental theatre and for training students in a range of technical skills. The project architects, Shepheard and Epstein drew on theatre designer Stephen Joseph for inspiration. At its opening the theatre was one of the largest black box theatres in the UK.

The Department of Theatre Studies grew out of the founding Department of English in 1972, and its founding head was Kenneth Parrott, who was also director of the Nuffield Theatre Studio. The Nuffield's 'public' performances began as the Nuffield Theatre Club and it developed a reputation for experimental theatre and dance. The Nuffield was granted its public performance licence in 1992.

==== Lancaster Concert Series ====
Since the opening of The Great Hall at Lancaster University in 1969, there have been regular concerts on campus. Lancaster University's international subscription series of concerts was initially directed by Sir John Manduell from 1969 to 1971 with Professor Denis McCaldin taking over as Director of Music in 1971 leading to the creation of Lancaster Concerts. Professor McCaldin also helped set up the university's new music department which was established in 1968 and appointed its first organist Ian Hare in 1974; Hare served as Organist for 35 years retiring in 2015. The inaugural concert on the Great Hall organ was in March 1979.

A copy of student newspaper SCAN from 2 December 1974 reviews a concert on the 10th anniversary of the university stating:

"Because music has played a significant part in the life of the University, and particularly because the Thursday concerts have made an important contribution to better relations between the University and the local community and have established Bailrigg as in of the leading musical centers of the North, it was appropriate to mark the University's 10th Anniversary with an orchestral Concert..."

The concert series brought international professional artists to Lancaster including; Paul Lewis and BBC Philharmonic. The vast majority of concerts were held in the Great Hall but also occasionally the Nuffield Theatre.

Professor Denis McCaldin retired as Director of Music in 2001, having overseen 1000 concerts, to fill the ceremonial position of President of Lancaster Concerts; a position previously held by Sir Arthur Bliss, Paul Tortelier and Dame Janet Baker but which no longer exists. He was replaced as head of the concert series by Tim Williams who ran the concerts until 2013, eventually becoming associate director of Live at LICA. Professor McCaldin retired as Head of Music in 2005, and in 2012 the Music Department was laid down.

==== Peter Scott Gallery ====
The Peter Scott Gallery opened in the Michaelmas term of 1975 under the name Scott Gallery on the top floor of the new Pendle College building. The gallery was funded by Peter F Scott, CBE, and the Scott family trust. The Scott Gallery was renamed the Peter Scott Gallery in 1988, when it moved up to the Great Hall complex and took over a space originally designed as an outdoor performance area that formed part of the Jack Hylton Music Rooms. It was refurbished and enlarged in 1993. The Irene Manton Room is on the ground floor and above it is a room dedicated to the John Chamberlain Collection.

=== Public Arts ===
Over time the Concerts, Gallery, and Theatre became more distinct from their related departmental areas and with the merger of theatre, art and music into the Lancaster Institute for the Contemporary Arts in 2005 the decision was made in 2007 to merge the Concert, Gallery and Theatre into a single organisation overseen by one director. This merger was termed The Public Arts with Matt Fenton, former director of the Nuffield, overseeing this unification which was completed in 2009. Public Arts was not used explicitly as a brand although it was referenced in A University in its region – building the economy, enriching lives which was a brochure published by the university in 2009. Printed material was produced under Public Arts but under the header 'Peter Scott Gallery, Lancaster Nuffield Theatre, Lancaster International Concert Series'. In October 2010 the administrative amalgamation became public under the name Live at LICA (Lancaster Institute for the Contemporary Arts) which would refer to all three organisations.

=== Live at LICA ===
Live at LICA launched in 2010 with Matt Fenton, former director of the Nuffield as director, and Tim Williams, former director of the concerts as associate director. Live at LICA developed a reputation for supporting emerging contemporary work across the fields of Visual arts, Performance art and Art music. The merger of the three organisations allowed for more interdisciplinary work and the Peter Scott Gallery at this time shifted its focus towards more Contemporary art, talks and Performance art. Live at LICA continued to work closely with Lancaster Institute for the Contemporary Arts to supplement the academic courses with artist talks, performances for students and partnerships.

Tim Williams continued to oversee the concert series until his departure in 2013 where he was succeed as associate director by Fiona Sinclair, formerly of Lancashire Sinfonietta, who continued the tradition of managing the concerts. In 2013 Jamie Eastman, previously Curator of Performance at Arnolfini, replaced Matt Fenton as Live at LICA's second director.

=== Lancaster Arts at Lancaster University ===
In August 2015 Live at LICA was rebranded to 'Lancaster Arts at Lancaster University' to avoid confusion with the department of LICA, then director Jamie Eastman stated that:

"This new name and logo communicates who we are, where we are and what we’re offering."

== Venues ==
=== Great Hall Complex ===
The university used proceeds from its first Appeal (1964–71) to fund the public arts. These were centred on the Great Hall complex, which was designed to include the Great and Minor Halls, the Jack Hylton Music Rooms, the Nuffield Theatre Studio and adjoining workshop, and the Fine Arts Studios.

==== The Great Hall ====
The Great Hall is a flexible flat-floored space designed for good acoustics. It contains a small Harrison & Harrison pipe organ, completed in 1979, and is the location for the Lancaster International Concert Series, which commenced in 1969. It was also the place where the renowned popular concerts were staged in the 1980s, these were organised by Barry Lucas working with the JCR (Junior Common Room).

==== The Jack Hylton Rooms ====
The Jack Hylton Music Rooms, a purpose-built theatre production workshop, rehearsal spaces, and a Life Drawing Studio. The Jack Hylton Music Rooms were named after the entertainer Jack Hylton. A special memorial concert was held by Hylton's son, Jack Hylton Junior, entitled "The Stars Shine for Jack". The proceeds were donated towards the building of the new Music Department at Lancaster University in his honour. When it was opened in 1965, it was hoped that the rooms would make Lancaster into the music centre of the North West.

==== The Nuffield Theatre ====
The Nuffield theatre opened in the 1968–69 academic year. Shepheard and Epstein were the project architects, and they drew on the expertise of the well-known theatre designer, Stephen Joseph, for the Nuffield Theatre Studio before his untimely death. The Nuffield Theatre is one of three theatre's in Lancaster and is the professional 'black-box' studio theatre. One notable feature about the stage is that it be configurated up to a width of 25 metres or with seating up to 220.

=== The Peter Scott Gallery ===
Immediately to the south of the Great Hall is the Peter Scott Gallery, The gallery was funded by Peter F Scott, CBE, and the Scott family trust, and originally located in Pendle College under the name Scott Gallery. It was refurbished and enlarged in 1993 and features The Irene Manton Room on the ground floor and above it is a room dedicated to the John Chambers Collection of Royal Lancastrian Pilkington's Ceramics.

=== The LICA Building ===
The Lancaster Institute for the Contemporary Arts building is a timber-framed building, offering a range of flexible performance and workshop spaces to support teaching and research in Art, Design, Film Studies, Music and Theatre Studies. It was the first UK higher education project to be awarded a BREEAM outstanding rating.

=== The Storey ===
In 2016 Lancaster Arts at Lancaster University held a number of events in The Storey loosely under the brand of Lancaster Arts at the Storey. This included convention titled 'The Storey: 21st Century Art Centre?' which was presented by Lancaster Arts in partnership with Creative Exchange. The Storey was the hub for the Festival of Questions hosting numerous exhibitions, performances and the Day of Questions One and Two.

== Notable works ==
=== Performers ===
Notable theatre and dance organisions who have performed at Lancaster Arts:

- Forced Entertainment 1994 Hidden J, 1995 Speak Bitterness, 1998 Dirty Work, 1999 Disco Relax, 2002 The Travels, 2005 Exquisite Pain, 2008 Spectacular, 2011 Tomorrow's Parties, 2012 The Coming Storm, 2016 The Notebook – Part of Festival of Questions
- Nigel Charnock 1995 Hell Bent
- Akrim Khan 2002 Kaash
- The Cholmondeleys 1997 Flesh & Blood
- John Hegley 1999 Out of Luton, 2002 The Sketch Books
- Hofesh Shechter 2007 deGENERATION: Cult, Fragments & Uprising
- Gob Squad 2008 Kitchen, 2014 Western Society, 2017 We Are Gob Squad & So Are You, 2017 War and Peace
- Carol Ann Duffy 2010 in partnership with Lancaster Litfest
- The Featherstonehaughs 2011 Edits & Draw on the Sketchbooks of Egon Sheiele
- Candoco 2009 Still and The Perfect Human, 2011 Renditions, 2013 Artist's Summer Lab, 2013 Turning 20, 2014 Playing Another
- Phoenix Dance Theatre 2015 Mixed Programme 2015
- Goat Island (performance group) 2005 When will the September roses bloom? Last night was only a comedy, 2006 Goat Island Summer Workshop, 2008, The Lastmaker,

Lancaster Arts has a strong relationship with Ockham's Razor Theatre Company. The Nuffield hosted their show The Arc in 2008, The Mill was performed in the Great Hall in 2010 and in November 2011 Not Until We Are Lost was performed at Lancaster Castle and the LICA building – this showing was in partnership with Lancaster Castle and the Lancaster Light Up Lancaster festival. The music for Not Until We Are Lost was commissioned by Lancaster Arts and they hosted an Ockham's Razor Summer School 2011 in the Nuffield.

=== Musicians ===
A huge range of musicians have performed in The Great Hall and Nuffield Theatre

==== Concert series ====
Lancaster International Concert Series is the main provider of classical music in north Lancashire and Cumbria. Notable performers include:

- Manchester Camerata 1998, 2008
- Jean-Guihen Queyras 1998, 1999
- Lindsay String Quartet 1999
- Malcolm Martineau 1999
- BBC Philharmonic 1999, 2007, 2011
- Noriko Ogawa 2003
- Hungarian National Philharmonic 2003
- Psappha New Music Ensemble 2005
- Polish National Radio Symphony Orchestra 2007
- Sinfonia ViVA 2008
- Gabriela Montero 2013, 2015 with Manchester Camerata

Martin Roscoe was musician-in-residence 1999 to 2000.

==== Gigs ====
From 1971 and 1984 the Great Hall, and the Nuffield Theatre, hosted a number of music gigs. Many of these were organised by Barry Lucas working with the JCR (Junior Common Room). Acts included:

- Joy Division 19 June 1979: Nuffield Theatre with John Cooper-Clarke
- Pink Floyd
- Black Sabbath
- Ozzy Osbourne
- Bob Marley
- Tina Turner
- Madness
- Status Quo
- T Rex
- Slade
- The Smiths
- Elvis Costello
- The Who
- Paul McCartney
- The Undertones

Lancaster Arts made efforts to revive this with their 2015 Music Week where they turned the Nuffield into a music venue featuring Hope & Social and Beardyman.

=== Collections ===
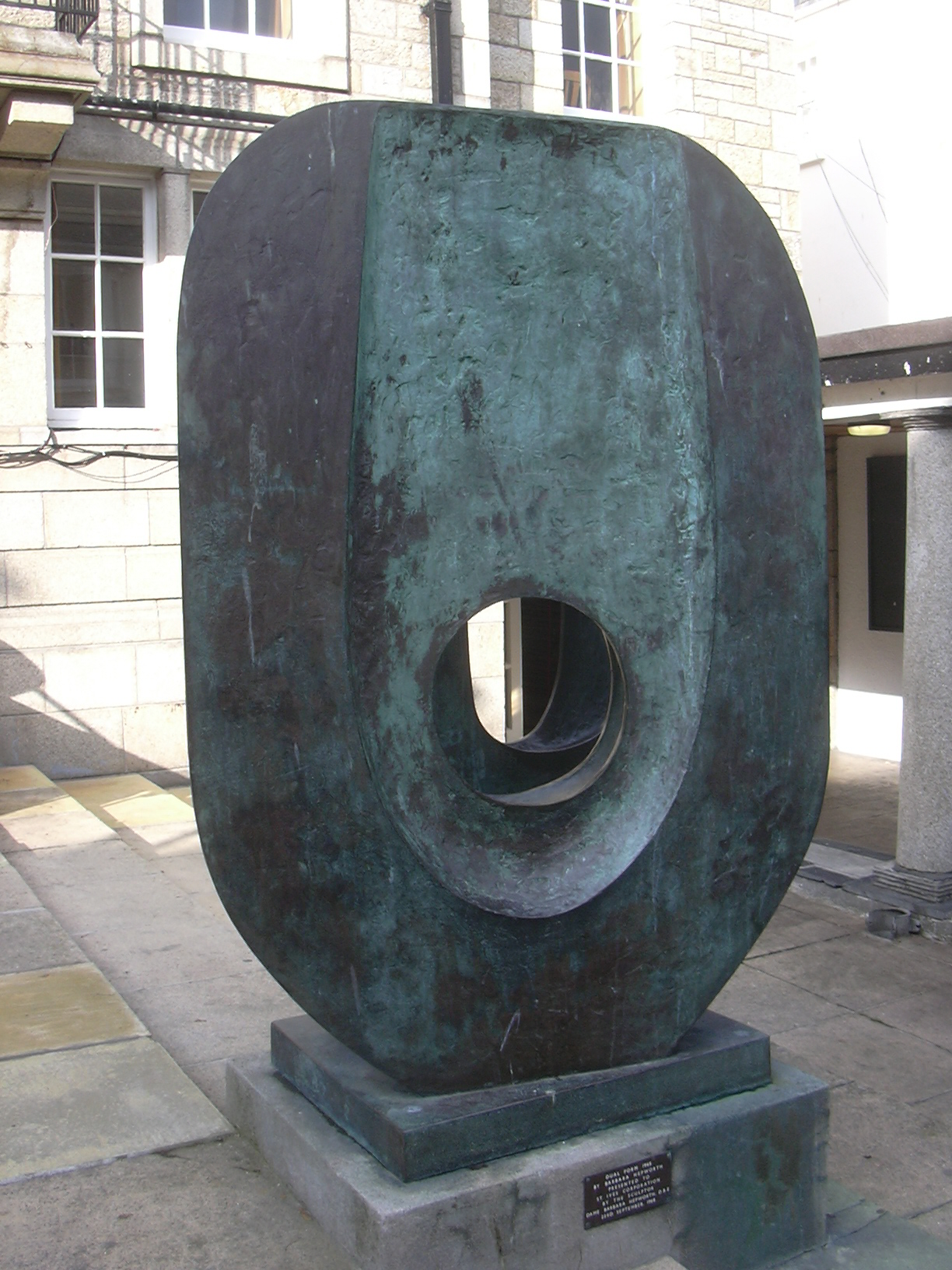
Barbara Hepworth's Dual Form, bronze, 1965, of which one is on permanent display at the University of Lancaster as part of the Peter Scott Gallery Collections

The Peter Scott Gallery holds significant collections of art and antique objects including a significant collection of Chinese and Japanese Art, as well as a collection of 20th-century art which includes work by artists from the St Ives School, Sir Terry Frost, Wilhelmina Barns-Graham, Barbara Hepworth and William Scott. Among other British artists whose work is represented are Norman Adams, Patrick Caulfield, Elisabeth Frink, Kenneth Martin and Winifred Nicholson. Recent acquisitions have included works by Andy Goldsworthy, Peter Howson and Albert Irvin. The university collection also includes prints by significant European artists such as Dürer, Miró, Ernst, Mondrian and Vasarely, and the Lancaster University Special Collections holds a collection of artists books and an archive of pop-up books.

The collection also includes a number of antiquities, many of which are on permanent display in the John Chambers Ceramics Room of The Peter Scott Gallery. The collection includes Roman, Greek and Egyptian vessels in ceramic and glass. Examples of items from the collection include a Roman stylus, an Egyptian papyrus fragment from a Book of the Dead. The Peter Scott Gallery also houses one of the most significant collections of Pilkington's Tile and Pottery Company in the UK.

=== Exhibitions ===
In 2011 Franko B exhibited Someone to Love in the Peter Scott Gallery including commissioned work. In 2013 Iain Forsyth and Jane Pollard exhibited the newly commissioned Jumpers (what must I do to be saved). Wu Chi-Tsung was presented in the gallery and at The Storey as part of the national Recalibrate programme in 2014 the world included Crystal City, cyanotypes from the Wrinkled Textures series and several examples of still life video works. Other notable exhibitions that premiered new work were by Mel Brimfield in 2012 (This is Performance Art – Part Two: Experimental Theatre and Cabaret)and 2014 (Testing Media: Mel Brimfield); and Paul Mcdevitt in 2015 (Hunker Down).

=== Festivals ===
==== Curate the Campus ====
Due to exams and limited space, the public programme reduced in summer term and became Curate the Campus by 2012 an initiative to distribute art throughout campus. Curate the Campus ran in 2012 and 2013 before being refined and becoming OPEN.

==== OPEN ====
OPEN is a yearly festival in which the Peter Scott Gallery becomes a social space open throughout the day. Open has traditionally been centred around a theme, 2016 being Environment|Education. OPEN is a public space for trying new things and talking about ideas across artforms.

==== Festival of Questions ====
In 2016 Lancaster Arts launched the Festival of Questions an event designed to explore how art can engage with politics. The festival included artistic exhibitions from Sarah Vanhee and Tania El Khoury, performances from Season Butler and Proto-type theater, a lecture at The Dukes by Owen Jones and a performance of Shostakovich's Violin Concerto No 1 by Chetham's Symphony Orchestra. The festival culminated in two 'days of questions' in which panels of artists, academics, and commentators discussed 'pressing questions of the day' speakers included: David Kynaston, Melissa Benn, Colin Grant, David Goodhart, Dr Simon Mabon, Cat Smith MP, Professor John Urry and Caroline Criado Perez.

== Directors ==
- Director: Jocelyn Cunningham (2016–Present)
- Interim Director: Fiona Sinclair & Richard Smith (2016)
- Director: Jamie Eastman (2013–16)
- Interim Director: Richard Smith (Curator of Peter Scott Gallery) (2013)
- Director: Matt Fenton (2010–13)
- Director (Nuffield Theatre): Matt Fenton (2003–10)
- Director (Lancaster International Concert Series): Tim Williams (2001–13)
- Director (Nuffield Theatre): Adrian Harris (1995–2003)
- Director (Nuffield Theatre): Baz Kershaw (1985–95)
- Director (Nuffield Theatre): Kenneth Parrott (1972–85)
- Director/Professor of Music (Lancaster Concerts): Denis McCaldin (1971–2001)
- Director (Lancaster Concerts): Sir John Manduell (1969–71)
