= Lancaster railway station (1840–1849) =

Former railway station in England

Lancaster
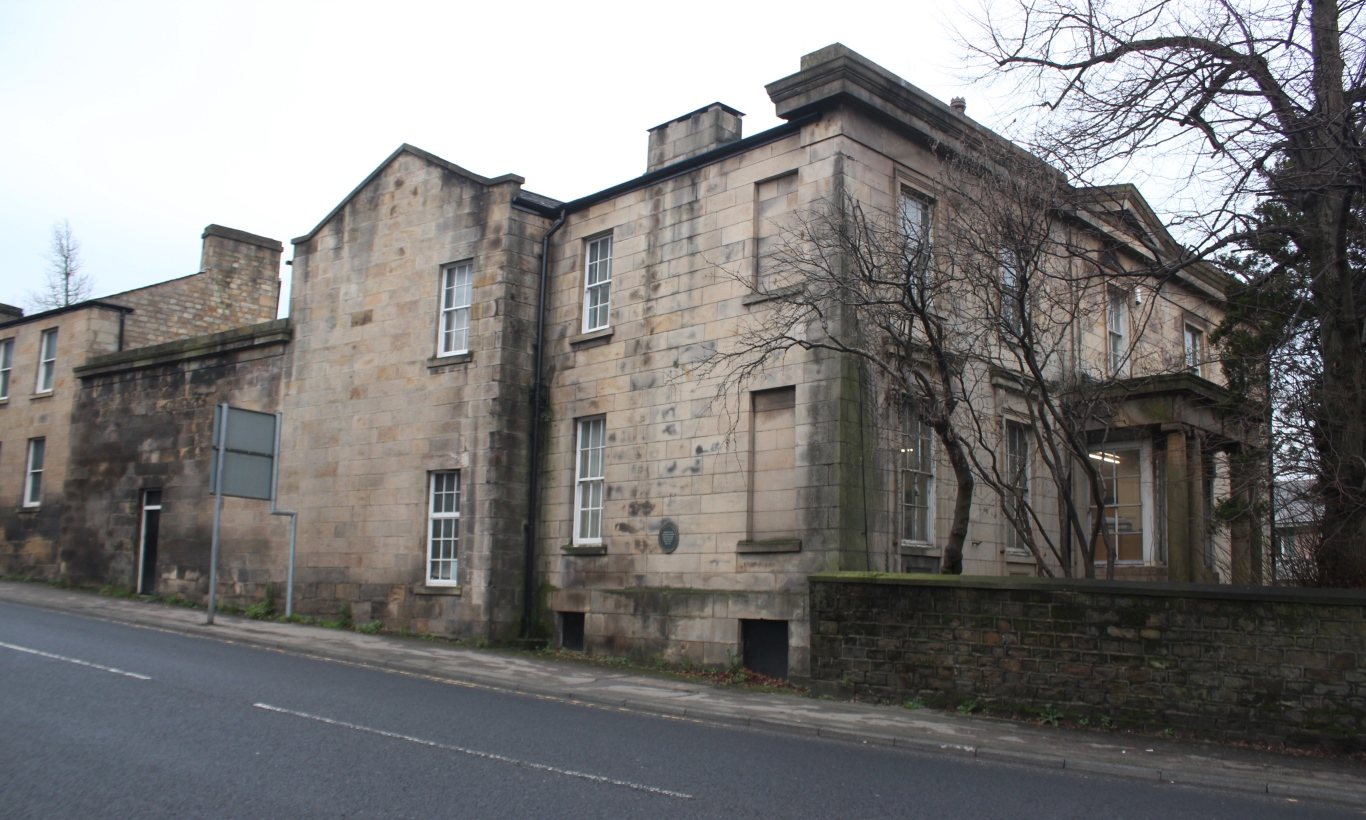
- The station remains in 2019

General information
- Location: Lancaster, City of Lancaster; England
- Coordinates: 54.0433°N 2.7982°W
- Grid reference: SD 47818 61132

Other information
- Status: Disused

History
- Original company: Lancaster and Preston Junction Railway

Key dates
- 26 June 1840: Opened
- 1 August 1849: Closed to passengers
- ?: closed for goods
Location
- Location within Lancaster Location within the City of Lancaster district Location within Lancashire

The first Lancaster railway station was the northern terminus of the Lancaster and Preston Junction Railway, located in the Greaves area of the city of Lancaster, Lancashire, England. It was open from 1840 to 1849, by which time it had been superseded by Lancaster Castle railway station. Some books refer to the station as "Lancaster (Greaves)" or "Lancaster (Penny Street)" to distinguish it from later stations in the city, although whilst open it was known simply as "Lancaster" as there was no other station of that name at the same time.

== History ==
Lancaster station opened on 26 June 1840, along with the Lancaster and Preston Junction Railway (L&PJR) between Preston and Lancaster. The building, which also served as the railway company's headquarters, was designed by Edwin Gwyther of Birmingham. It was located near the modern-day junction between South Road and Ashton Road, just south of the Lancaster Canal and the southern end of Penny Street.

The Lancaster and Carlisle Railway (L&CR) opened its own Lancaster Castle railway station on 22 September 1846. Its line joined the L&PJR line a short distance south of Lancaster. On 1 August 1849, the L&CR leased the L&PJR line, on which date Lancaster station was closed to passengers.

Most of the spur line leading towards the station continued to be used to access a goods station until the mid-20th century. The station building survives today as a nurses' home for the Royal Lancaster Infirmary, and is a Grade II listed building.

A section of the platform still remains visible today, the track bed is now a car park for the hospital.

Preceding station	Disused railways	Following station
Terminus	Lancaster and Preston Junction Railway	Galgate
