= Sheppard Robson =

British architecture firm

Sheppard Robson, Architects
- Industry: Architecture, design, interior design, masterplanning
- Founded: London (1938)
- Founder: Sir Richard Herbert Sheppard; Jean Shufflebottom
- Headquarters: Camden Town, London, UK
- Number of locations: Manchester; Glasgow
- Key people: Neal Allen-Burt; David Ardill; Lee Bennett; Helen Berresford; Dan Burr; James Dick; Nick Ffoulkes; Andrew German; Rupert Goddard; Claire Haywood; Mark Kowal; James Jones; Robert Myers; Tony O’Brien; Eugene Sayers; Alan Shingler; Alex Solk; David Taylor; Jamie Wood
- Website: www.sheppardrobson.com

Sheppard Robson (previously Richard Sheppard, Robson & Partners) is a British architecture firm, founded in 1938 by Sir Richard Herbert Sheppard, with offices in London, Manchester, and Glasgow. It was particularly influential in the 1950s–1960s, pioneering the use of concrete shell structures, and in the present day as a leader in sustainable architecture, building the UK's first net zero carbon house in 2007 as well as designing the LEED Platinum Siemens Middle East Headquarters at Masdar City, which completed in 2014. The latter project was cited as exemplifying "a new generation [that] has emerged [at the practice], which is balancing performance, especially of the sustainable variety, with form". In the 2000s, the practice established an award-winning interior design group, ID:SR Sheppard Robson.

== History ==
Sheppard Robson was founded in 1938 by Richard Sheppard, a technically skilled designer with a talent for developing new materials, who was disabled as a teenager by polio, and Jean Shufflebottom, his wife, a gifted architect in her own right. The company's first big success was the Jicwood Bungalow in 1944, which used materials from aircraft manufacture.

By 1950, the company had built a reputation for large modern projects, and Sheppard had a new business partner, Geoffrey Robson, who added his name to the practice. At first they specialised in schools, building more than 80 in the 1950s. In 1958, the practice won a competition to design a science college and memorial to Winston Churchill – Churchill College, Cambridge. Later they branched out into other public buildings, and by the 1970s had built a strong reputation in commercial, university and retail buildings.

In the 1990s and 2000s, the firm entered a period of growth with often large-scale buildings such as The Helicon, Toyota/Lexus HQ, MediaCityUK, the Lighthouse, Barking Riverside and Siemens HQ Middle East. Many of these were important landmarks in the development of sustainable architecture. For instance, the Lighthouse was the UK's first net zero carbon house, the Helicon was an early sustainable office/retail building, and MediaCityUK was built as a sustainable community, verified by international sustainability regulator BREEAM (the first corporate building to achieve this).

The firm's recently completed and ongoing projects include the transformation of an urban block in London's Fitzrovia (Fitzroy Place), the completion of a new science building at the University of Hertfordshire, and the creation of new residential-led neighbourhoods of 1,500 homes at Queen Elizabeth Olympic Park (East Wick and Sweetwater).

== Sustainability ==
The Lighthouse, Britain's first zero-carbon house

Sheppard Robson is known for sustainable architecture, which it helped to pioneer in the early 1990s with buildings like the Helicon and the Lighthouse, which was the UK's first net zero-carbon house. The Lancaster Institute for the Contemporary Arts, completed in 2010, was the first college or university to win a BREEAM Outstanding rating for sustainability. The Helicon was an early sustainable office/shop building, and MediaCityUK was built as a sustainable community, verified by the international sustainability regulator BREEAM (the first corporate building to achieve this).

== Company ==
Sheppard Robson has three offices in London, Manchester and Glasgow, and about 350 employees, mostly architects. Sheppard Robson Architects LLP, trading as Sheppard Robson, became a Limited Liability Partnership in 2014, also incorporating Sheppard Robson Limited and Sheppard Robson International as limited companies. At the moment, Sheppard Robson is the fourth biggest architectural practice in the UK. Sheppard Robson has an interior design group, ID:SR, the largest integrated interior design group within a UK architecture practice, which has produced work for BBC North, Channel 4 and London Borough of Newham. Although Sheppard Robson is best known for its modern looking high-impact buildings, the company headquarters is a refurbished piano factory hidden in a courtyard in Camden Town, London.

== Major projects ==
Schools and universities

- Churchill College, Cambridge
- Loughborough University
- Brunel University
- City University
- Manchester Polytechnic
- Waingels College
- Stockwell Park High School
- London Business School
- Lancaster Institute for Contemporary Arts (LICA)

Arts and media

- BBC Broadcasting House
- MediaCityUK
- Tate Modern (executive architects)
- Campus West

Offices

- Salvation Army HQ
- Toyota HQ
- The Helicon
- Motorola HQ
- Siemens HQ Middle East
- Royal Mint Court
- One Fitzroy Place
- 245 Hammersmith Road
- Barts Square
- Interserve UK Hub

Retail

- Armani at 1 the Avenue
- The Helicon
- 1 Hanover Street (Apple's flagship in Europe)
- Tesco-Love Lane development, Woolwich

Science and healthcare

- Glaxo
- Merck Sharp and Dohme
- Nelson Mandela Children's Hospital
- Scottish Centre for Regenerative Medicine (SCRM)
- New Science Building, University of Hertfordshire
- Life Sciences Building, University of Bristol

Residential

- The Lighthouse
- Barking Riverside
- East Wick & Sweetwater
- Fitzroy Place
- 79 Camden Road
- 103–109 Wardour Street

International

- Nelson Mandela Children's’ Hospital
- Minna Airport City
- Siemens HQ Middle East

Interiors

- London Borough of Newham
- Channel 4 Headquarters
- BBC North at MediaCity
- Commonwealth Bank of Australia
- KPMG Leeds
- Arcadia Group Headquarters
