= Bartlett Park =

Park in Poplar, London, England

Coordinates: 51°30′53″N 0°1′20″W

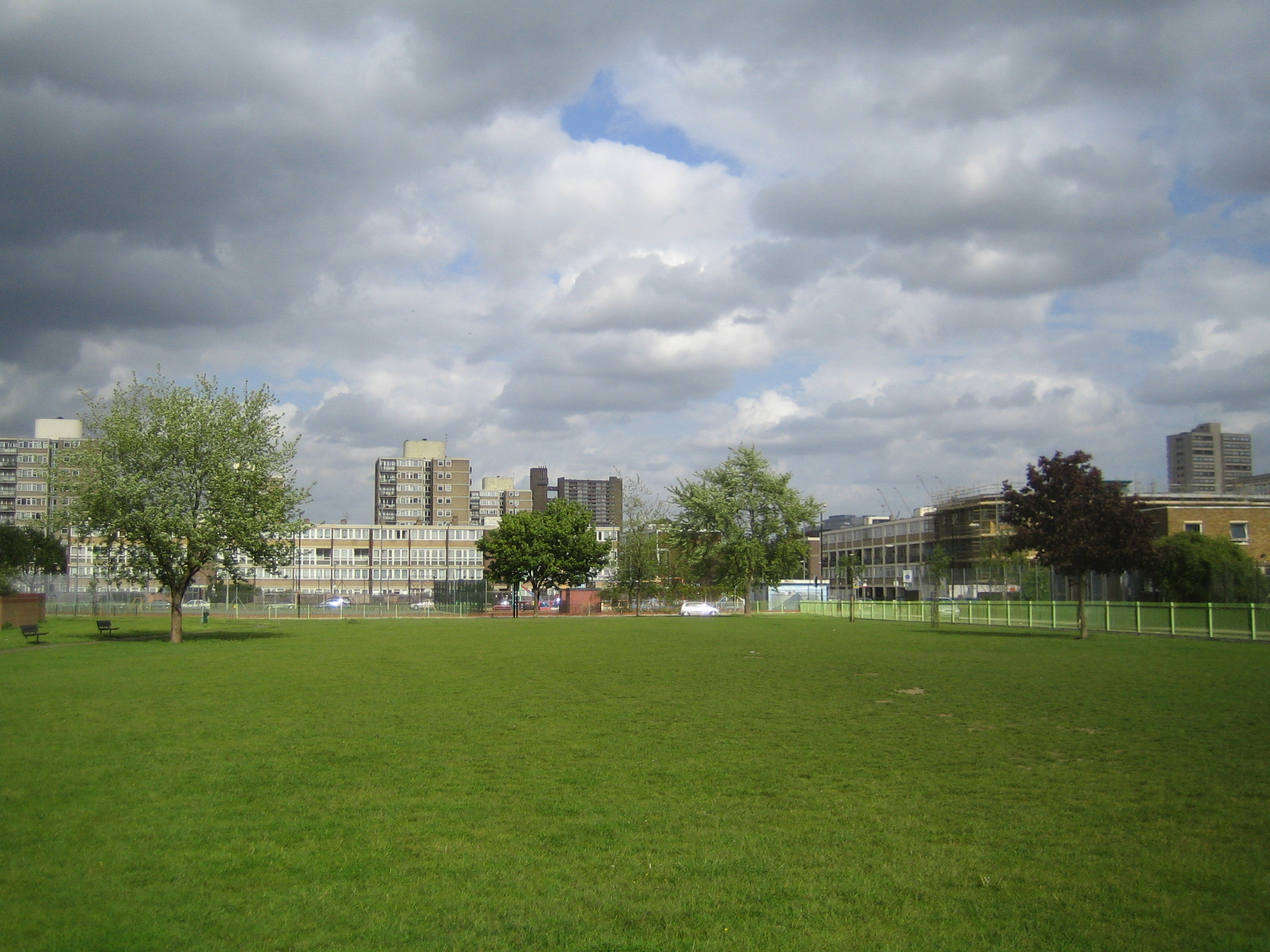
View eastward with Lindfield Street on the right, May 2007

Bartlett Park is a public open space in Poplar in the London Borough of Tower Hamlets. It is located on Upper North Street to the south of the Limehouse Cut waterway and the Lansbury Estate to the south and east of the park. The whole landscape is 4.95 hectares (12.2 acres).

== History ==
St Saviour's Church remains in the centre of park, surrounded by a single row of self-build housing. The park is named in honour of Prebendary Philip M. Bartlett, who died in 1958 and had been vicar of the Church for 39 years. St. Saviour's was almost destroyed by fire on 25 May 2007, but the shell remains since it is a Grade II listed building.

The park is host to a football club called Senrab F.C. who train here.

Tower Hamlets Council undertook a public consultation on regeneration of the park in May–June 2012. The masterplan includes improved connections to the Limehouse Cut.

== Transport ==
The London Buses route 309 passes the park.
