= Penny Street =

Street in Lancaster, England

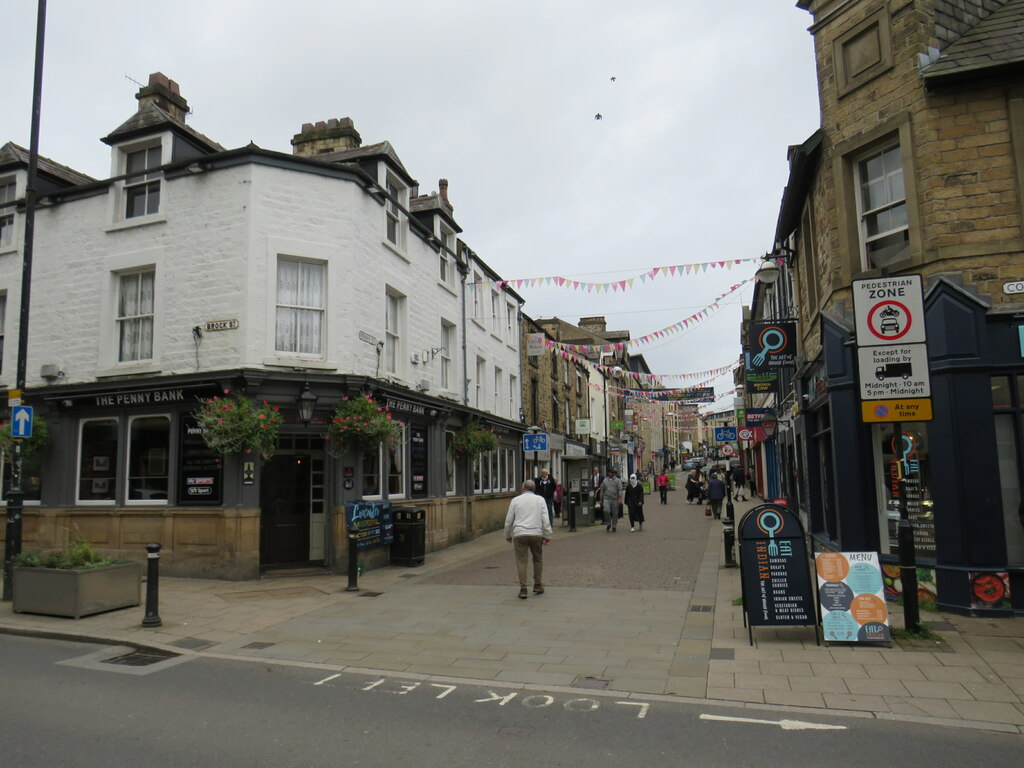
- A 2021 view, looking north from the junction with Brock Street and Common Garden Street
- Interactive map of Penny Street
- Length: 0.29 mi (0.47 km)
- Location: Lancaster, Lancashire, England
- North end: Market Street and Cheapside
- South end: South Road

Construction
- Completion: 13th century

Penny Street is a street in the city of Lancaster, England. Established in at least the 13th century, it runs for about 0.29 miles (0.47 km), from its junction with Market Street and Cheapside in the north to South Road (part of the A6), at Penny Street Bridge, in the south. Penny Street Bridge was opened in 1900.

The street is pedestrianised for around two-thirds of its course, north of Spring Garden Street and George Street.

Ffrances Passage links Penny Street and Gage Street.

== History ==
Roman burials have been found at the southern end of Penny Street, which is believed to have been the southern end of the settlement.

In 1904, an arch was erected on Penny Street, at King Street, to celebrate the shrievalty of Herbert Lushington Storey.

What was once the 1840-built Penny Street railway station became a nurses' home. The station was the terminus of the Lancaster and Preston Junction Railway prior to the opening of today's Lancaster railway station in 1846.

== Notable buildings ==
The Church of St Thomas, in the southern section of the street, was built around 1840. It was designed by Edmund Sharpe. Gillison's hospital formerly stood at the corner of Penny Street and Common Garden Street between 1792 and the 1960s, when it was demolished.

14 Penny Street dates to around 1785 and is now Grade II listed.

The Brown Cow public house, at 42 and 44 Penny Street, is Grade II listed. It dates to the late 18th century.
