= Gabriel Epstein =

British architect and urban planner

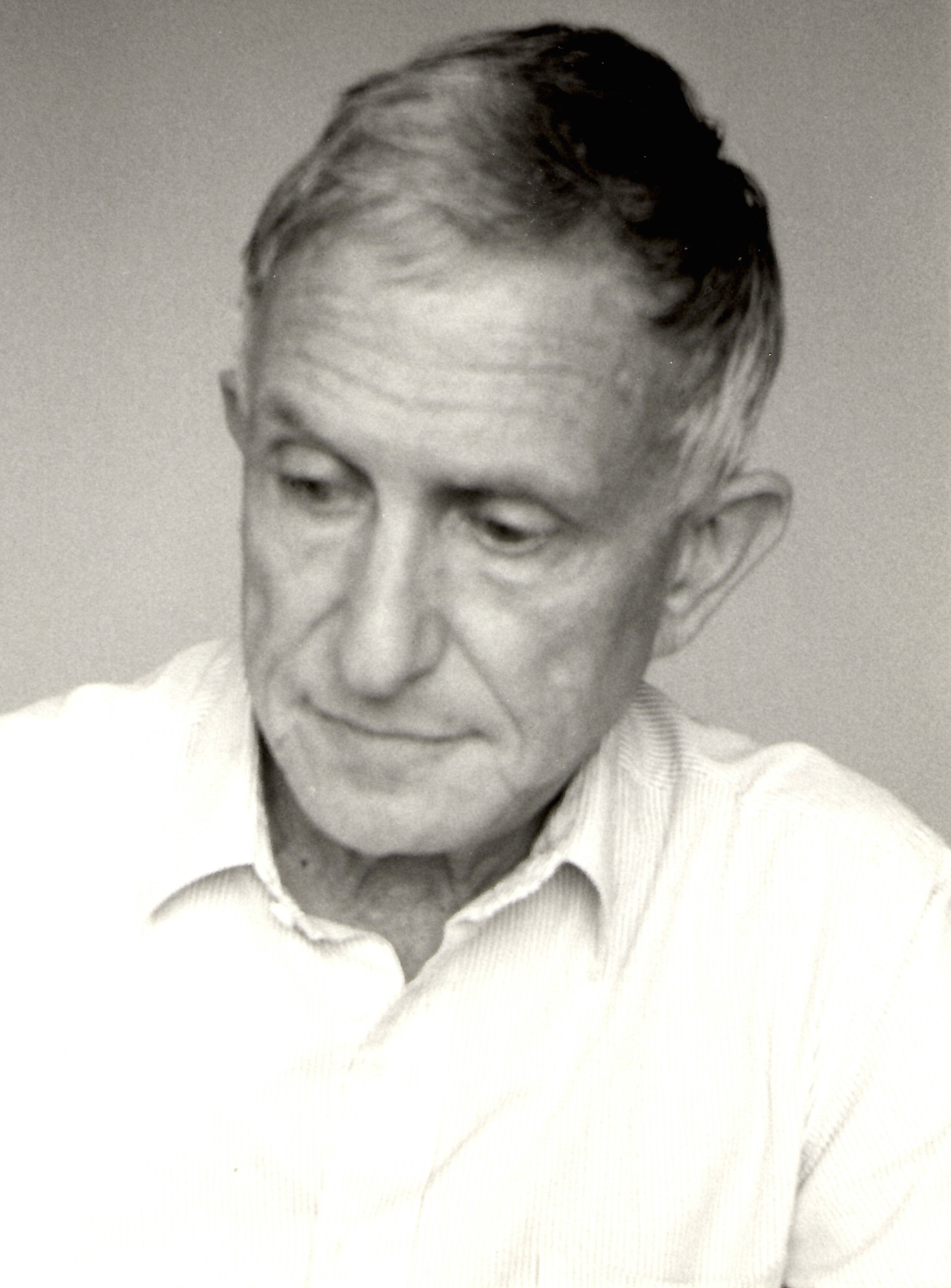
Gabriel Epstein in the 1980s

Gabriel Epstein (25 October 1918 in Duisburg, Germany – 25 July 2017 in Paris), often known as Gabi Epstein, was a British architect and urban planner, particularly noted for his master plan of the University of Lancaster, as well as several other major development plans and social housing plans.

== Early life ==
Gabriel Epstein was born on 25 October 1918 in Duisburg (Germany), an industrial city in the lower Rhine, a region where his ancestors lived for centuries. Epstein's father Harry was an influential attorney, and was strongly committed to Zionism. In the mid-1930s the family fled Nazi Germany. After a brief stay in Brussels (Belgium), Gabriel Epstein left for British Mandatory Palestine. Beginning in 1937 Epstein became an apprentice to Erich Mendelsohn in Jerusalem. As a child, in 1925–1927, he had seen Mendelsohn sketch the extension of the family department store in Duisburg, Cohen & Epstein. Later, Epstein came to admire Mendelsohn's creativeness and energy even though he never considered himself a true disciple.

In 1938 Epstein left for London to study at the Architectural Association School of Architecture. When World War II broke out, Epstein happened to be in Jerusalem, and for several months he worked for Heinz Heinrich Rau, whom he always thought of as his master. In 1942, he joined the Palestine Regiment and was later commissioned in the Royal Engineers and stationed in North Africa. Epstein was demobilised in 1946, and returned to the United Kingdom where he graduated with honours at the Architectural Association School of Architecture in 1949.

Initially German, Epstein then held a Mandatory Palestine passport, and was stateless in 1948 until he became a British citizen in the early 1950s.

== Architectural design and teaching ==
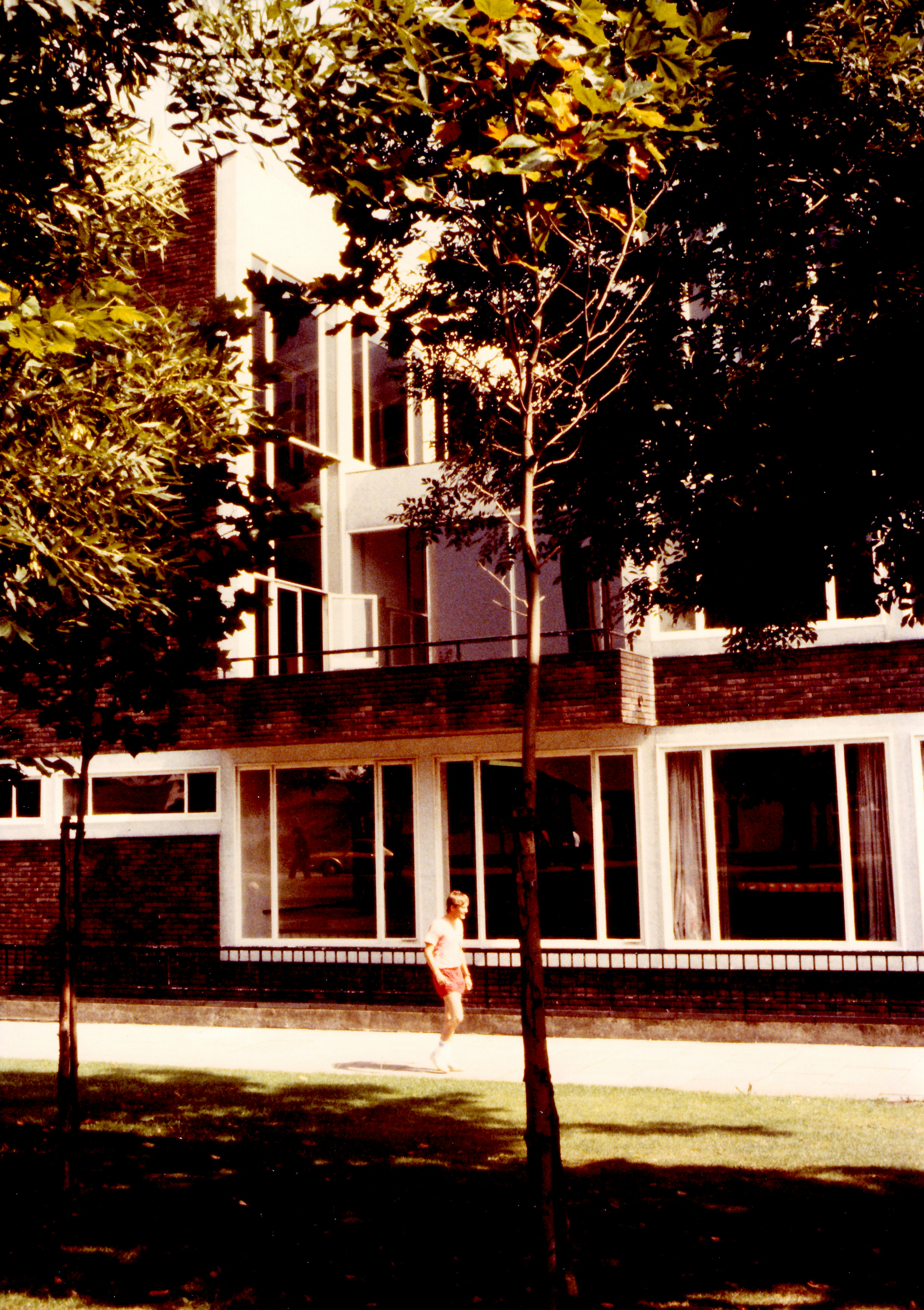
Liverpool Students Union (1964)

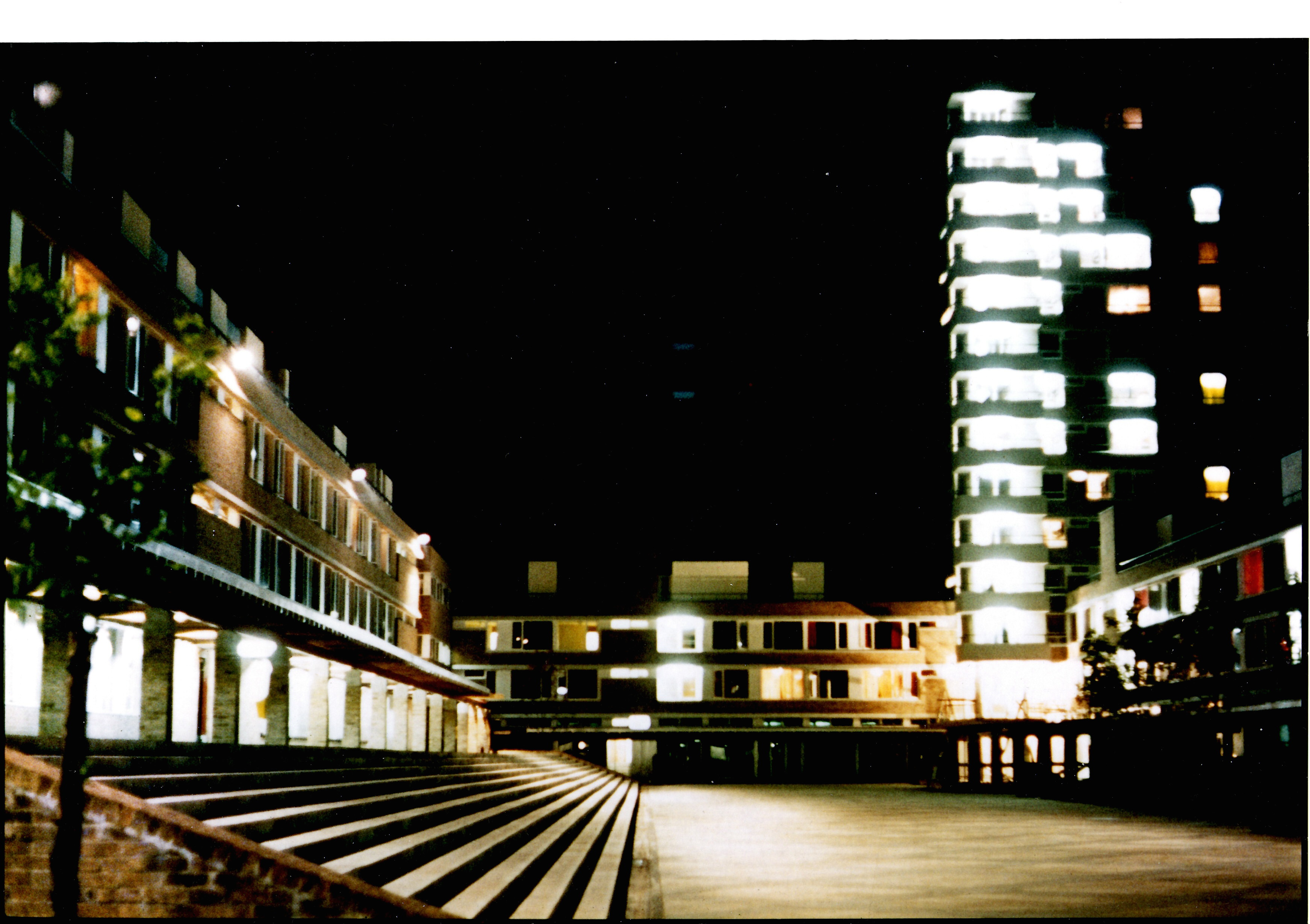
Alexandra Square, Lancaster University (1968)

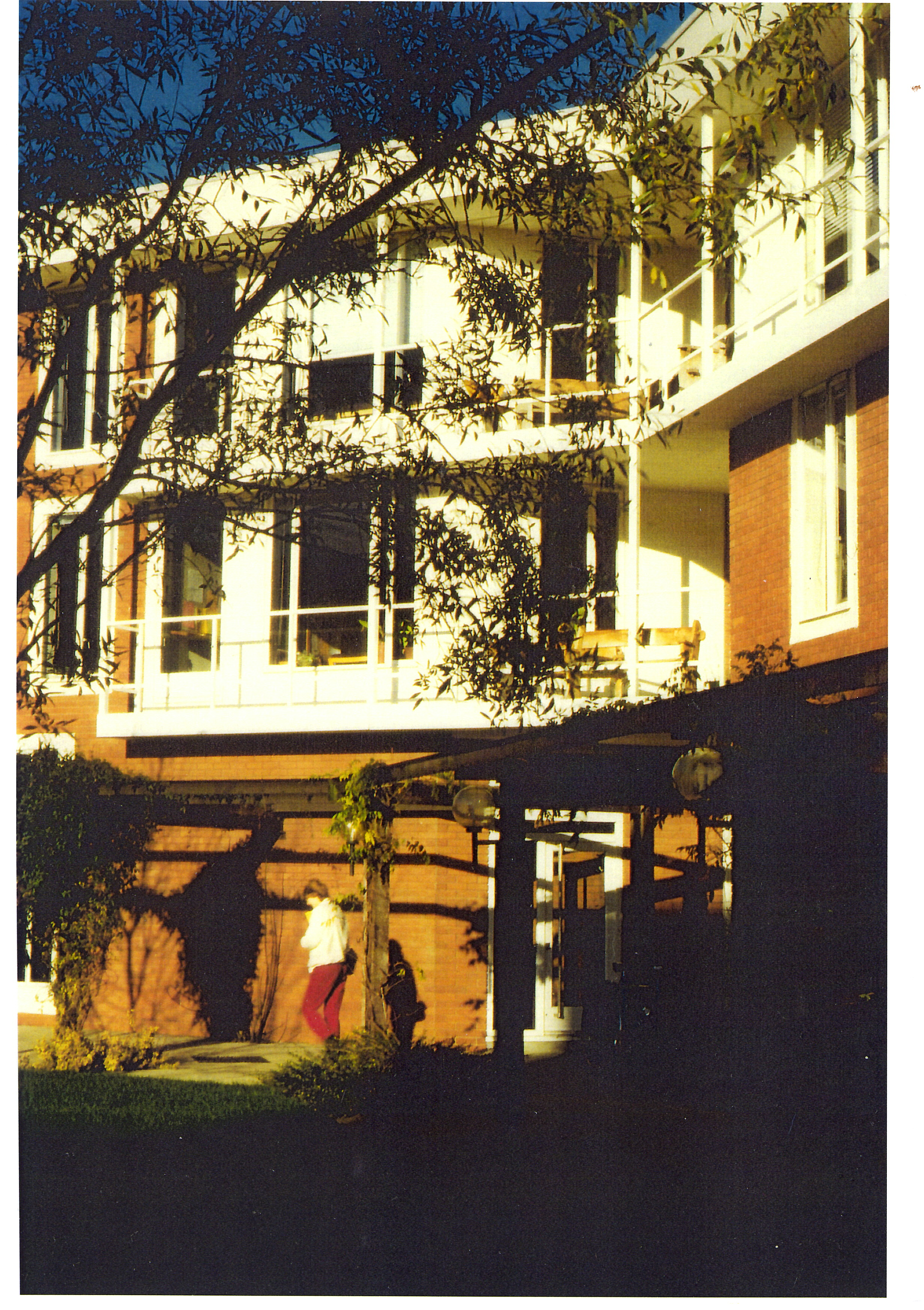
Warwick University, Social Sciences buildings (1972)

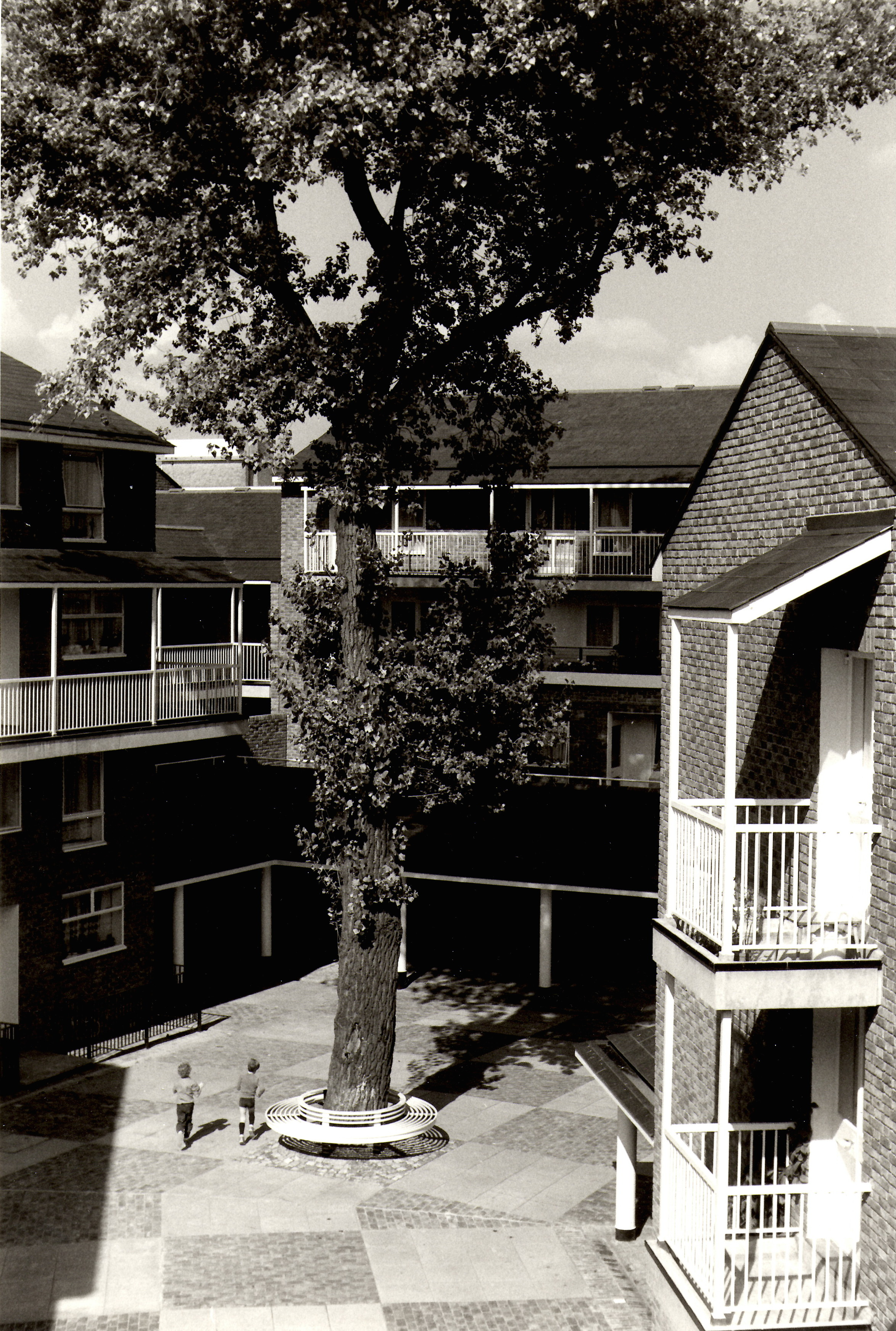
Social housing in Pigott Street, London (1982)

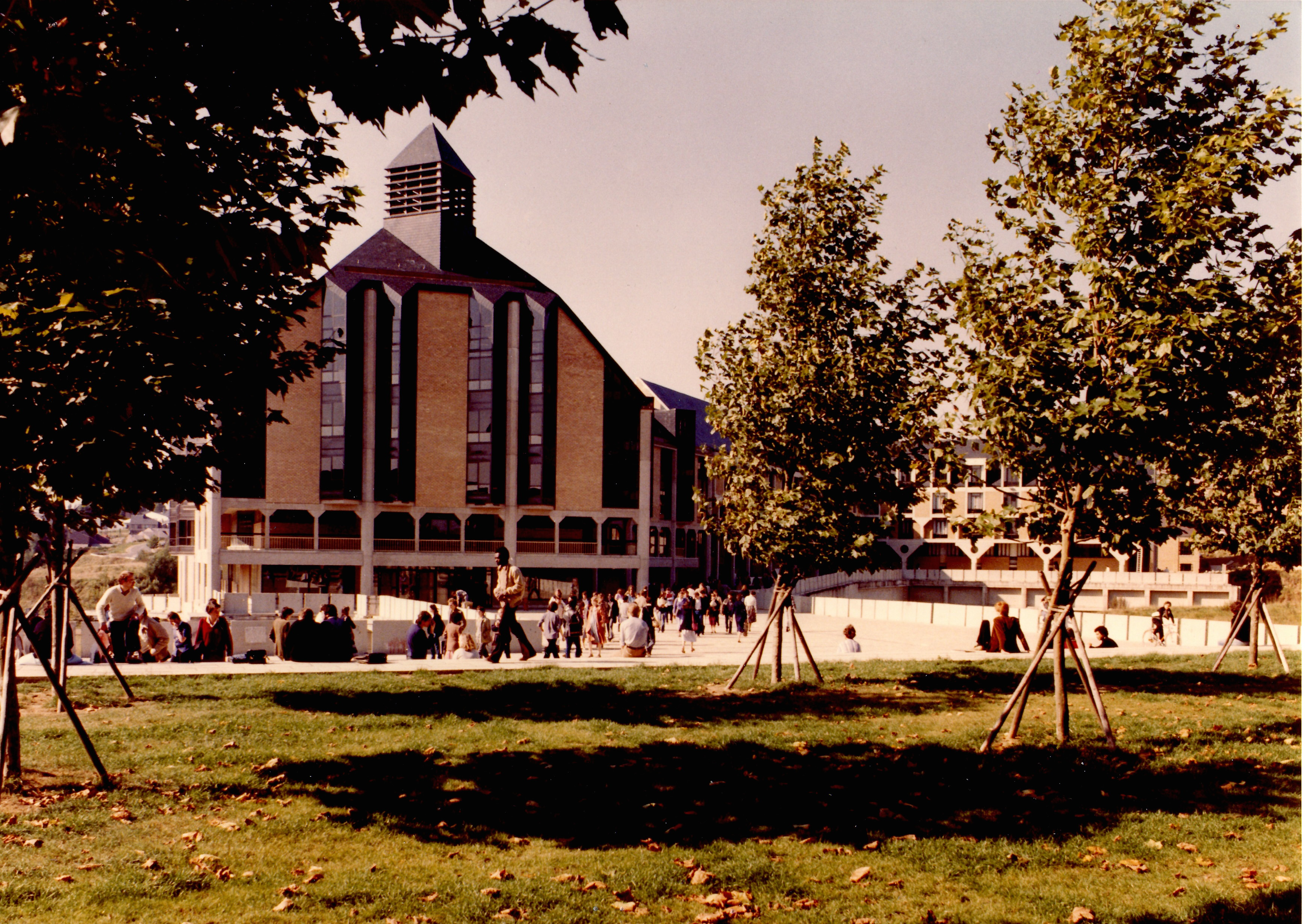
Louvain University, Belgium (1982). Library and Faculty

After graduation, Gabriel Epstein went into practice with Derek Bridgwater and Peter Shepheard. The firm was first known as Bridgwater and Shepheard, later Shepheard and Epstein and later still Shepheard Epstein and Hunter. Until his departure from the practice in 1986, Epstein designed social housing in London, colleges of education and schools. Epstein's master plan for the University of Lancaster was made up of buildings of a modest scale that were arranged around a central walkway known as "The Spine", which ran from north to south and was covered for most of its length. The campus design was described by Sir Charles Frederick Carter, the founding vice-chairman, as "one of the major achievements of British architecture", which "set new standards and precepts for all University and Urban Plans".

A series of intervention plans followed, including the redesign plan of the University of Warwick, and the redesign of the master plan as well as the addition of new buildings for The Open University in Milton Keynes. Epstein also designed a new campus at Chelsea College (University of London) which was never actually built. Outside the United Kingdom, Epstein designed a master plan for the University of Ghana and was responsible for several buildings at the Catholic University of Louvain, situated in Louvain-la-Neuve (Belgium). Epstein was also the planning consultant to the University of Konstanz, Germany.

Beginning in 1979, Gabriel Epstein divided his time between his work in London, and his teaching as Director of the Institute of Public Buildings and University Planning (Institut für öffentliche Bauten und Hochschulplanung) of the University of Stuttgart, Germany. Epstein was also Professor at its Centre for Infrastructure Planning. From the 1990s he lived in Paris, France, with his wife Josette and their three children.

== On Architecture and Urban Planning ==
Epstein's emphasis was to create an environment in which people would have pleasure to live and work rather than an architectural statement per se: "The conflict between the building and life always results from a concentration on the building as a building, the building as a shape, the building as the great work. (...)Our birth, our life, and our death are rooted in the sensual and we can never forget that".

Sensuousness is a theme he often stressed when discussing his work: "I care for materials that age gracefully, for rhythm, proportion, roofs and a lively contrast between light and dark surfaces, especially in the English climate." Epstein encouraged his students and planners to be more attentive to the men and women who use their buildings and towns, or in his own words, to "get on their wavelength so as to know what people would need and love if they knew how to ask".

"The real problem is to conceive and plan great humane urban centres, he wrote. It is this and the creation of public spaces which has concerned me for years. In this regard we do not deal with short-lived tendencies: the sensual and functional relation of people to public space is unchanging and practically independent of climate and culture. The meaning of Venice, Cambridge or Isphahan is the same for all; it flows from the experience of the spaces and the life that goes on in them. For a long time, we have assumed that cities cannot be built without creating problems, that they can no longer satisfy us in terms of humanity, economics, aesthetics or culture in the way they once did. And yet we shall build them because our cities are still expanding and those of the developing world will grow enormously for decades. (...) I believe that our modern conditions can be harmonized in practice with the traditional concept of the city – the city that is the foundation of our culture."

National Life Stories conducted an oral history interview (C467/89) with Gabriel Epstein in 2009 for its Architects Lives' collection held by the British Library.

== Awards and honours ==
Gabriel Epstein was a member of the Council of the Architectural Association from 1956 to 1965 and was President of the Architectural Association from 1963 to 1964. In 1970 he received an Honorary Doctorate from the University of Lancaster for "Distinguished contribution to architecture, and especially to the University". In the same year, he became a lifelong member of the Academy of Arts, Berlin. In 1976 he was elected President of the Franco-British Union of Architects and in 1978 became a member of the SADG (Société des Architectes Diplômés par le Gouvernement, Paris).

== Major designed and directed projects ==
- Many large-scale social housing schemes, amongst them six prize-winning schemes in the London area, starting from 1951.
- Several schools, colleges of education, university colleges, etc. in London, Oxford, Windsor, Leicester, Lincoln, etc. (1950–1980)
- Liverpool Students Union, now the Liverpool Guild of Students building (160 Mount Pleasant), 1964
- University of Lancaster (master plan and buildings), 1963–1986
- University of Ghana, Accra (revised master plan), 1968–1980
- University of Konstanz, Germany (planning consultant), 1968
- University of Makerere, Kampala, Uganda (planning consultant), 1970
- University of Warwick (re-design of master plan and several faculty buildings), 1971
- University of Warwick (Social science buildings), 1972
- University of Louvain, Belgium (central library, two lecture hall complexes and two faculty buildings), 1970–1982
- Open University, Milton Keynes (redesign of master plan and several buildings), 1975–1986
- Chelsea College, University of London (plan for new campus in Wandsworth), 1976
- Chelsea College, University of London (students residence), 1976
- University of Ghana, Legon, Accra (design of master plan extension), 1976
- University and National Library, Accra, Ghana (not executed), 1977
- University of Tlemcen, Algeria (master plan, with WS Atkins International, not executed), 1978
- London Docks, Wapping (development plan – traffic, housing, commerce, sports – for the London Borough of Tower Hamlets, not executed), 1977–1981
- Limehouse Basin, London (development plan for apartments, offices, leisure, commerce, workshops, with Waits, not executed), 1981
- Gough Grove and Pigott Street, London (social housing), 1975–1982
- University of London's Senate House (extension), 1984
- Prince's Dock, Liverpool (development plan – housing, commerce, offices, exhibition centre – for the Mersey Docks & Harbour Co.), 1985
- St Katharine Docks, London (development plan for extension – for St Katherine-by-the-Tower Co.Ltd, not executed), 1985–1986)
- Pôle Universitaire, Hauts-de-Seine, France (consultant), 1992
- Université du Plateau St Martin, Cergy-Pontoise, France (consultant), 1992
- Quartier Léopold and European Parliament Complex, Brussels (planning consultant), 1993–1994

== Prizes and awards ==
- Ministry Medal for Good Design in Housing, for housing in Camden Town, 1968
- Civic Trust Award for the University of Lancaster, 1968
- Highly Commended for Good Design in Housing for GLC Housing at Gough Grove, Tower Hamlets, 1976
- London Region Award of the Royal Institute of British Architects for housing at Gough Grove, London, 1977
- International Prize for Architecture from the Belgian National Housing Institute, for housing at Pigott Street, London, UK, 1983
