= Herbert Storey =

English businessman (1853–1933)

Herbert Lushington Storey (1853–1933) was a businessman and High Sheriff of Lancashire.

Storey was a son of Sir Thomas Storey and was born in Lancaster, Lancashire in 1853. After his education at Friends' School, the Royal Grammar School, Lancaster and Derby Grammar School, he spent some time working for the engineering firm of James Farmer in Salford before attending Owens College for further education. He also visited Germany to learn both the language and the business methods adopted in that country.

A Liberal Unionist, Storey was a Lancaster town councillor for eight years (Note: Storey contested the St Anne's ward in 1892 and the Lancaster Gazette commented of his candidature that "His position as one of the members of the firm of Storey Bros. will gain him many votes ... We disapprove altogether of the introduction of politics into municipal affairs but the practice is steadily on the increase".) and was made a county magistrate in 1898. He was also a philanthropist, enabling extension lectures at the University of Lancaster and, in 1902, giving £10,000 to extend the Storey Institute that had initially been funded by his father. In the same year, he gave £5,000 to the Royal Albert Asylum for the erection of what were named the Herbert Storey Industrial Schools and Workshops. He also had a significant role in the development of Westfield War Memorial Village.

Storey was appointed High Sheriff of Lancashire in March 1904, ten years after his father had held the same office. A wooden arch was erected on Lancaster's Penny Street to commemorate the event. He held various company directorships at that time, including the Lancaster-based businesses of Storey Bros. & Co. at White Cross Linoleum Mills and the Rembrandt Intaglio Printing Company. Other directorships were with the Barrow and Calcutta Flax and Jute Company, the Ackers, Whitley and Co. collieries in Wigan and the Darwen and Mostyn Iron Company.

A keen sportsman as a young man — he played rugby union for Owens College, Manchester Rangers, Preston Grasshoppers and his county — Storey was a founder and president of Vale of Lune RUFC. His interest in boating caused him to come close to drowning in 1875 as he attempted to sail from Lancaster to Morecambe in a canoe. He was also a keen huntsman and held offices with the Vale of Lune Hunt, and he was a successful livestock breeder. He lived in Bailrigg, Lancaster and died in 1933.

He was married and had a son and a daughter.
