= Peter Shepheard =

British architect and landscape architect

Peter Shepheard

Sir Peter Faulkner Shepheard CBE FRTPI FILA (11 November 1913 – 11 April 2002) was a British architect and landscape architect.

== Biography ==
He was born in Oxton, Birkenhead and educated at Birkenhead School. His father was an architect. He also studied architecture at the Liverpool School of Architecture under Charles Reilly. He obtained a first-class degree in 1936 and won the graduate scholarship. From 1940 to 1943, he worked for the Ministry of Supply, working on the design and construction of arms factories under tight time pressure. In 1943, his godfather, Patrick Abercrombie, offered Shepheard a job on the Greater London Plan for the postwar development of London. Shepheard then worked for William Holford at the Ministry of Town and Country Planning, and became deputy chief architect for the Stevenage Development Corporation (1947–48).

He started in partnership with Derek Bridgwater and, after Bridgwater retired in 1962, the firm became Shepheard, Epstein and Hunter as Shepheard was joined by Gabriel Epstein and Peter Hunter. He designed houses for London County Council, schools for local authorities and a new hall for Winchester College, teacher training colleges, and buildings for the universities of Keele, Liverpool, Warwick and Oxford, Chelsea College, London, the Open University and the University of Lancaster.

He became best known for many landscape projects such as London Zoo, Bessborough Gardens, Bunhill Fields in the City, the restoration of Vanessa Bell's garden at Charleston Farmhouse in Sussex and various gardens in the United States including Central Green at the University of Pennsylvania campus and the Morris Arboretum. Nikolaus Pevsner asked him to illustrate two books on ducks and woodland birds. He also produced all the line drawings for his own books, Modern Gardens (1953) and Gardens (1969). His painting of Liverpool Docks after bombing is in the Walker Art Gallery.

The Architectural Association elected him president in 1954, and he was soon serving on 17 committees. From 1969 to 1971 he was president of the Royal Institute of British Architects. Shepheard was also president of the Landscape Institute from 1965 to 1966 and the Royal Fine Art Commission (1968–71). He joined the National Parks Commission (1966–68), the Countryside Commission (1968-71), the Civic Trust and from 1976 to 2001 he was honorary artistic adviser to the Commonwealth War Graves Commission. He spent six months a year for eight years from 1971 as dean of the graduate school of fine art at the University of Pennsylvania. In 1984 he was elected Master of the Art Workers' Guild.

National Life Stories conducted an oral history interview (C467/20) with Peter Shepheard in 1997 for its Architects Lives' collection held by the British Library.

== Awards ==
Shepheard received an Honorary Doctorate from Heriot-Watt University in 1979.

He was appointed Commander of the Order of the British Empire in 1972 and on 7 January 1980 was appointed a Knight Bachelor for services to Architecture. He was awarded the Landscape Institute Gold Medal in 2000.

== Personal life ==
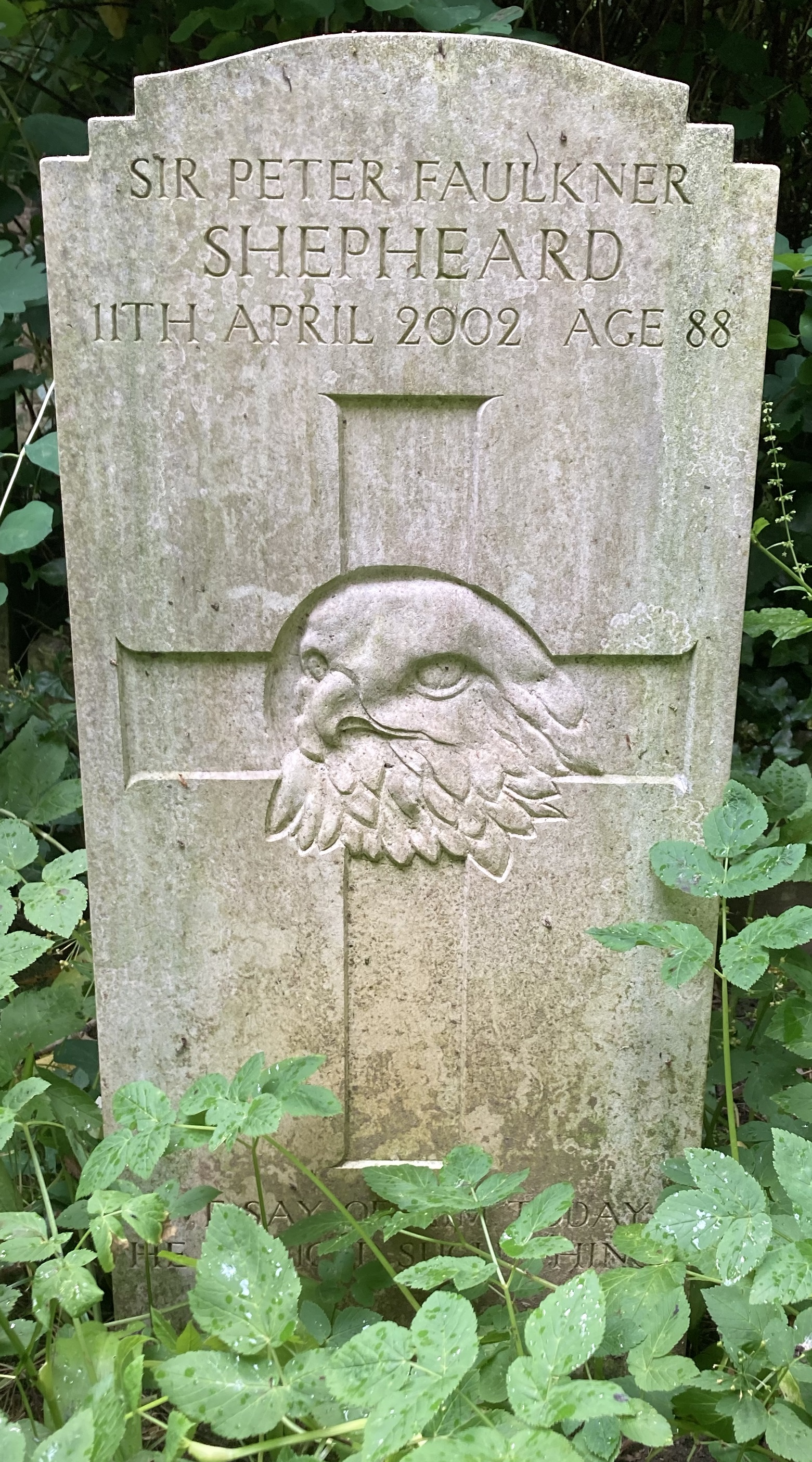
Grave of Sir Peter Shepheard in Highgate Cemetery

He and his wife, Mary Bailey, married in 1943 and they had a son, Paul, and daughter, Sarah.

He died on 11th April, 2002 and was buried on the western side of Highgate Cemetery.
