= Retorica =

Violin duo

Retorica, Harriet Mackenzie and Philippa Mo, violins, perform JS Bach 2-part Invention No.2 in C minor

Retorica is a violin duo formed in 2007 by Philippa Mo and Harriet MacKenzie. A violin duo is considered to be a rare ensemble but Retorica are becoming known for their commitment to establishing the genre In 2011, Retorica toured China including concerts at the Beijing National Center of the Arts (NCPA) and Shanghai Oriental Art Center. In 2012 Retorica broadcast live on BBC Radio 3 In Tune and were artists in residence for the 2012 Presteigne festival city tour

Notable composers who have written music for Retorica include John McCabe (composer), Paul Pellay, Jim Aitchison, Robert Fokkens, Ben Ellin, Owen Bourne, David Matthews (composer), Sadie Harrison and Dmitri Smirnov (composer). As well as this new repertoire, Retorica perform duos by Mozart, Haydn, Jean-Marie Leclair, Henryk Wieniawski, Alan Rawsthorne, Eugène Ysaÿe, Prokofiev, Ligeti, Telemann, George Frideric Handel, Gorecki, Honegger, and also their arrangements of Bach Inventions and the famous folk-derived duos by Bartók. One of the most notable additions to Retorica's repertoire is a new sonata written exclusively for them by DJ and composer Gabriel Prokofiev, premiered in March 2014 at Live at LICA.

The Retorica debut CD English Violin Duos, released by NMC in August 2012, has been chosen by Gramophone magazine as a 'must hear' recording in the April 2013 issue.
