= The Storey =

- Storey Institute
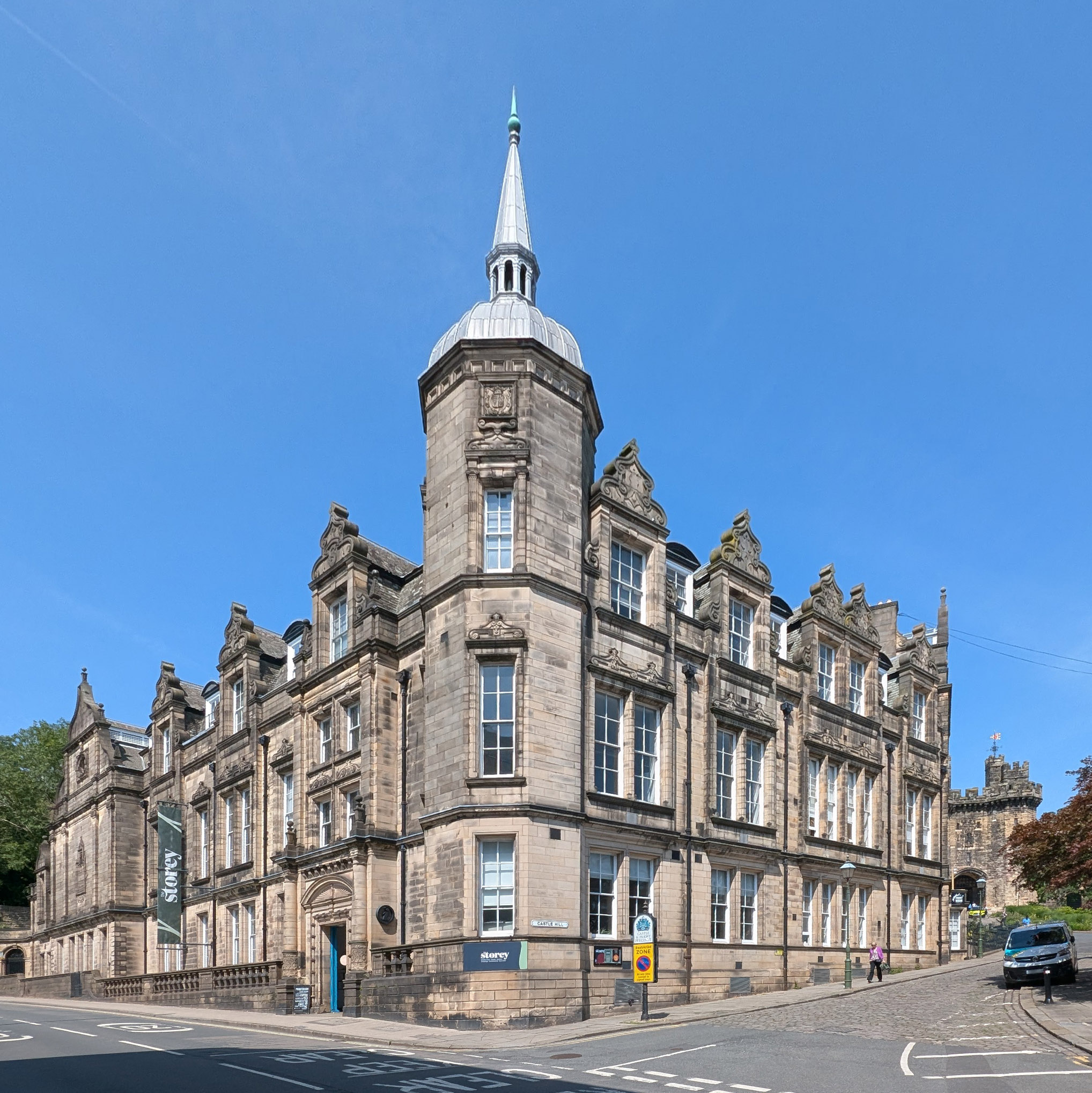
- The Storey

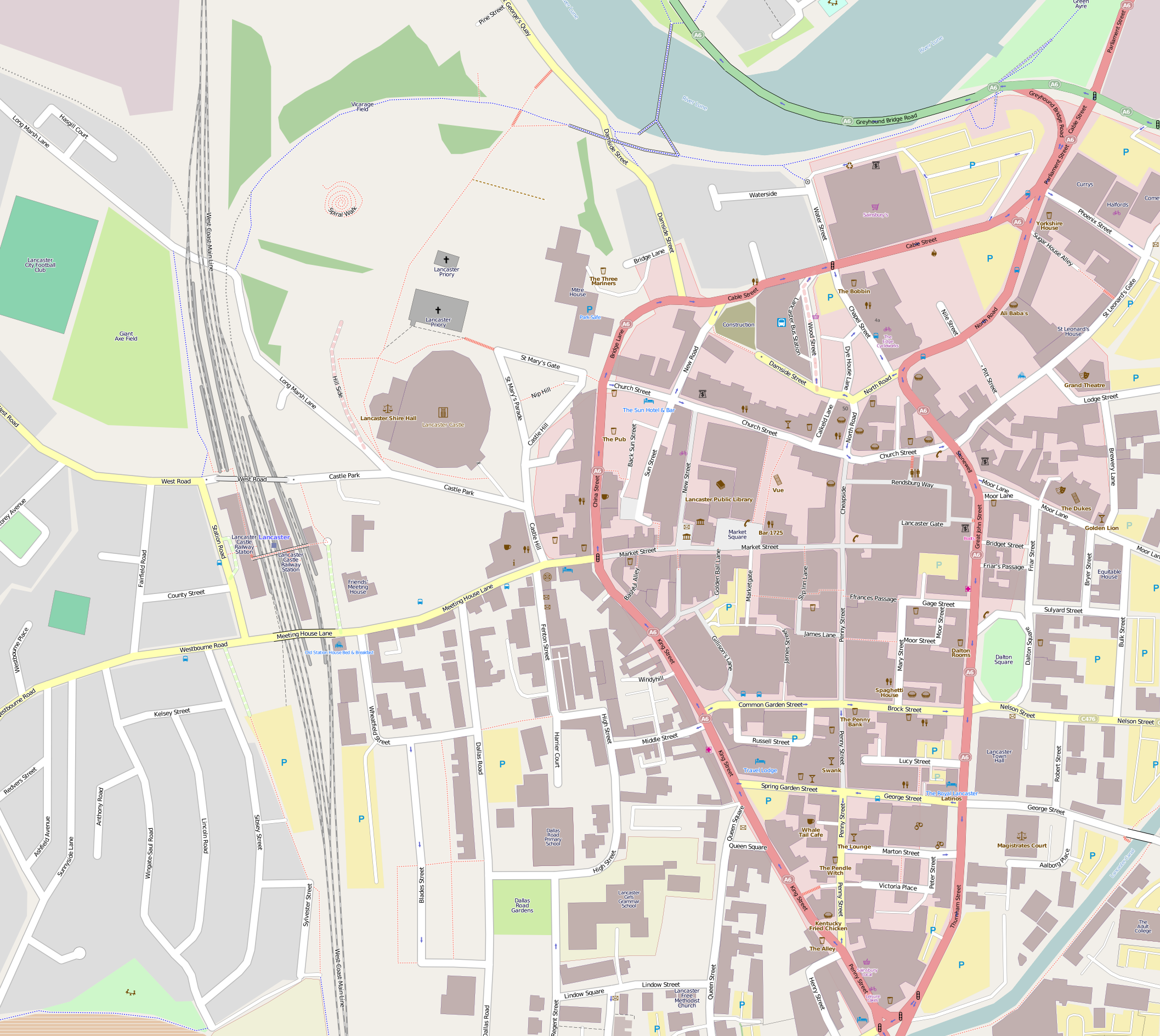
- Location in Lancaster
- 54.0487°N 2.8043°W
- OS grid reference: SD 474,617

History
- Built: 1887–1891
- Built for: Lancaster City Council

Site notes
- Architect(s): Paley, Austin and Paley; Austin and Paley
- Architectural style: Jacobean Revival

Listed Building – Grade II
- Official name: Storey Institute
- Designated: 18 February 1970
- Reference no.: 1194973

Listed Building – Grade II
- Official name: Storey Institute, Back Entrance
- Designated: 22 December 1953
- Reference no.: 1194906

The Storey, formerly the Storey Institute, is a multi-purpose building located at the corner of Meeting House Lane and Castle Hill in Lancaster, Lancashire, England. Its main part is recorded in the National Heritage List for England as a designated Grade II listed building, with its back entrance being listed separately, also at Grade II.

== History ==
The building was constructed between 1887 and 1891 as a replacement for the Lancaster Mechanic's Institute, to commemorate Queen Victoria's Golden Jubilee. It was paid for by Thomas Storey, a local businessman who had been mayor in the year of the Jubilee, and was renamed the Storey Institute in his honour in 1891. Its purpose was "the promotion of art, science, literature, and technical instruction". The building was designed by the architects Paley, Austin and Paley whose office stood nearby. It contained a reading room, a library, a lecture room, a laboratory, a music room, a picture gallery, a school of art, and accommodation for a caretaker. The building cost about £12,000 (equivalent to £1,320,000 in 2025). In 1906–08 it was extended to commemorate the accession of Edward VII. This was designed by the successors in the architectural practice, Austin and Paley, to provide more rooms for teaching. Thomas Storey's son, Herbert, paid £10,000 towards the cost of the extension, which almost doubled the size of the building.

Over the years, the building has been housed the City Art Gallery, the public library, a girls’ grammar school, and from the 1950s to 1982, Lancaster College of Art. The opening art exhibition, held in 1889, included paintings by Gainsborough, Constable and Canaletto. The art collection included paintings by local artists including Samuel John "Lamorna" Birch and William Hoggatt. In the 1960s there were touring exhibitions of works by Picasso, Matisse, and Francis Bacon. The art collection was moved in 1968 to Lancaster City Museum. By the 1980s the gallery was rarely used, but in 1991 a group of local artists re-established it as the Storey Gallery, and delivered a continuous programme of over 100 exhibitions of contemporary art until 2013. The exhibition programme included one-person shows by Andy Goldsworthy, Gillian Ayres, Basil Beattie, Simon Callery, Anthony Green, Albert Irvin, Michael Kenny, Sophie Ryder and Richard Wilson, plus touring exhibitions from Japan, Spain, and Italy, and a variety of curated group shows. In 1998 the walled gardens behind the institute were laid out as an art work, The Tasting Garden, by Mark Dion.

In the early 21st century the institute was converted into a multi-use building by Lancaster City Council, and was renamed The Storey. It provided accommodation for small businesses, a café, galleries and exhibitions areas, workshops and an information centre.

== Architecture ==
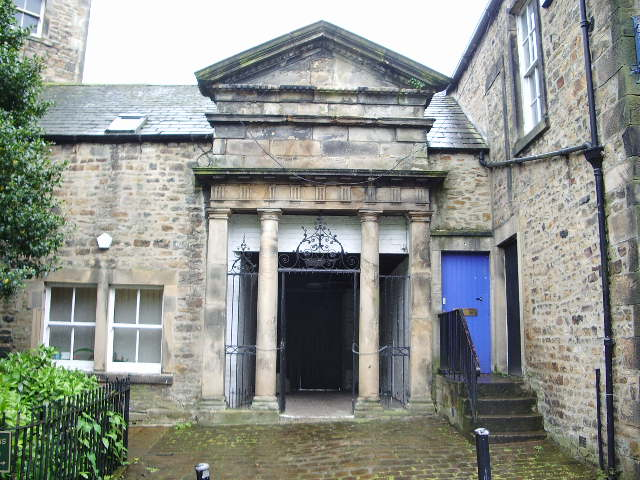
Back entrance

=== Main building ===
The building is constructed in sandstone ashlar with slate roofs, and is in Jacobean Revival style. It has façades on two fronts, with a turret on the corner. The turret is octagonal, with a lead dome surmounted by a spirelet. The building is in two storeys plus attics, above which are gables, some shaped and some segmental. Inside the building, on the first floor, is a curved window containing stained glass designed by E H Jewett of Shrigley and Hunt depicting representations of the arts. Also on this floor is a top-lit exhibition gallery.

=== Back entrance ===
This consists of a portico in Roman Doric style with two columns supporting a triglyph frieze and a cornice. At its summit is a pediment decorated with dentils. It contains its original wrought iron gates and overthrow. The structure was moved from an 18th-century house that was demolished in 1921, and rebuilt on the present site. The entrance leads to walled gardens behind the institute.

== See also ==
- Listed buildings in Lancaster, Lancashire
- List of works by Paley, Austin and Paley
- List of non-ecclesiastical works by Austin and Paley (1895–1914)
