= Pigott Street =

Street in Poplar, London

Coordinates: 51°30′46″N 0°01′33″W

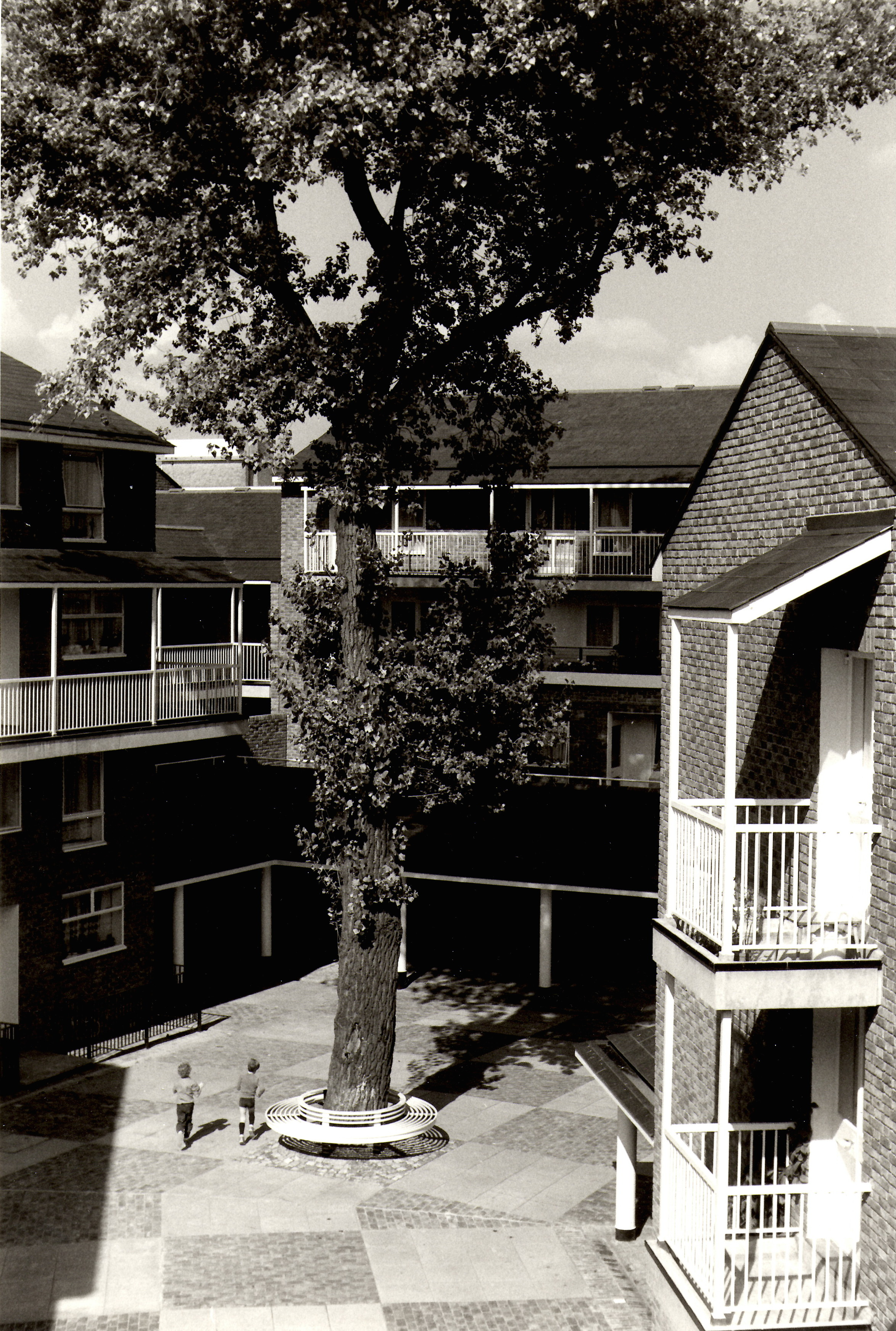
Social housing in Pigott Street, designed by Gabriel Epstein

Pigott Street is a road in Limehouse and Poplar, Tower Hamlets, London. The blocks of flats on it form part of the last phase of the building of the Lansbury Estate, and border the southern end of Burdett Road on the west.

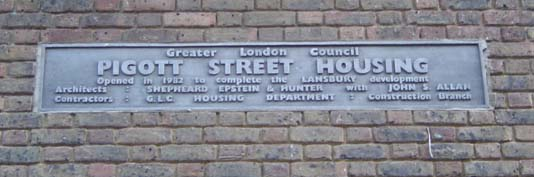
Plaque commemorating the final building phase of Lansbury Estate.

The housing was completed in 1982 by the Greater London Council, although earlier phases in the Lansbury Estate were implemented by the London County Council. In 1998, ownership of part of the estate including Pigott Street transferred to a local housing association, Poplar HARCA.

Along with various other nearby streets, it is named after the family of Francis Pigott Stainsby Conant, MP for Reading Lieutenant Governor of the Isle of Man 1860–1863. This family held 38 acres (150,000 m^{2}) of land in Poplar and Limehouse in the 19th century.

== See also ==
- List of eponymous roads in London
