= Albert Irvin =

English painter (1922–2015)

- Born: Albert Henry Thomas Irvin; 21 August 1922; Bermondsey, London, England
- Died: 26 March 2015 (aged 92); Tooting, London, England
- Known for: Painting
- Movement: Expressionist abstract
- Awards: OBE
- Website: albert-irvin.com

Albert Henry Thomas Irvin OBE RA (21 August 1922 – 26 March 2015) was an English expressionist abstract artist.

== Life and career ==
Irvin was born in Bermondsey, London on 21 August 1922. He was evacuated from there during World War II, to study at the Northampton School of Art between 1940 and 1941, before being conscripted into the Royal Air Force as a navigator. When the war was over, he resumed his course at Goldsmiths College from 1946 to 1950. He went on to teach there between 1962 and 1983, on good terms with Basil Beattie and Harry Thubron. He was elected to The London Group in 1955. He worked in studios in the East End of London from 1970 onwards.

In the early 1950s, Bert met and was hugely influenced by many of the "St Ives" artists including Peter Lanyon, Roger Hilton, Terry Frost and Sandra Blow.

He won a major Arts Council Award in 1975 and a Gulbenkian Award for printmaking in 1983. He was elected a Royal Academician in 1998.

His work is widely exhibited both in the UK and abroad, in such places as Arts Council of Great Britain, Birmingham City Art Gallery, the Chase Manhattan Bank, the Contemporary Art Society, Manchester City Art Gallery, Whitworth Gallery Manchester, Leeds City Gallery Tate Britain, the Victoria and Albert Museum Oxford University, Cambridge University and Warwick University Arts Centre.

His influences included Walter Sickert, Henri Matisse, J. M. W. Turner, Jack Smith and Edward Middleditch.

Irvin was appointed Officer of the Order of the British Empire (OBE) in the 2013 Birthday Honours for services to the visual arts.

He married Beatrice Olive Nicolson in August 1947. Irvin died in Tooting, London on 26 March 2015, at the age of 92. His wife survived him, and died in Tooting in September 2015, at the age of 93.
