= List of companies listed on the Malaysia Exchange =

This is a list of companies listed on the Malaysia Exchange (MYX) under the Main Market, ordered alphabetically. The names of the companies appear exactly as they do on the stock exchange listing. This is not an exhaustive list, but reflects the list that appears on the Main Market as of 10 April 2017.

== !-9 ==
| Company name | Stock Code |
|---|---|
| 7-Eleven Malaysia Holdings Berhad | MYX: 5250 |

== A ==
| Company name | Stock Code |
|---|---|
| A & M Realty Berhad | MYX: 5959 |
| A-Rank Berhad | MYX: 7214 |
| Ablegroup Berhad | MYX: 7086 |
| ABM Fujiya Berhad | MYX: 5198 |
| ACME Holdings Berhad | MYX: 7131 |
| Acoustech Berhad | MYX: 7120 |
| Advance Synergy Berhad | MYX: 1481 |
| Advanced Packaging Technology (M) Berhad | MYX: 9148 |
| Adventa Berhad | MYX: 7191 |
| AE Multi Holdings Berhad | MYX: 7146 |
| AEON Co. (M) Berhad | MYX: 6599 |
| AEON Credit Service (M) Berhad | MYX: 5139 |
| Affin Holdings Berhad | MYX: 5185 |
| AHB Holdings Berhad | MYX: 7315 |
| Ahmad Zaki Resources Berhad | MYX: 7078 |
| Capital A Berhad | MYX: 5099 |
| AirAsia X Berhad | MYX: 5238 |
| Ajinomoto (Malaysia) Berhad | MYX: 2658 |
| Ajiya Berhad | MYX: 7609 |
| Al-'Aqar Healthcare REIT | MYX: 5116 |
| Al-Salam Real Estate Investment Trust | MYX: 5269 |
| Alam Maritim Resources Berhad | MYX: 5115 |
| Alliance Financial Group Berhad | MYX: 2488 |
| Allianz Malaysia Berhad | MYX: 1163 |
| Aluminium Company of Malaysia Berhad | MYX: 2674 |
| Amalgamated Industrial Steel Berhad | MYX: 2682 |
| Amanah Harta Tanah PNB | MYX: 4952 |
| AmanahRaya Real Estate Investment Trust | MYX: 5127 |
| Amcorp Properties Berhad | MYX: 1007 |
| AmFIRST Real Estate Investment Trust | MYX: 5120 |
| AMMB Holdings Berhad | MYX: 1015 |
| AMTEK Holdings Berhad | MYX: 7051 |
| Amtel Holdings Berhad | MYX: 7031 |
| Amway (Malaysia) Holdings Berhad | MYX: 6351 |
| Analabs Resources Berhad | MYX: 7083 |
| Ancom Berhad | MYX: 4758 |
| Ann Joo Resources Berhad | MYX: 6556 |
| Anzo Holdings Berhad | MYX: 9342 |
| APB Resources Berhad | MYX: 5568 |
| Apex Equity Holdings Berhad | MYX: 5088 |
| Apex Healthcare Berhad | MYX: 7090 |
| APFT Berhad | MYX: 5194 |
| APM Automotive Holdings Berhad | MYX: 5015 |
| Apollo Food Holdings Berhad | MYX: 6432 |
| ARK Resources Berhad | MYX: 7007 |
| Asia Brands Berhad | MYX: 7722 |
| Asia File Corporation Berhad | MYX: 7129 |
| Asia Knight Berhad | MYX: 9954 |
| Asia Media Group Berhad | MYX: 0159 |
| Asiamet Education Group Berhad | MYX: 5166 |
| Asian PAC Holdings Berhad | MYX: 4057 |
| Astino Berhad | MYX: 7162 |
| Astral Asia Berhad | MYX: 7054 |
| Astro Malaysia Holdings Berhad | MYX: 6399 |
| Atlan Holdings Berhad | MYX: 7048 |
| Atrium Real Estate Investment Trust | MYX: 5130 |
| Atta Global Group Berhad | MYX: 7099 |
| Aturmaju Resources Berhad | MYX: 7181 |
| AWC Berhad | MYX: 7579 |
| Axiata Group Berhad | MYX: 6888 |
| Axis Real Estate Investment Trust | MYX: 5106 |
| AYS Ventures Berhad | MYX: 5021 |

== B ==
| Company name | Stock Code |
|---|---|
| B.I.G. Industries Berhad | MYX: 7005 |
| Barakah Offshore Petroleum Berhad | MYX: 7251 |
| Batu Kawan Berhad | MYX: 1899 |
| BCB Berhad | MYX: 6602 |
| Benalec Holdings Berhad | MYX: 5190 |
| Berjaya Assets Berhad | MYX: 3239 |
| Berjaya Corporation Berhad | MYX: 3395 |
| Berjaya Food Berhad | MYX: 5196 |
| Berjaya Land Berhad | MYX: 4219 |
| Berjaya Media Berhad | MYX: 6025 |
| Berjaya Sports Toto Berhad | MYX: 1562 |
| Bermaz Auto Berhad | MYX: 5248 |
| Bertam Alliance Berhad | MYX: 9814 |
| BHS Industries Berhad | MYX: 7241 |
| BIMB Holdings Berhad | MYX: 5258 |
| Bina Darulaman Berhad | MYX: 6173 |
| Bina Puri Holdings Berhad | MYX: 5932 |
| Bintai Kinden Corporation Berhad | MYX: 6998 |
| Bintulu Port Holdings Berhad | MYX: 5032 |
| Bio Osmo Berhad | MYX: 7243 |
| Bison Consolidated Berhad | MYX: 5275 |
| BLD Plantation Berhad | MYX: 5069 |
| Boilermech Holdings Berhad | MYX: 0168 |
| Bonia Corporation Berhad | MYX: 9288 |
| Boon Koon Group Berhad | MYX: 7187 |
| Borneo Oil Berhad | MYX: 7036 |
| Boustead Heavy Industries Corporation Berhad | MYX: 8133 |
| Boustead Holdings Berhad | MYX: 2771 |
| Boustead Plantations Berhad | MYX: 5254 |
| Box-Pak (Malaysia) Berhad | MYX: 6297 |
| BP Plastics Holding Berhad | MYX: 5100 |
| Brahim's Holdings Berhad | MYX: 9474 |
| BREM Holding Berhad | MYX: 8761 |
| Bright Packaging Industry Berhad | MYX: 9938 |
| British American Tobacco (Malaysia) Berhad | MYX: 4162 |
| BSL Corporation Berhad | MYX: 7221 |
| BTM Resources Berhad | MYX: 7188 |
| Bumi Armada Berhad | MYX: 5210 |
| Bursa Malaysia Berhad | MYX: 1818 |

== C ==
| Company name | Stock Code |
|---|---|
| C.I. Holdings Berhad | MYX: 2828 |
| CAB Cakaran Corporation Berhad | MYX: 7174 |
| Caely Holdings Berhad | MYX: 7154 |
| Cahya Mata Sarawak Berhad | MYX: 2852 |
| CAM Resources Berhad | MYX: 7128 |
| Can-One Berhad | MYX: 5105 |
| Capitaland Malaysia Mall Trust | MYX: 5180 |
| Carimin Petroleum Berhad | MYX: 5257 |
| Caring Pharmacy Group Berhad | MYX: 5245 |
| Carlsberg Brewery Malaysia Berhad | MYX: 2836 |
| CB Industrial Product Holding Berhad | MYX: 7076 |
| CCK Consolidated Holdings Berhad | MYX: 7035 |
| CCM Duopharma Biotech Berhad | MYX: 7148 |
| Censof Holdings Berhad | MYX: 5195 |
| Central Industrial Corporation Berhad | MYX: 8052 |
| Century Logistics Holdings Berhad | MYX: 7117 |
| Cepatwawasan Group Berhad | MYX: 8982 |
| Chee Wah Corporation Berhad | MYX: 9423 |
| Cheetah Holdings Berhad | MYX: 7209 |
| Chemical Company of Malaysia Berhad | MYX: 2879 |
| Chin Hin Group Berhad | MYX: 5273 |
| Chin Teck Plantations Berhad | MYX: 1929 |
| Chin Well Holdings Berhad | MYX: 5007 |
| China Automobile Parts Holdings Limited | MYX: 5229 |
| China Ouhua Winery Holdings Limited | MYX: 5188 |
| China Stationery Limited | MYX: 5214 |
| Choo Bee Metal Industries Berhad | MYX: 5797 |
| Chuan Huat Resources Berhad | MYX: 7016 |
| CIMB Group Holdings Berhad | MYX: 1023 |
| Classic Scenic Berhad | MYX: 7202 |
| CLIQ Energy Berhad | MYX: 5234 |
| CME Group Berhad | MYX: 7018 |
| CN Asia Corporation Berhad | MYX: 7986 |
| CNI Holdings Berhad | MYX: 5104 |
| Coastal Contracts Berhad | MYX: 5071 |
| Cocoaland Holdings Berhad | MYX: 7205 |
| Comfort Gloves Berhad | MYX: 2127 |
| Comintel Corporation Berhad | MYX: 7195 |
| Complete Logistic Services Berhad | MYX: 5136 |
| Compugates Holdings Berhad | MYX: 5037 |
| Computer Forms (Malaysia) Berhad | MYX: 8044 |
| Concrete Engineering Products Berhad | MYX: 8435 |
| Country Heights Holdings Berhad | MYX: 5738 |
| Country View Berhad | MYX: 5049 |
| Crescendo Corporation Berhad | MYX: 6718 |
| Crest Builder Holdings Berhad | MYX: 8591 |
| CSC Steel Holdings Berhad | MYX: 5094 |
| Cuscapi Berhad | MYX: 0051 |
| Cycle & Carriage Bintang Berhad | MYX: 2925 |
| CYL Corporation Berhad | MYX: 7157 |
| Cymao Holdings Berhad | MYX: 5082 |
| Cypark Resources Berhad | MYX: 5184 |

== D ==
| Company name | Stock Code |
|---|---|
| D & O Green Technologies Berhad | MYX: 7204 |
| D.B.E. Gurney Resources Berhad | MYX: 7179 |
| Dagang Nexchange Berhad | MYX: 4456 |
| Daibochi Plastic and Packaging Industry Berhad | MYX: 8125 |
| Daiman Development Berhad | MYX: 5355 |
| Damansara Realty Berhad | MYX: 3484 |
| Dancomech Holdings Berhad | MYX: 5276 |
| Dataprep Holdings Berhad | MYX: 8338 |
| NexG Berhad | MYX: 5216 |
| Daya Materials Berhad | MYX: 0091 |
| Dayang Enterprise Holdings Berhad | MYX: 5141 |
| Degem Berhad | MYX: 7119 |
| Deleum Berhad | MYX: 5132 |
| Denko Industrial Corporation Berhad | MYX: 8176 |
| Destini Berhad | MYX: 7212 |
| Dialog Group Berhad | MYX: 7277 |
| Digi.Com Berhad | MYX: 6947 |
| Digistar Corporation Berhad | MYX: 0029 |
| DKLS Industries Berhad | MYX: 7528 |
| DKSH Holdings (Malaysia) Berhad | MYX: 5908 |
| D'nonce Technology Berhad | MYX: 7114 |
| Dolomite Corporation Berhad | MYX: 5835 |
| Dolphin International Berhad | MYX: 5265 |
| Dominant Enterprise Berhad | MYX: 7169 |
| DPS Resources Berhad | MYX: 7198 |
| DRB-HICOM Berhad | MYX: 1619 |
| Dufu Technology Corp. Berhad | MYX: 7233 |
| Dutaland Berhad | MYX: 3948 |
| Dutch Lady Milk Industries Berhad | MYX: 3026 |

== E ==
| Company name | Stock Code |
|---|---|
| E.A. Technique (M) Berhad | MYX: 5259 |
| Eastern & Oriental Berhad | MYX: 3417 |
| Eastland Equity Berhad | MYX: 2097 |
| ECM Libra Financial Group Berhad | MYX: 2143 |
| Eco World Development Group Berhad | MYX: 8206 |
| Eco World International Berhad | MYX: 5283 |
| Ecofirst Consolidated Berhad | MYX: 3557 |
| Econpile Holdings Berhad | MYX: 5253 |
| ECS ICT Berhad | MYX: 5162 |
| Edaran Berhad | MYX: 5036 |
| Eden Inc. Berhad | MYX: 7471 |
| Efficient E-Solutions Berhad | MYX: 0064 |
| EG Industries Berhad | MYX: 8907 |
| EITA Resources Berhad | MYX: 5208 |
| EKA Noodles Berhad | MYX: 7182 |
| Ekovest Berhad | MYX: 8877 |
| Ekowood International Berhad | MYX: 5091 |
| Eksons Corporation Berhad | MYX: 9016 |
| ELK-Desa Resources Berhad | MYX: 5228 |
| Elsoft Research Berhad | MYX: 0090 |
| Emico Holdings Berhad | MYX: 9091 |
| Encorp Berhad | MYX: 6076 |
| Eng Kah Corporation Berhad | MYX: 7149 |
| Engtex Group Berhad | MYX: 5056 |
| ENRA Group Berhad | MYX: 8613 |
| Eonmetall Group Berhad | MYX: 7217 |
| EP Manufacturing Berhad | MYX: 7773 |
| Esthetics International Group Berhad | MYX: 5081 |
| EUPE Corporation Berhad | MYX: 6815 |
| Euro Holdings Berhad | MYX: 7208 |
| Eurospan Holdings Berhad | MYX: 7094 |
| Evergreen Fibreboard Berhad | MYX: 5101 |
| Eversendai Corporation Berhad | MYX: 5205 |
| Ewein Berhad | MYX: 7249 |
| Excel Force MSC Berhad | MYX: 0065 |

== F ==
| Company name | Stock Code |
|---|---|
| FACB Industries Incorporated Berhad | MYX: 2984 |
| Fajarbaru Builder Group Berhad | MYX: 7047 |
| Far East Holdings Berhad | MYX: 5029 |
| Farlim Group (Malaysia) Berhad | MYX: 6041 |
| Farm's Best Berhad | MYX: 9776 |
| Favelle Favco Berhad | MYX: 7229 |
| FCW Holdings Berhad | MYX: 2755 |
| Federal Furniture Holdings (M) Berhad | MYX: 8605 |
| Felda Global Ventures Holdings Berhad | MYX: 5222 |
| Fiamma Holdings Berhad | MYX: 6939 |
| Fibon Berhad | MYX: 0149 |
| Fima Corporation Berhad | MYX: 3107 |
| Fitters Diversified Berhad | MYX: 9318 |
| Focus Lumber Berhad | MYX: 5197 |
| Formosa Prosonic Industries Berhad | MYX: 9172 |
| Foundpac Group Berhad | MYX: 5277 |
| Fraser & Neave Holdings Berhad | MYX: 3689 |
| Freight Management Holdings Berhad | MYX: 7210 |
| Frontken Corporation Berhad | MYX: 0128 |
| FSBM Holdings Berhad | MYX: 9377 |

== G ==
| Company name | Stock Code |
|---|---|
| Gabungan AQRS Berhad | MYX: 5226 |
| Gadang Holdings Berhad | MYX: 9261 |
| Gamuda Berhad | MYX: 5398 |
| Gas Malaysia Berhad | MYX: 5209 |
| GD Express Carrier Berhad | MYX: 0078 |
| Ge-Shen Corporation Berhad | MYX: 7197 |
| Genting Berhad | MYX: 3182 |
| Genting Malaysia Berhad | MYX: 4715 |
| Genting Plantations Berhad | MYX: 2291 |
| George Kent (Malaysia) Berhad | MYX: 3204 |
| GHL Systems Berhad | MYX: 0021 |
| Global Oriental Berhad | MYX: 1147 |
| Globaltec Formation Berhad | MYX: 5220 |
| Globetronics Technology Berhad | MYX: 7022 |
| Glomac Berhad | MYX: 5020 |
| Goh Ban Huat Berhad | MYX: 3611 |
| Golden Land Berhad | MYX: 7382 |
| Golden Pharos Berhad | MYX: 5649 |
| Goldis Berhad | MYX: 5606 |
| Goodway Integrated Industries Berhad | MYX: 7192 |
| Gopeng Berhad | MYX: 2135 |
| GPA Holdings Berhad | MYX: 7096 |
| Grand Central Enterprises Berhad | MYX: 5592 |
| Grand Hoover Berhad | MYX: 7010 |
| Grand-Flo Berhad | MYX: 0056 |
| Green Packet Berhad | MYX: 0082 |
| Greenyield Berhad | MYX: 0136 |
| Gromutual Berhad | MYX: 9962 |
| GSB Group Berhad | MYX: 7077 |
| Guan Chong Berhad | MYX: 5102 |
| Guh Holdings Berhad | MYX: 3247 |
| Gunung Capital Berhad | MYX: 7676 |
| Guocoland (Malaysia) Berhad | MYX: 1503 |

== H ==
| Company name | Stock Code |
|---|---|
| Hai-O Enterprise Berhad | MYX: 7668 |
| Halex Holdings Berhad | MYX: 5151 |
| Handal Resources Berhad | MYX: 7253 |
| Hap Seng Consolidated Berhad | MYX: 3034 |
| Hap Seng Plantations Holdings Berhad | MYX: 5138 |
| Harbour-Link Group Berhad | MYX: 2062 |
| Harn Len Corporation Berhad | MYX: 7501 |
| Harrisons Holdings (Malaysia) Berhad | MYX: 5008 |
| Hartalega Holdings Berhad | MYX: 5168 |
| HB Global Limited | MYX: 5187 |
| HCK Capital Group Berhad | MYX: 7105 |
| Heineken Malaysia Berhad | MYX: 3255 |
| HeiTech Padu Berhad | MYX: 5028 |
| Hektar Real Estate Investment Trust | MYX: 5121 |
| Hengyuan Refining Company Berhad | MYX: 4324 |
| Heveaboard Berhad | MYX: 5095 |
| Hexza Corporation Berhad | MYX: 3298 |
| Hiap Teck Venture Berhad | MYX: 5072 |
| Hibiscus Petroleum Berhad | MYX: 5199 |
| Hil Industries Berhad | MYX: 8443 |
| Ho Hup Construction Company Berhad | MYX: 5169 |
| Ho Wah Genting Berhad | MYX: 9601 |
| Hock Heng Stone Industries Berhad | MYX: 5165 |
| Hock Seng Lee Berhad | MYX: 6238 |
| Homeritz Corporation Berhad | MYX: 5160 |
| Hong Leong Bank Berhad | MYX: 5819 |
| Hong Leong Capital Berhad | MYX: 5274 |
| Hong Leong Financial Group Berhad | MYX: 1082 |
| Hong Leong Industries Berhad | MYX: 3301 |
| Hovid Berhad | MYX: 7213 |
| Hua Yang Berhad | MYX: 5062 |
| Hubline Berhad | MYX: 7013 |
| Hume Industries Berhad | MYX: 5000 |
| Hup Seng Industries Berhad | MYX: 5024 |
| Hwa Tai Industries Berhad | MYX: 8478 |
| Hwang Capital (Malaysia) Berhad | MYX: 6688 |

== I ==
| Company name | Stock Code |
|---|---|
| I-Berhad | MYX: 4251 |
| Ibraco Berhad | MYX: 5084 |
| icapital.biz Berhad | MYX: 5108 |
| Icon Offshore Berhad | MYX: 5255 |
| Ideal United Bintang Berhad | MYX: 9687 |
| IGB Corporation Berhad | MYX: 1597 |
| IGB Real Estate Investment Trust | MYX: 5227 |
| IHH Healthcare Berhad | MYX: 5225 |
| IJM Corporation Berhad | MYX: 3336 |
| IJM Plantations Berhad | MYX: 2216 |
| Ikhmas Jaya Group Berhad | MYX: 5268 |
| IMASPRO Corporation Berhad | MYX: 7222 |
| Inari Amertron Berhad | MYX: 0166 |
| Inch Kenneth Kajang Rubber Public Ltd Co | MYX: 2607 |
| Industronics Berhad | MYX: 9393 |
| Innoprise Plantations Berhad | MYX: 6262 |
| Insas Berhad | MYX: 3379 |
| Integrated Logistics Berhad | MYX: 5614 |
| IOI Corporation Berhad | MYX: 1961 |
| IOI Properties Group Berhad | MYX: 5249 |
| Ipmuda Berhad | MYX: 5673 |
| IQ Group Holdings Berhad | MYX: 5107 |
| Ire-Tex Corporation Berhad | MYX: 7183 |
| IREKA Corporation Berhad | MYX: 8834 |
| Iskandar Waterfront City Berhad | MYX: 1589 |
| Ivory Properties Group Berhad | MYX: 5175 |

== J ==
| Company name | Stock Code |
|---|---|
| Jadi Imaging Holdings Berhad | MYX: 7223 |
| JAKS Resources Berhad | MYX: 4723 |
| Jasa Kita Berhad | MYX: 8648 |
| Java Berhad | MYX: 2747 |
| Jaya Tiasa Holdings Berhad | MYX: 4383 |
| Jaycorp Berhad | MYX: 7152 |
| JcbNext Berhad | MYX: 0058 |
| JCY International Berhad | MYX: 5161 |
| Jerasia Capital Berhad | MYX: 8931 |
| Jiankun International Berhad | MYX: 8923 |
| JKG Land Berhad | MYX: 6769 |
| JMR Conglomeration Berhad | MYX: 7043 |
| Johan Holdings Berhad | MYX: 3441 |
| Johore Tin Berhad | MYX: 7167 |

== K ==
| Company name | Stock Code |
|---|---|
| K-Star Sports Limited | MYX: 5172 |
| K. Seng Seng Corporation Berhad | MYX: 5192 |
| Kamdar Group (M) Berhad | MYX: 8672 |
| Karambunai Corp Berhad | MYX: 3115 |
| Karex Berhad | MYX: 5247 |
| Karyon Industries Berhad | MYX: 0054 |
| Kawan Food Berhad | MYX: 7216 |
| KBES Berhad | MYX: 5079 |
| Keck Seng (Malaysia) Berhad | MYX: 3476 |
| Kein Hing International Berhad | MYX: 7199 |
| Kelington Group Berhad | MYX: 0151 |
| KEN Holdings Berhad | MYX: 7323 |
| Kenanga Investment Bank Berhad | MYX: 6483 |
| Kerjaya Prospek Group Berhad | MYX: 7161 |
| KESM Industries Berhad | MYX: 9334 |
| Key ASIC Berhad | MYX: 0143 |
| Khee San Berhad | MYX: 6203 |
| Khind Holdings Berhad | MYX: 7062 |
| Kia Lim Berhad | MYX: 6211 |
| Kian Joo Can Factory Berhad | MYX: 3522 |
| Kim Hin Industry Berhad | MYX: 5371 |
| Kim Loong Resources Berhad | MYX: 5027 |
| Kimlun Corporation Berhad | MYX: 5171 |
| Kinsteel Berhad | MYX: 5060 |
| KIP Real Estate Investment Trust | MYX: 5280 |
| KKB Engineering Berhad | MYX: 9466 |
| KLCC Property Holdings Berhad | MYX: 5235SS |
| KLCC Real Estate Investment Trust | MYX: 5235SS |
| Kluang Rubber Company (Malaya) Berhad | MYX: 2453 |
| KNM Group Berhad | MYX: 7164 |
| Knusford Berhad | MYX: 5035 |
| Kobay Technology Berhad | MYX: 6971 |
| Komarkcorp Berhad | MYX: 7017 |
| Konsortium Transnasional Berhad | MYX: 4847 |
| Kossan Rubber Industries Berhad | MYX: 7153 |
| Kotra Industries Berhad | MYX: 0002 |
| KPJ Healthcare Berhad | MYX: 5878 |
| KPS Consortium Berhad | MYX: 9121 |
| Kretam Holdings Berhad | MYX: 1996 |
| KSL Holdings Berhad | MYX: 5038 |
| Kuala Lumpur Kepong Berhad | MYX: 2445 |
| Kuantan Floor Mills Berhad | MYX: 8303 |
| KUB Malaysia Berhad | MYX: 6874 |
| Kuchai Development Berhad | MYX: 2186 |
| Kumpulan Fima Berhad | MYX: 6491 |
| Kumpulan H & L High-Tech Berhad | MYX: 7033 |
| Kumpulan Jetson Berhad | MYX: 9083 |
| Kumpulan Perangsang Selangor Berhad | MYX: 5843 |
| Kumpulan Powernet Berhad | MYX: 7130 |
| Kwantas Corporation Berhad | MYX: 6572 |
| KYM Holdings Berhad | MYX: 8362 |

== L ==
| Company name | Stock Code |
|---|---|
| Lafarge Malaysia Berhad | MYX: 3794 |
| Land & General Berhad | MYX: 3174 |
| Landmarks Berhad | MYX: 1643 |
| Latitude Tree Holdings Berhad | MYX: 7006 |
| Lay Hong Berhad | MYX: 9385 |
| LB Aluminium Berhad | MYX: 9326 |
| LBI Capital Berhad | MYX: 8494 |
| LBS Bina Group Berhad | MYX: 5789 |
| LCTH Corporation Berhad | MYX: 5092 |
| Leader Steel Holdings Berhad | MYX: 9881 |
| Lebtech Berhad | MYX: 9628 |
| Lee Swee Kiat Group Berhad | MYX: 8079 |
| Leon Fuat Berhad | MYX: 5232 |
| Leweko Resources Berhad | MYX: 8745 |
| LFE Corporation Berhad | MYX: 7170 |
| Lien Hoe Corporation Berhad | MYX: 3573 |
| Lii Hen Industries Berhad | MYX: 7089 |
| Lingkaran Trans Kota Holdings Berhad | MYX: 6645 |
| Lion Diversified Holdings Berhad | MYX: 2887 |
| Lion Forest Industries Berhad | MYX: 8486 |
| Lion Industries Corporation Berhad | MYX: 4235 |
| London Biscuits Berhad | MYX: 7126 |
| LPI Capital Berhad | MYX: 8621 |
| LTKM Berhad | MYX: 7085 |
| Luster Industries Berhad | MYX: 5068 |
| Luxchem Corporation Berhad | MYX: 5143 |
| Lysaght Galvanized Steel Berhad | MYX: 9199 |

== M ==
| Company name | Stock Code |
|---|---|
| M-Mode Berhad | MYX: 0059 |
| MAA Group Berhad | MYX: 1198 |
| Magna Prima Berhad | MYX: 7617 |
| Magni-Tech Industries Berhad | MYX: 7087 |
| Magnum Berhad | MYX: 3859 |
| Mah Sing Group Berhad | MYX: 8583 |
| Majuperak Holdings Berhad | MYX: 8141 |
| Malakoff Corporation Berhad | MYX: 5264 |
| Malayan Banking Berhad | MYX: 1155 |
| Malayan Flour Mills Berhad | MYX: 3662 |
| Malayan United Industries Berhad | MYX: 3891 |
| Malaysia Airports Holdings Berhad | MYX: 5014 |
| Malaysia Building Society Berhad | MYX: 1171 |
| Malaysia Marine and Heavy Engineering Holdings Berhad | MYX: 5186 |
| Malaysia Pacific Corporation Berhad | MYX: 6548 |
| Malaysia Smelting Corporation Berhad | MYX: 5916 |
| Malaysia Steel Works (KL) Berhad | MYX: 5098 |
| Malaysian Bulk Carriers Berhad | MYX: 5077 |
| Malaysian Pacific Industries Berhad | MYX: 3867 |
| Malaysian Resources Corporation Berhad | MYX: 1651 |
| Malpac Holdings Berhad | MYX: 4936 |
| Malton Berhad | MYX: 6181 |
| Manulife Holdings Berhad | MYX: 1058 |
| Marco Holdings Berhad | MYX: 3514 |
| Master-Pack Group Berhad | MYX: 7029 |
| Matrix Concepts Holdings Berhad | MYX: 5236 |
| Maxis Berhad | MYX: 6012 |
| Maxwell International Holdings Berhad | MYX: 5189 |
| MB World Group Berhad | MYX: 7189 |
| MBM Resources Berhad | MYX: 5983 |
| MCE Holdings Berhad | MYX: 7004 |
| MCT Berhad | MYX: 5182 |
| Meda Inc. Berhad | MYX: 5040 |
| Media Chinese International Limited | MYX: 5090 |
| Media Prima Berhad | MYX: 4502 |
| Mega First Corporation Berhad | MYX: 3069 |
| Melati Ehsan Holdings Berhad | MYX: 5129 |
| Melewar Industrial Group Berhad | MYX: 3778 |
| Menang Corporation (M) Berhad | MYX: 1694 |
| Mentiga Corporation Berhad | MYX: 5223 |
| Mercury Industries Berhad | MYX: 8192 |
| Merge Energy Berhad | MYX: 5006 |
| MESB Berhad | MYX: 7234 |
| Mesiniaga Berhad | MYX: 5011 |
| Metrod Holdings Berhad | MYX: 6149 |
| Metronic Global Berhad | MYX: 0043 |
| MHC Plantations Berhad | MYX: 5026 |
| Mieco Chipboard Berhad | MYX: 5001 |
| Milux Corporation Berhad | MYX: 7935 |
| Minetech Resources Berhad | MYX: 7219 |
| Minho (M) Berhad | MYX: 5576 |
| Mintye Berhad | MYX: 5886 |
| MISC Berhad | MYX: 3816 |
| Mitrajaya Holdings Berhad | MYX: 9571 |
| MK Land Holdings Berhad | MYX: 8893 |
| MKH Berhad | MYX: 6114 |
| ML Global Berhad | MYX: 7595 |
| MMC Corporation Berhad | MYX: 2194 |
| MNRB Holdings Berhad | MYX: 6459 |
| MPHB Capital Berhad | MYX: 5237 |
| MRCB-Quill REIT Berhad | MYX: 5123 |
| MSM Malaysia Holdings Berhad | MYX: 5202 |
| MTD ACPI Engineering Berhad | MYX: 5924 |
| Muar Ban Lee Group Berhad | MYX: 5152 |
| Muda Holdings Berhad | MYX: 3883 |
| Mudajaya Group Berhad | MYX: 5085 |
| Muhibbah Engineering (M) Berhad | MYX: 5703 |
| MUI Properties Berhad | MYX: 3913 |
| Mulpha International Berhad | MYX: 3905 |
| Multi Sports Holdings Berhad | MYX: 5150 |
| Multi-Usage Holdings Berhad | MYX: 9539 |
| MWE Holdings Berhad | MYX: 3921 |
| My E.G. Services Berhad | MYX: 0138 |
| Mycron Steel Berhad | MYX: 5087 |

== N ==
| Company name | Stock Code |
|---|---|
| Naim Holdings Berhad | MYX: 5073 |
| Naim Indah Corporation Berhad | MYX: 4464 |
| Nakamichi Corporation Berhad | MYX: 7002 |
| Nationwide Express Holdings Berhad | MYX: 9806 |
| Negri Sembilan Oil Palms Berhad | MYX: 2038 |
| Nestle (Malaysia) Berhad | MYX: 4707 |
| New Hoong Fatt Holdings Berhad | MYX: 7060 |
| Ni Hsin Resources Berhad | MYX: 7215 |
| Niche Capital Emas Holdings Berhad | MYX: 7139 |
| Notion VTec Berhad | MYX: 0083 |
| NPC Resources Berhad | MYX: 5047 |
| NTPM Holdings Berhad | MYX: 5066 |
| NWP Holdings Berhad | MYX: 5025 |
| Nylex (Malaysia) Berhad | MYX: 4944 |

== O ==
| Company name | Stock Code |
|---|---|
| O&C Resources Berhad | MYX: 7071 |
| OCB Berhad | MYX: 5533 |
| OCK Group Berhad | MYX: 0172 |
| OKA Corporation Berhad | MYX: 7140 |
| Oldtown Berhad | MYX: 5201 |
| Olympia Industries Berhad | MYX: 3018 |
| Omesti Berhad | MYX: 9008 |
| Only World Group Holdings Berhad | MYX: 5260 |
| Oriental Food Industries Holdings Berhad | MYX: 7107 |
| Oriental Holdings Berhad | MYX: 4006 |
| Oriental Interest Berhad | MYX: 5827 |
| Ornapaper Berhad | MYX: 5065 |
| OSK Holdings Berhad | MYX: 5053 |

== P ==
| Company name | Stock Code |
|---|---|
| P.A. Resources Berhad | MYX: 7225 |
| P.I.E. Industrial Berhad | MYX: 7095 |
| Pacific & Orient Berhad | MYX: 6009 |
| Padini Holdings Berhad | MYX: 7052 |
| Pan Malaysia Corporation Berhad | MYX: 4081 |
| Pan Malaysia Holdings Berhad | MYX: 1287 |
| Panasonic Manufacturing Malaysia Berhad | MYX: 3719 |
| Panpages Berhad | MYX: 0041 |
| Pansar Berhad | MYX: 8419 |
| Pantech Group Holdings Berhad | MYX: 5125 |
| Paos Holdings Berhad | MYX: 5022 |
| Paragon Union Berhad | MYX: 9407 |
| Paramount Corporation Berhad | MYX: 1724 |
| Parkson Holdings Berhad | MYX: 5657 |
| Pasdec Holdings Berhad | MYX: 6912 |
| Pavilion Real Estate Investment Trust | MYX: 5212 |
| PBA Holdings Berhad | MYX: 5041 |
| PCCS Group Berhad | MYX: 6068 |
| PDZ Holdings Berhad | MYX: 6254 |
| Pecca Group Berhad | MYX: 5271 |
| Pelangi Publishing Group Berhad | MYX: 7190 |
| Pelikan International Corporation Berhad | MYX: 5231 |
| Pensonic Holdings Berhad | MYX: 9997 |
| Pentamaster Corporation Berhad | MYX: 7160 |
| Perak Corporation Berhad | MYX: 8346 |
| Perdana Petroleum Berhad | MYX: 7108 |
| Perisai Petroleum Teknologi Berhad | MYX: 0047 |
| Permaju Industries Berhad | MYX: 7080 |
| Perwaja Holdings Berhad | MYX: 5146 |
| Pesona Metro Holdings Berhad | MYX: 8311 |
| Pestech International Berhad | MYX: 5219 |
| Petaling Tin Berhad | MYX: 2208 |
| Petra Energy Berhad | MYX: 5133 |
| Petrol One Resources Berhad | MYX: 7027 |
| Petron Malaysia Refining & Marketing Berhad | MYX: 3042 |
| Petronas Chemicals Group Berhad | MYX: 5183 |
| Petronas Dagangan Berhad | MYX: 5681 |
| Petronas Gas Berhad | MYX: 6033 |
| Pharmaniaga Berhad | MYX: 7081 |
| Pinehill Pacific Berhad | MYX: 1902 |
| Pintaras Jaya Berhad | MYX: 9598 |
| PJBumi Berhad | MYX: 7163 |
| PLB Engineering Berhad | MYX: 7055 |
| Plenitude Berhad | MYX: 5075 |
| PLS Plantations Berhad | MYX: 9695 |
| PMB Technology Berhad | MYX: 7172 |
| PNE PCB Berhad | MYX: 6637 |
| Poh Huat Resources Holdings Berhad | MYX: 7088 |
| Poh Kong Holdings Berhad | MYX: 5080 |
| Poly Glass Fibre (M) Berhad | MYX: 8117 |
| Pos Malaysia Berhad | MYX: 4634 |
| Power Root Berhad | MYX: 7237 |
| PPB Group Berhad | MYX: 4065 |
| Premier Nalfin Berhad | MYX: 9458 |
| Press Metal Berhad | MYX: 8869 |
| Prestar Resources Berhad | MYX: 9873 |
| AwanBiru Technology Berhad | MYX: 5204 |
| PRG Holdings Berhad | MYX: 7168 |
| Priceworth International Berhad | MYX: 7123 |
| Prinsiptek Corporation Berhad | MYX: 7145 |
| Progressive Impact Corporation Berhad | MYX: 7201 |
| Prolexus Berhad | MYX: 8966 |
| Protasco Berhad | MYX: 5070 |
| Perusahaan Sadur Timah Malaysia (Perstima) Berhad | MYX: 5436 |
| Public Bank Berhad | MYX: 1295 |
| Public Packages Holdings Berhad | MYX: 8273 |
| Puncak Niaga Holdings Berhad | MYX: 6807 |
| PWF Consolidated Berhad | MYX: 7134 |

== Q ==
| Company name | Stock Code |
|---|---|
| QL Resources Berhad | MYX: 7084 |
| Quality Concrete Holdings Berhad | MYX: 7544 |

== R ==
| Company name | Stock Code |
|---|---|
| Ralco Corporation Berhad | MYX: 7498 |
| Ranhill Holdings Berhad | MYX: 5272 |
| Rapid Synergy Berhad | MYX: 7765 |
| RCE Capital Berhad | MYX: 9296 |
| Reach Energy Berhad | MYX: 5256 |
| Red Sena Berhad | MYX: 5270 |
| Reliance Pacific Berhad | MYX: 8885 |
| Resintech Berhad | MYX: 7232 |
| Rex Industry Berhad | MYX: 9946 |
| RGB International Berhad | MYX: 0037 |
| RHB Bank Berhad | MYX: 1066 |
| Rhone Ma Holdings Berhad | MYX: 5278 |
| Rimbunan Sawit Berhad | MYX: 5113 |
| Riverview Rubber Estates Berhad | MYX: 2542 |
| Rohas Tecnic Berhad | MYX: 9741 |
| Rubberex Corporation (M) Berhad | MYX: 7803 |

== S ==
| Company name | Stock Code |
|---|---|
| Salcon Berhad | MYX: 8567 |
| Salutica Berhad | MYX: 0183 |
| SAM Engineering & Equipment (M) Berhad | MYX: 9822 |
| Samchem Holdings Berhad | MYX: 5147 |
| Sanbumi Holdings Berhad | MYX: 9113 |
| Sand Nisko Capital Berhad | MYX: 7943 |
| Sapura Energy Berhad | MYX: 5218 |
| Sapura Industrial Berhad | MYX: 7811 |
| Sapura Resources Berhad | MYX: 4596 |
| Sarawak Cable Berhad | MYX: 5170 |
| Sarawak Consolidated Industries Berhad | MYX: 9237 |
| Sarawak Oil Palms Berhad | MYX: 5126 |
| Sarawak Plantation Berhad | MYX: 5135 |
| Sasbadi Holdings Berhad | MYX: 5252 |
| Saudee Group Berhad | MYX: 5157 |
| SBC Corporation Berhad | MYX: 5207 |
| Scanwolf Corporation Berhad | MYX: 7239 |
| SCGM Berhad | MYX: 7247 |
| Scicom (MSC) Berhad | MYX: 0099 |
| Scientex Berhad | MYX: 4731 |
| Scomi Energy Services Berhad | MYX: 7045 |
| Scomi Engineering Berhad | MYX: 7366 |
| Scomi Group Berhad | MYX: 7158 |
| Seacera Group Berhad | MYX: 7073 |
| Seal Incorporated Berhad | MYX: 4286 |
| Sealink International Berhad | MYX: 5145 |
| See Hup Consolidated Berhad | MYX: 7053 |
| SEG International Berhad | MYX: 9792 |
| Selangor Dredging Berhad | MYX: 2224 |
| Selangor Properties Berhad | MYX: 1783 |
| Seni Jaya Corporation Berhad | MYX: 9431 |
| Sentoria Group Berhad | MYX: 5213 |
| Serba Dinamik Holdings Berhad | MYX: 5279 |
| Seremban Engineering Berhad | MYX: 5163 |
| Sern Kou Resources Berhad | MYX: 7180 |
| Shangri-La Hotels (Malaysia) Berhad | MYX: 5517 |
| SHH Resources Holdings Berhad | MYX: 7412 |
| Shin Yang Shipping Corporation Berhad | MYX: 5173 |
| SHL Consolidated Berhad | MYX: 6017 |
| SIG Gases Berhad | MYX: 5181 |
| Signature International Berhad | MYX: 7246 |
| Silk Holdings Berhad | MYX: 5078 |
| Sime Darby Berhad | MYX: 4197 |
| Sin Heng Chan (Malaya) Berhad | MYX: 4316 |
| Sino Hua-An International Berhad | MYX: 2739 |
| Sinotop Holdings Berhad | MYX: 8532 |
| SKB Shutters Corporation Berhad | MYX: 7115 |
| SKP Resources Berhad | MYX: 7155 |
| SLP Resources Berhad | MYX: 7248 |
| SMIS Corporation Berhad | MYX: 7132 |
| Solid Automotive Berhad | MYX: 5242 |
| Sona Petroleum Berhad | MYX: 5241 |
| South Malaysia Industries Berhad | MYX: 4375 |
| Southern Acids (M) Berhad | MYX: 5134 |
| Southern Steel Berhad | MYX: 5665 |
| S P Setia Berhad | MYX: 8664 |
| Spring Gallery Berhad | MYX: 7165 |
| Spritzer Berhad | MYX: 7103 |
| Star Media Group Berhad | MYX: 6084 |
| Stone Master Corporation Berhad | MYX: 7143 |
| Subur Tiasa Holdings Berhad | MYX: 6904 |
| Success Transformer Corporation Berhad | MYX: 7207 |
| Suiwah Corporation Berhad | MYX: 9865 |
| Sumatec Resources Berhad | MYX: 1201 |
| Sungei Bagan Rubber Company (Malaya) Berhad | MYX: 2569 |
| Sunsuria Berhad | MYX: 3743 |
| Sunway Berhad | MYX: 5211 |
| Sunway Construction Group Berhad | MYX: 5263 |
| Sunway Real Estate Investment Trust | MYX: 5176 |
| Superlon Holdings Berhad | MYX: 7235 |
| Supermax Corporation Berhad | MYX: 7106 |
| Suria Capital Holdings Berhad | MYX: 6521 |
| SWS Capital Berhad | MYX: 7186 |
| Syarikat Takaful Malaysia Berhad | MYX: 6139 |
| Sycal Ventures Berhad | MYX: 9717 |
| SYF Resources Berhad | MYX: 7082 |
| Symphony Life Berhad | MYX: 1538 |

== T ==
| Company name | Stock Code |
|---|---|
| T7 Global Berhad | MYX: 7228 |
| Ta Ann Holdings Berhad | MYX: 5012 |
| TA Enterprise Berhad | MYX: 4898 |
| TA Global Berhad | MYX: 5158 |
| Ta Win Holdings Berhad | MYX: 7097 |
| Tadmax Resources Berhad | MYX: 4022 |
| Tafi Industries Berhad | MYX: 7211 |
| TAHPS Group Berhad | MYX: 2305 |
| Talam Transform Berhad | MYX: 2259 |
| Taliworks Corporation Berhad | MYX: 8524 |
| Tambun Indah Land Berhad | MYX: 5191 |
| Tan Chong Motor Holdings Berhad | MYX: 4405 |
| Tanco Holdings Berhad | MYX: 2429 |
| Tas Offshore Berhad | MYX: 5149 |
| TASCO Berhad | MYX: 5140 |
| Tasek Corporation Berhad | MYX: 4448 |
| Tatt Giap Group Berhad | MYX: 5178 |
| TDM Berhad | MYX: 2054 |
| Teck Guan Perdana Berhad | MYX: 7439 |
| Tek Seng Holdings Berhad | MYX: 7200 |
| Tekala Corporation Berhad | MYX: 6378 |
| Telekom Malaysia Berhad | MYX: 4863 |
| Tenaga Nasional Berhad | MYX: 5347 |
| Teo Guan Lee Corporation Berhad | MYX: 9369 |
| Teo Seng Capital Berhad | MYX: 7252 |
| Texchem Resources Berhad | MYX: 8702 |
| TH Heavy Engineering Berhad | MYX: 7206 |
| TH Plantations Berhad | MYX: 5112 |
| Theta Edge Berhad | MYX: 9075 |
| Thong Guan Industries Berhad | MYX: 7034 |
| Three-A Resources Berhad | MYX: 0012 |
| Thriven Global Berhad | MYX: 7889 |
| Tien Wah Press Holdings Berhad | MYX: 7374 |
| Tiger Synergy Berhad | MYX: 7079 |
| Timberwell Berhad | MYX: 7854 |
| TIME dotCom Berhad | MYX: 5031 |
| Tiong Nam Logistics Holdings Berhad | MYX: 8397 |
| Titijaya Land Berhad | MYX: 5239 |
| TMC Life Sciences Berhad | MYX: 0101 |
| Tomei Consolidated Berhad | MYX: 7230 |
| Tomypak Holdings Berhad | MYX: 7285 |
| Tong Herr Resources Berhad | MYX: 5010 |
| Top Glove Corporation Berhad | MYX: 7113 |
| Tower Real Estate Investment Trust | MYX: 5111 |
| Toyo Ink Group Berhad | MYX: 7173 |
| TPC Plus Berhad | MYX: 7176 |
| Transocean Holdings Berhad | MYX: 7218 |
| TRC Synergy Berhad | MYX: 5054 |
| TRIplc Berhad | MYX: 5622 |
| Trive Property Group Berhad | MYX: 0118 |
| Tropicana Corporation Berhad | MYX: 5401 |
| TSH Resources Berhad | MYX: 9059 |
| TSR Capital Berhad | MYX: 5042 |
| Tune Protect Group Berhad | MYX: 5230 |
| Turbo-Mech Berhad | MYX: 5167 |
| Turiya Berhad | MYX: 4359 |

== U ==
| Company name | Stock Code |
|---|---|
| Uchi Technologies Berhad | MYX: 7100 |
| UEM Edgenta Berhad | MYX: 1368 |
| UEM Sunrise Berhad | MYX: 5148 |
| UMS Holdings Berhad | MYX: 7137 |
| UMS-Neiken Group Berhad | MYX: 7227 |
| UMW Holdings Berhad | MYX: 4588 |
| UMW Oil & Gas Corporation Berhad | MYX: 5243 |
| Unimech Group Berhad | MYX: 7091 |
| Unisem (M) Berhad | MYX: 5005 |
| United Malacca Berhad | MYX: 2593 |
| United Plantations Berhad | MYX: 2089 |
| United U-Li Corporation Berhad | MYX: 7133 |
| UOA Development Berhad | MYX: 5200 |
| UOA Real Estate Investment Trust | MYX: 5110 |
| UPA Corporation Berhad | MYX: 7757 |
| Utusan Melayu (Malaysia) Berhad | MYX: 5754 |
| Uzma Berhad | MYX: 7250 |

== V ==
| Company name | Stock Code |
|---|---|
| V.S. Industry Berhad | MYX: 6963 |
| Versatile Creative Berhad | MYX: 4995 |
| Vitrox Corporation Berhad | MYX: 0097 |
| Vizione Holdings Berhad | MYX: 7070 |
| Voir Holdings Berhad | MYX: 7240 |

== W ==
| Company name | Stock Code |
|---|---|
| Wah Seong Corporation Berhad | MYX: 5142 |
| Wang-Zheng Berhad | MYX: 7203 |
| Warisan TC Holdings Berhad | MYX: 5016 |
| Watta Holding Berhad | MYX: 7226 |
| WCE Holdings Berhad | MYX: 3565 |
| WCT Holdings Berhad | MYX: 9679 |
| Weida (M) Berhad | MYX: 7111 |
| Wellcall Holdings Berhad | MYX: 7231 |
| Westports Holdings Berhad | MYX: 5246 |
| White Horse Berhad | MYX: 5009 |
| Widetech (Malaysia) Berhad | MYX: 7692 |
| Willowglen MSC Berhad | MYX: 0008 |
| Wing Tai Malaysia Berhad | MYX: 2976 |
| Wong Engineering Corporation Berhad | MYX: 7050 |
| Woodlandor Holdings Berhad | MYX: 7025 |
| WTK Holdings Berhad | MYX: 4243 |
| WZ Satu Berhad | MYX: 7245 |

== X ==
| Company name | Stock Code |
|---|---|
| Xian Leng Holdings Berhad | MYX: 7121 |
| Xidelang Holding Ltd | MYX: 5156 |
| Xin Hwa Holdings Berhad | MYX: 5267 |
| Xingquan International Sports Holdings Limited | MYX: 5155 |

== Y ==
| Company name | Stock Code |
|---|---|
| Y&G Corporation Berhad | MYX: 7003 |
| Y.S.P. Southeast Asia Holding Berhad | MYX: 7178 |
| Yee Lee Corporation Berhad | MYX: 5584 |
| Yen Global Berhad | MYX: 7184 |
| YFG Berhad | MYX: 7122 |
| Yi-Lai Berhad | MYX: 5048 |
| Yinson Holdings Berhad | MYX: 7293 |
| YKGI Holdings Berhad | MYX: 7020 |
| YLI Holdings Berhad | MYX: 7014 |
| YNH Property Berhad | MYX: 3158 |
| Yong Tai Berhad | MYX: 7066 |
| Yoong Onn Corporation Berhad | MYX: 5159 |
| YTL Corporation Berhad | MYX: 4677 |
| YTL Hospitality REIT | MYX: 5109 |
| YTL Land & Development Berhad | MYX: 2577 |
| YTL Power International Berhad | MYX: 6742 |

== Z ==
| Company name | Stock Code |
|---|---|
| Zecon Berhad | MYX: 7028 |
| Zelan Berhad | MYX: 2283 |
| Zhulian Corporation Berhad | MYX: 5131 |
