= Tang Siu Hau discography =

- EPs: 3
- Singles: 19

Tang Siu Hau is a Hong Kong female singer who had released 3 extended plays throughout her career.

== Extended plays ==
#	Info	Track listing
1st	The Strength of Weakness: Released：December 13, 2016; Genre: Cantopop; Label: Asia Media; Frenzi Music	CD: Elegant; Vanconin; Absurd; The Strength of Weakness (2016 Remastered Edition); Without Medication
2nd	Inner Voice: Released：February 9, 2018; Genre: Cantopop; Label: Asia Media; Frenzi Music	CD: 兩溝 Mixology; 心靈作家 Soul Writer; 可惜你是個人 Beautifully Different; 將沙拋給一片海; 和好 Inner Child
3rd	No Coincidence: Released：March 5, 2019; Genre: Cantopop; Label: Asia Media; Frenzi Music	CD: 芭樂 Ballad; 四大發明 4 Great Inventions; 重陽 Chung Yeung; 雲吞 Wonton; 芭樂 Ballad (Rock Edition)
4th	Obsessions: Released：November 29, 2019; Genre: Cantopop; Label: Asia Media; Frenzi Music	CD: 迂腐 Rotten; 香檳女狼 Champagne Lady; 精神餵飼 Mental Feeding; 無神論 Atheism; 原罪 Guilty

== Charted singles ==
Year	Single	Peak positions						Album
Year	Single	CRHK Ultimate 903	RTHK Chinese Pop Chart	Metro Radio Pop Chart 997	JSG Billboard (TVB)	DBC Chart	Canadian Hits	Album
2010	Supervoice	19	-	-	2	-	-	The Voice
2010	半杯水 Half A Cup of Water	-	-	-	-	-	-	The Voice
2015	Elegant	2	1	-	2	4	-	The Strength of Weakness
2016	Vanconin	2	7	13	-	8	-	The Strength of Weakness
2016	The Strength of Weakness	2	3	3	7	-	-	The Strength of Weakness
2016	Absurd	10	15	2	-	-	-	The Strength of Weakness
2017	Without Medication	5	16	5	-	-	-	The Strength of Weakness
2017	兩溝 Mixology	6	7	2	-	-	-	Inner Voice
2017	心靈作家 Soul Writer	19	16	3	-	-	-	Inner Voice
2017	可惜你是個人 Beautifully Different	8	6	8	-	-	6	Inner Voice
2018	和好 Inner Child	1	1	1	1	-	3	Inner Voice
2018	我們的航海時代	12	-	-	-	-	6	Non-album single
2018	將沙拋給一片海	14	2	-	-	-	8	Inner Voice
2018	芭樂 Ballad	2	3	5	-	-	1	No Coincidence
2018	四大發明 4 Great Inventions	2	15	3	-	-	10	No Coincidence
2018	重陽 Chung Yeung	20	3	3	-	-	19	No Coincidence
2019	雲吞 Wonton	1	1	1	-	-	6	No Coincidence
2019	精神餵飼 Feed	1	10	2	-	-	3	TBA
2019	迂腐 Rotten	-	-	-	-	-	-	TBA

=== As a featuring artist ===
Title	English Title	Date	Artist	Album	Label	Ref.
想怎樣	What Do You Want	9 June 2015	Robynn & Kendy ft. Rocky Chan	如果·我不完美 If I Am Not Perfect	Universal Music	
莉亞的C3PO	Leah's C3PO	6 March 2017	Hacken Lee	30克	Emperor Entertainment Group	
POOR U	POOR U	9 September 2017	Vicky Fung ft. Sophy Wong	繼續彳亍 Continue To Walk	Frenzi Music Limited	

=== Non-album singles ===
Title	Date	Note
未知數 Unknown	14 July 2016	Released by Music Nation Records Company Limited
水療 The Therapy	4 May 2017	

== Other appearance ==
Album Info	Track listing
The Voice(Compilation Album): Released Date：4 November 2010	CD: 1. Supervoice (w/ Cherry Ho, Stephanie Ho, Lok Yan Ming, Auston Lam, Daniel Chau, Alfred Hui, Ryan Wong); 2. 半杯水 Half A Cup of Water
