= Bright Packaging =

Global Packaging Company

Bright Packaging Industry Berhad
- Type: Public limited company
- Traded as: MYX: 9938
- ISIN: MYL9938OO001
- Industry: Packaging, Manufacturing, Printing
- Founded: 1988
- Headquarters: Shah Alam, Malaysia
- Key people: Syed Ali Alhabshee, Chairman; Yap Kok Eng, Executive Director
- Products: Aluminium foil, Lamination, Printing
- Revenue: 52.2 million(August 2013)
- Number of employees: 90
- Website: www.brightpack.net

Bright Packaging Industry Berhad (MYX: 9938) is a global FMCG (fast-moving consumer goods) packaging company and manufacturer of aluminium foil laminate serving the tobacco, liquor and confectionery markets. It is headquartered in Shah Alam, Malaysia

== History ==
Bright Packaging Industry was incorporated as a private limited company in Malaysia 1988. The Company went public on 25 October 1995 when it was listed in the then Second Board of the Kuala Lumpur Stock Exchange. Today, Bright Packaging Industry is listed on the Main Board of Bursa Malaysia. The core business has been the lamination of aluminium foil onto paper and paperboard for the packaging of FMCG products.

== Operations ==
The company supplies packaging products to Philip Morris, Unilever, Procter and Gamble and British American Tobacco. Its products include aluminium foil, metalised film laminate, tissue/woodfree/board, and inner frames, which are primarily used in cigarette, liquor, confectionery, and pharmaceutical packaging. It is also involved in property investment activities. The company's manufacturing plant is located in Subang Hi-Tech Industrial Park. Bright Packaging supplies the tobacco, confectionery and pharmaceutical industries resulting in being a hidden nonetheless critical component of its clients supply chain and product image.

== Boardroom dispute ==
Bright Packaging was embroiled in a high-profile boardroom dispute culminating in a call for an extraordinary general meeting and the replacement of four directors in a hostile takeover. The company dominated headlines for six months due to the hostile and public nature of the dispute in Malaysia – a country where such corporate disputes are rarely disclosed publicly. In December 2012 a group of shareholders – Ang Lay Chien, Datuk Seri Syed Ali Abbas Alhabshee, Tee Wee Keat and Lye Jun Fei – with a collective 31.2% share requested an extraordinary general meeting (EGM) to remove the existing managing director, Wong See Yaw, as well as Executive Director Yap Kok Eng and independent non-executive directors Wong Siew Yoong and Yeap Cheng Chuan. The board released a press statement on 14 January 2013 stating: “it would seem (the proposed directors) have very little or no knowledge of (Bright Packaging’s) current business”. News of a change in board drove share prices to a ten-year high of $2.10. Following the call for the EGM, Bright Packaging's board announced a five-year, 100% dividend payout policy to demonstrate its commitment to its shareholders. Requisitionists responded that the company had no history of paying dividends in the past decade and the move was a desperate attempt by the board to buy votes. Activist shareholders added that a 100% payout policy is unrealistic and puts the company in an unsustainable position by eliminating any prospects of growth On 1 January 2013, Bursa Malaysia Securities questioned Bright Packaging over unusual market activity following a sharp rise in the company's share price. Bright Packaging responded that it was unaware of any reason except the notice of requisition for an EGM and the proposed first and final dividend payment for the financial year ended 31 August 2012. Following Bursa Malaysia's query, Bright Packaging's shares fell 7.62%.

=== Controversy ===
Shareholders approached the Minority Shareholders Watchdog Group (MSWG), who agreed to help protect Bright's minority shareholders’ interests at the EGM, held on 21 February 2013. The minority shareholders requested Bright Packaging appoint an independent auditor to conduct a special audit on the company, and also for the board to explain why long-standing auditors Ernst & Young were replaced in 2012. Shareholders were concerned about accounting irregularities and cashflow deficiency: according to Bright Packaging's filings to the stock exchange, the company posted profit of $2.7 million in 2011, of which 1.15 million stemmed from disposal of assets. Shareholders also wanted the audit to ensure the board was executing its fiduciary duty and acted in the company's best interest given concerns of related party transactions involving the CEO and a related company, although the board explained the monies involved were interest-free advances given to Bright Packaging by its major shareholders when the company was making a loss.

Bright Packaging refuted the allegations of poor corporate governance and stated in a press release: “the board views these dramatised baseless allegations by the concerned minority shareholders as an act to discredit the directors and also to drum up support for the requisitionists to remove certain directors.” The company assured that Ernst & Young had been replaced due to a fee revision that the board rejected, and agreed to an independent audit. Following a five-month audit from 1 September 2012 by Crowe Horwath, the company was given a clean sheet except for two items: qualifications on non-inclusion of an asset, and non-compliance to an accounting standard, which had no impact on the financial statement for the period ended 31 January 2013. Baker Tilly Monteiro Heng was appointed as scrutineer for the EGM, and in a letter to Bright Packaging, Baker Tilly explained that their role would be "scrutinizing, sorting and verifying the voting slips, counting the votes, certifying the results of the poll and preparation of a report of the outcome of the EGM to the Chairman of the Meeting."

=== Hostile takeover ===
Of the six directors, four were removed in the EGM by a majority vote of 59.93%. Shareholders voted to retain two existing directors — chairman Nik Mustapha Muhamad and independent director Low Wan Choon. Following the EGM, the ousted management began liquidating their holdings. News of changeover on the board drove share price two cents higher to close at $2.09. In April, the new directors scrapped the 100% dividend payout, with the explanation that the profits would be put back into the company for future growth.

=== Activist investor ===
On 10 February 2014, non-executive director Datuk Seri Syed Ali Alhabshee has ceased to be a substantial shareholder of the company following the disposal of his entire shareholding in a direct business transaction to Dato' Ricky Wong. Dato' Ricky currently holds a 32.81% stake in Bright Packaging.

Datuk Seri Syed Ali Alhabshee with 9.24% voting shares led dissident shareholders to victory by a landslide margin with 59.93% voting in favour to oust the incumbent board at the EGM. Following the boardroom tussle, Luxembourg-based SICAV Halley Asian Prosperity hedge fund emerged as Bright Packaging Industry Bhd's third largest shareholder in May 2013 In October, renowned activist investor and entrepreneur Dato’ Ricky Wong, founder and CEO of Asia Media Group, bought a dominant stakeholder in Bright Packaging Industry Bhd. In a filing with Bursa Malaysia, Wong purchased a further 360,000 shares, giving him 23.5% of Bright Packaging. Dato' Ricky and Datuk Seri Syed Ali Alhabshee are CEO and chairman of Asia Media respectively.

=== Turnaround ===
After the management shakeup, Bright Packaging reported its strongest quarter in over a decade lifting its year result. It was reported in October 2013 that the company had plans to raise $47 million through a rights issue to double capacity to meet increased demand. The company made a net profit of $2.98 million for the fourth quarter, ended 31 August 2013 – an increase from $1.48 million in the previous corresponding quarter. YoY quarter revenue rose 54.5% to $20.8 million from $13.5 million a year earlier, following higher orders from the local and confectionery industry. Bright Packaging reported a full year profit of $7.3 million, up 86% from $3.8 million in the previous year.

== Recent corporate history ==
Bright Packaging's revenue for the financial year ending 31 August 2013 was $52.2 million. Earnings per share (EPS) for the last quarter was 6.88 cents compared to 3.42 cents for the preceding year's corresponding quarter, raising full-year EPS to 16.24 cents compared to 8.73 cents in 2012. Net assets per share increased to $1.16 compared to $0.62 in the previous year. Net income increased 84% to $7.3 million compared to $3.8 million last year.

Following a capital reduction exercise, Bright Packaging has zero borrowings and proposed to undertake a renounceable rights issues of 86,569,800 new shares on the basis of two for every one existing share held, together with 57,713,200 free detachable warrants on the basis of two warrants for every three rights shares. At the close of acceptance, the total valid acceptances and excess applications received for the Rights Issue of Shares with Warrants was approximately 115.04%, which represents an over-subscription rate of 15.04% Rights Issue of Shares with Warrants has been completed with the listing of 86,569,800 Rights Shares together with 57,713,200 Warrants on the Main Market of Bursa Securities on 23 January 2014. On the first day of trading, its Warrants closed at $0.175 soared 3,400% above its reference price indicating strong investor appetite, as the mother share closed unchanged at $0.575.

News of activist investor Dato' Ricky Wong interest in taking the company private were denied by the Board in its annual general meeting held on 24 February 2014. Wong has quietly built up his stake in the company and currently holds 32.81% which is just short of the 33% threshold required to trigger a mandatory general offer. Shareholders also voted against payment to former directors of the firm who were ousted last year for mismanaging the company which lead to a probe by the Minority Shareholder Watchdog group.

In August 2021, Bright Packaging ventured into the palm oil cultivation industry via a joint venture with Datai Plantations Sdn Bhd. Bright Packaging is investing $5 million through Datai Plantations which is a deemed native status company in the Borneo state of Sarawak that held a joint venture company Datai Pelita Bintangor Sdn Bhd with the Sarawak's state Government in developing an 1,921 hectares of palm oil estate.

== See also ==
- Tetra Pak
