= Symphony Life =

Symphony Life Berhad
- Symphony Life logo
- Formerly: Bolton Berhad
- Company type: Public limited company
- Traded as: MYX: 1538
- ISIN: MYL1538OO007
- Industry: Property development, property management, investment holding, quarrying, construction
- Founded: 1964
- Headquarters: Petaling Jaya, Selangor, Malaysia
- Key people: Azman Yahya, chairman
- Products: Property
- Website: www.symphonylife.my

Symphony Life Berhad (formerly known as Bolton Berhad) (MYX: 1538) is a Bursa Malaysia listed Malaysian property developer. It was incorporated in 1964 (then known as Bolton Properties Limited) and rebranded as Symphony Life Berhad in April 2013.

== Corporate milestone ==
Year	Milestone
1964	Incorporated as a private limited company
1970s	Launched first township development in Klang Valley - Taman Midah, Cheras
1970s	Listed on the Kuala Lumpur Stock Exchange (now Bursa Malaysia Securities)
1980s – 1990s	Diversified into various businesses from food franchising and retailing to quarrying and liquid bulk terminal operations. Also involved in financial services, systems integration, equipment trading, hotel and rental and manufacturing of cement activities, among others
2000	Launched mixed township development in Taman Tasik Prima, Puchong
2001	Launched first high-end development, The Tijani, within the luxurious Bukit Tunku enclave in Kuala Lumpur
2006	Underwent financial housekeeping with returned focus to property development
2008	Ventured into Penang with the launch of Surin condominium in Tanjung Bungah
2010 -2012	Launched first urban rejuvenation development 6 Ceylon in the heart of Kuala Lumpur; Launched the award-winning mixed commercial development The Wharf at Taman Tasik Prima, Puchong; Embarked on first build-then-sell development in Taman Sri Rampai, Setapak; Launched Tijani Ukay, a high-end development bearing the signature Tijani trademark
2013	Rebranded as Symphony Life Berhad

== List of projects ==
Klang Valley

- Arata of Tijani
- Elevia Residences
- Taman Tasik Prima
- The Wharf
- 6 Ceylon: The development of 6 Ceylon began in 2009 and is scheduled for completion in 2013. It is a 33-storey condominium which will feature 215 units with built-up areas ranging from 696 sq ft to 1,555 sq ft.
- Lavender Heights
- Symphony Square
- Tijani Ukay
- Tijani 2 North
- Tijani 2 South
- Tijani Raja Dewa

Penang

- Surin

Langkawi

- Langkawi Fair

Kedah

- Amanjaya
