= Lancaster University Management School =

UK academic institution

Coordinates: 54.009°N 2.786°W

- Type: Business School
- Established: 1969
- Dean: Professor Claire Leitch
- Undergraduates: 2,268
- Postgraduates: 1,231
- Location: Lancaster, United Kingdom
- Campus: Semi-Rural
- Website: http://www.lancaster.ac.uk/lums/

Lancaster University Management School (LUMS) is the business school of Lancaster University in Lancaster, England. The school's history can be traced back to the establishment of departments of marketing and of operational research at the university's foundation in 1964. These and other related departments were organised into the "School of Business and Organizational Studies" in 1969. A full range of subjects are taught, ranging from undergraduate degrees to postgraduate degrees, including executive and full-time MBAs, PhDs and post-experience executive education.

== History ==
Lancaster University was founded in 1964, with departments including marketing and the first department of operational research in Europe. At that time, a deliberate decision was made not to establish a general business school in competition to those being set up in the wake of the Franks report in London and Manchester, and at other universities. However, within five years it was proposed to unify work in marketing, operational research, financial control, systems engineering, relevant parts of economics, computer science (then considered part of mathematics), and politics into a Lancaster Centre for Business Studies. After politics was removed from the plan and a new Department of Organizational Research created, (Note: Lancaster University used Oxford spelling for its department names) this became a reality under the name of the School of Business and Organizational Studies in 1969. In 1974 the name of the school was changed to the School of Management and Organizational Science "to reflect more accurately the school's wide spread of interests in business, commerce, the trade unions and the public services".

The school remained an assembly of largely autonomous departments until Alan Mercer was appointed to a three-year term as chair in 1982. He reorganised the school into the integrated Lancaster University Management School (LUMS) against stiff opposition, transforming it into a cohesive unit. Later, as associate dean for research, he persuaded the departments to make a single submission as LUMS to the 1992 Research Assessment Exercise, resulting in a top-grade of '5' for the school and contributing significantly to moving Lancaster into the top ten UK universities by research rating.

The MBA course was introduced in 1989.

== Campus and facilities ==
Lancaster City Centre

Management School Hub

LUMS is one of the four faculties of Lancaster University and is situated on the university campus, south of the city of Lancaster. The campus consists of a number of new buildings and facilities grouped together near the south end of the campus.

Within the Management School, the Hub area and atrium of the school opened in 2005. The Charles Carter Building opened in 2010 and provides additional teaching and study facilities. The West Pavilion building opened in 2021, providing new lecture theatres, study and teaching space. From 2022, it is home to the Departments of Entrepreneurship and Strategy, Marketing, and Organisation, Work and Technology.

== Partnerships ==
LUMS has worked in partnership with many companies to develop customised executive education. Partners have included: AstraZeneca, BAE Systems, Bass, British Airways, Pilkington, Rexam, Royal & Sun Alliance and Total. The School has worked with many public sector organisations including the NHS and The UK Cabinet Office. Through its Department of Entrepreneurship and Strategy, it also provides business support and knowledge transfer for small and medium enterprises in England's North West region. LUMS was awarded a Small Business Charter Gold Award in 2014.

In 2005, LUMS partnered with Ernst & Young to offer undergraduate degrees in Accounting and Finance, in which students undertake two periods of paid work-experience with Ernst & Young, in preparation for a Chartered Accountant career. Several LUMS postgraduate programmes have modules designed and delivered by employers – these include Accenture, Deloitte, Cisco, IBM and SAP AG.

== Academic profile ==
Seven subject areas exist within the Management School: Accounting and Finance, Economics, Entrepreneurship and Strategy, Management Science, Marketing, Organisation, Work and Technology, and Business and Management.

=== Research ===
In the 2021 Research Excellence Framework (REF), Lancaster University Management School submitted to Unit of Assessment (UoA) 17: Business and Management Studies. LUMS was ranked 1st in the UK for 'research power' - a recognition of breadth and depth of research expertise; equal-first for research environment (both of these rankings were retained from the previous REF in 2014); and 21st for grade point average (GPA).

The School's research focuses around three main pillars: Sustainability; Social Justice; and Innovation in Place. Ten research centres allow researchers from different departments to work together on projects. It hosts the Sir Roland Smith Chair in Strategic Management.

==== Research centres ====
The school contains a number of research centres:

- Centre for Consumption Insights
- Centre for Family Business
- Centre for Financial Econometrics, Asset Markets and Macroeconomic Policy
- Centre for Health Futures
- Centre for Marketing Analytics and Forecasting
- Pentland Centre for Sustainability in Business
- Centre for Practice Theory (in conjunction with the Faculty of Arts and Social Sciences at Lancaster University)
- Centre for Productivity and Efficiency
- Centre for Technological Futures
- Centre for Transport and Logistics

=== Teaching ===
==== Postgraduate study ====
LUMS delivers a range of taught and research courses, catering for continuing students and professional and executive training. Postgraduate students who study at LUMS are automatically made members of Graduate College.

==== Undergraduate study ====
LUMS currently has 2,268 undergraduate students enrolled, all of which will have been assigned to a college of Lancaster University in their first year. Most programmes offer the capability to take part in an industrial placement year. It is argued that such placement- or internship-focused degrees enhance students' employability upon completion of degree programmes.

==== Extra-curricular ====
A range of extra-curricular opportunities exist at LUMS, in addition to those available within Lancaster University. Each year, the School submits a number of teams into the UK IBM Business Challenge and is involved in numerous case competitions.

==== Study abroad and international exchanges ====
Lancaster University has an international exchange programme of which LUMS is an active member. Study Abroad Programmes enable students from one host university or institution to "swap" places with another from an alternative institution so that both may enjoy a new culture, setting, and different approach to learning. Many of the undergraduate programmes at LUMS include the option to study abroad for periods ranging from one term to one year.

=== Reputation and accreditation ===
In 2022, Lancaster University was ranked in the top 15 UK universities in several major national league tables (outlined in table below). LUMS is one of a small group of business schools in the world to have achieved triple accreditation by the leading international business school accreditation organisations:

- AACSB (USA)
- EQUIS (Europe)
- AMBA (UK)

It also holds a Small Business Charter award from the Chartered Association of Business Schools, and was awarded an Athena Swan Bronze award in 2021, in recognition of its commitment to advancing gender equality.

==== Lancaster University Management School Rankings ====
Ranking	Place	Year
Research Excellence Framework (REF)	1st in UK for Research Power; =1st in UK for Research Environment (Business and Management Studies)	2021
Financial Times Global MBA Ranking	8th in the UK; 21st in Europe; =76th Globally	2022
Financial Times Executive MBA Global Ranking	9th in the UK; =76th Globally	2023
The Economist Which MBA?	10th in the UK, 89th Globally	2022
The Economist Which MBA? (Executive MBA)	5th in the UK, 59th Globally	2020
QS Global MBA rankings	12th in UK, 41st in Europe	2023
QS Global Executive MBA rankings	75th Globally; 30th in Europe; 10th in the UK	2022
Financial Times Global Master's in Finance (Pre-Experience)	9th in the UK; 46th in the World	2023
QS Business Master's Rankings	Master's in Marketing 39th Globally, 9th in UK; Master's in Business Analytics 26th in Europe, 8th in UK; Master's in Finance 65th Globally, 10th in UK; Master's in Management 70th Globally, 13th in UK.	2024

==== Awards ====
Silver award for Lancaster University researcher at STEM for Britain contest.

== Notable alumni ==
Name	Programme of Study	Year	Current Status
Antony Burgmans	MA Marketing	1971	Chairman – Unilever
Gillian Merron	BSc Management Science	1980	Held an MP seat for Lincolnshire and Minister of State for Public Health until May 2010.
Nahed Taher	PhD Economics	2001	Founder and CEO – Gulf One Investment Bank
Ricky Wong	BA Accounting & Finance	2002	CEO – Asia Media
Richard Allinson	BSc Economics	1980	BBC Radio 2 Broadcaster
Richard Cousins	MSc Operational Research	1981	CEO – Compass Group
Rob Holden	BA Economics	1977	Former CEO – Crossrail (till 2011)
Randall Zindler	MBA	1999	CEO – Medair
Gian Fulgoni	MA Marketing	1970	Founder & chairman – ComScore
John C. Hull	MA Operational Research	1969	Professor of Derivatives & Risk Management – University of Toronto
W. Brian Arthur	MA Operational Research	1967	Economist – Santa Fe Institute & Stanford University
Rainer Hersch	BA Economics	1985	Comedian
Ruth Dianne Hines	PhD Accounting	1994	Accounting academic, poet, and children's author
Collette Roche	BBA Management	1997	Chief Operating Officer at Manchester United Football Club
