= MESDAQ =

MESDAQ (Malaysian Exchange of Securities Dealing and Automated Quotation) was a Malaysian securities market, mostly for listing technology-based companies and was part of Bursa Malaysia. It was launched on 6 October 1997.

Among the companies listed on MESDAQ in its early days include Viztel, Greenpacket, Jobstreet and others. The MESDAQ has since changed to the ACE Market.
