= Xin Hwa Holdings =

Xin Hwa Holdings Berhad
- Company type: Public limited company
- Traded as: MYX: 5267
- ISIN: MYL5267OO009
- Industry: Logistics
- Founded: 18 January 2013
- Headquarters: No.2, Jalan Permatang 2, Kempas Baru, 81200 Johor Bahru, Johor, Malaysia
- Key people: Suleiman Mohamed, Chairman; Ng Aik Chuan, Managing Director
- Website: www.xinhwa.com.my

Xin Hwa Holdings Berhad (MYX: 5267) is a Malaysian publicly traded company. It provides logistics services in Malaysia and Singapore.

== Subsidiaries ==
- Xin Hwa Trading & Transport Sdn Bhd
- Xin Hwa Auto Engineering Sdn Bhd
- Canggih Logistik Sdn Bhd
- XH Universal Forwarding Sdn Bhd
- Xin Hwa Integrated Logistics Pte Ltd
