= Nahed =

Nahed is a given name. Notable people with the name include:

- Nahed El Sebai (born 1987), Egyptian actress
- Nahed Hattar (1960–2016), Jordanian writer
- Nahed Sherif (1942–1981), Egyptian actress
- Nahed Taher, Saudi businesswoman
- Nahed Yousri (born 1949), Egyptian actress
