= Ricky Wong (Malaysian businessman) =

Malaysian businessman

- Born: Wong Shee Kai; 12 December 1981 (age 44); Kuala Lumpur, Malaysia
- Education: Bachelor of Arts
- Alma mater: Lancaster University
- Occupations: CEO, Asia Media
- Website: asiamedia.net.my

Ricky Wong Shee Kai (born 12 December 1981 in Kuala Lumpur) is a Malaysian investor, entrepreneur and philanthropist. He is the former CEO and founder of Asia Media, Malaysia's largest Transit-TV network operator. He was honoured as a Young Global Leader by the World Economic Forum, Davos in 2014.

== Biography ==
Wong attended Chong Hwa Independent High School, Kuala Lumpur. He obtained a Bachelor of Arts in Accounting and Finance from Lancaster University Management School. Wong practised accounting briefly in the United Kingdom before returning to Malaysia where he joined a manufacturing company.

=== Asia Media ===
Wong founded Asia Media in 2007. Under his leadership, Asia Media has grown into a media company that reaches over 1.24 million viewers daily. The company also owns and operates the largest Transit-TV network in Malaysia known as Asia Media TV (AMTV). Asia Media was the first Malaysian company to be awarded 10-year licenses to operate three (3) blocks of L-Band Spectrums for both fixed and mobile broadcasting. The licenses cover both free and paid broadcasting models. The company opted for DMB-T technology for its mobile TV application.

=== Bright Packaging ===
On 10 February 2014, non-executive director Datuk Seri Syed Ali Alhabshee has ceased to be a substantial shareholder of the company following the disposal of his entire shareholding in a direct business transaction to Wong. Wong currently holds a 32.81% stake in Bright Packaging. In October 2013, Wong emerged as a dominant shareholder in Bright Packaging Industry Berhad, a main board listed company on Bursa Malaysia. This is the second public-listed company in which the 31-year-old Wong has a controlling stake after Asia Media. Wong acquired a 22.73% equity stake in the packaging company which also owns two freehold sites with a combined area of 136,998 square feet in Prime Klang valley's Subang Hi-Tech Industrial Park where its headquarters and factories are located. As of 31 August 2013, debt-free Bright Packaging had cash of $19.94 million while net assets per share stood at 62 cents. The market reacted positively after news of Wong's investment was made public and the stock increased another 17% on news of its expansion plan through rights issue. News of Wong's interest in taking the company private were denied by the Board in its annual general meeting held on 24 February 2014. Wong has quietly built up his stake in the company and currently holds 32.81% which is just short of the 33% threshold required to trigger a mandatory general offer.

=== Techfast Holdings ===
In May 2014, Wong made an offer of to acquire Techfast Holdings. The offer was submitted on the same day that Techfast held its AGM raising speculation that the offer may turn hostile. Wong had previously built a 14.45% stake in the company. TechFast noted its listing status is expected to be maintained should Wong's offer be accepted. This offer has been perceived as a takeover, an attempt by Wong to control three public-listed companies. Techfast Holdings's conditional voluntary takeover offer by Wong to acquire all the remaining shares in the company could only gather 22.48% of the share capital in Techfast with the offer tabled. The offer failed to meet the acceptance conditions within the proposed timeline.

Since the failed takeover by Wong in May 2014, Wong through his personal investment company Wong SK Holdings Sdn Bhd, has quietly emerged as the second largest shareholder of Techfast Holdings bearing 24,518,700 shares which equivalent to 16% of the share capital.

According to its Annual Report 2014, the largest shareholder is AVB Ventures Sdn Bhd which is controlled by its Managing Director Mr. Yap Yoon Seng, bearing 18.42% of its share capital. It remain to be seen that Wong emergence as the second largest shareholder of Techfast Holdings will again turn hostile to the incumbent Board of Directors.

=== Young Global Leader ===
On 11 March 2014, Wong was the only Malaysian honoured by the World Economic Forum as a Young Global Leader this year. This honour is bestowed by the World Economic Forum each year to recognise leaders who, amongst others, have achieved their success under the age of forty (40) and have track record of substantial leadership experience. Wong and 213 other honourees who were nominated from around the world, join the ranks of some of the most accomplished business and political leaders.

=== Junior Chamber International ===
Wong is a three-time winner of the Malaysia's Junior Chamber International's Creative Young Entrepreneur Award from 2008 till 2010 which is designed specifically to recognise and honour exceptionally creative young entrepreneurs for their success. JCI is a worldwide federation of young professionals and entrepreneurs between the ages of eighteen (18) to forty (40) with representatives from more than one hundred (100) nations.

== Awards ==
=== 2014 ===
In the 16 November 2014 issue of Malaysian Business magazine, Wong appeared in the "30 Successful Under-40 Malaysians" list. He stood out for the successes he have carved out in the media industry which he replicated across different industries as an investor. In the 30 August 2014 issue of Focus Malaysia Weekly, Wong appeared in the "20 Rich and Young" list. Wong's holdings in public companies is estimated to be worth some $56.8 million from his stakes in Asia Media, Bright Packaging Industry Bhd and Techfast Holdings Bhd.

=== 2013 ===
In the 30 March 2013 issue of Focus Malaysia Weekly, Wong appeared in the "40 CEOs under 40" list. Wong is the youngest CEO of a Bursa-listed company and Asia Media is the first company in Malaysian corporate history to have grown organically from a self-funded startup into a company listed on the Main Board of Bursa Malaysia. In February 2013, Wong was listed in the Top 10 ACE Market millionaires by Malaysian Business magazine for the third year in a row.

=== 2012 ===
In February 2012, Wong, was listed in the Top 10 ACE Market millionaires list by Malaysian Business magazine in its February 2012 issue.

=== 2011 ===
In February 2011, Wong was listed in the Top 10 ACE Market millionaires list by Malaysian Business magazine in its February 2011 issue. Also in the same month, Wong was featured as the winner in Prestige magazine's 'PRESTIGE 2010s Top 40 Under 40' award. On 11 January 2011, a date deliberately chosen as an auspicious day according to Chinese culture, Wong led Asia Media Group to a strong debut on the ACE Market opening at 40 sen, up 74% from its offer price of 23 sen. Subsequently, it closed at 28.5 sen, up 24% from its offer price with 40.92 million shares done. In January 2011, Asia Media Group, the parent company of Asia Media, a digital out-of-home Transit-TV company, saw the public portion of its initial public offering (IPO) oversubscribed by 21.46 times. The company was listed on the Ace Market of Bursa Malaysia on 11 January 2011.

=== 2008 – 2010 ===
In September 2010, Wong was announced as the top 3 winner in the worldwide JCI – Creative Young Entrepreneur Award 2010. In August 2010, Wong was also awarded Malaysia's JCI – Creative Young Entrepreneur Award for three years running, 2008, 2009 and 2010. In July 2010, Wong picked up Asia Pacific Entrepreneurship Awards (APEA) 2010 under the category of the Most Promising Entrepreneur Awards Wong was honoured with the 8th Asia Pacific International Entrepreneur Excellence Award 2009 under the category of Leadership Excellence. For his contributions to the media industry and society. Wong was conferred the Darjah Indera Mahkota Pahang (D.I.M.P) which carries the title "Dato'" by the seventh King of Malaysia His Royal Highness Sultan Pahang Sultan Haji Ahmad Shah, in conjunction with His Royal Highness's 78th birthday on 24 October 2008.

== Legal Issues ==
=== 2020 ===
On 10 May 2020, Securities Commission has filed a civil suit against Ricky Wong and two others in allegedly causing wrongful losses to Company. Ricky Wong has engaged solicitors defending the matter

=== 2021 ===
On 2 Nov 2021, Securities Commission sued the Accountant of Asia Media Group Bhd (AMGB), Ken Ong Kar Kian for furnishing a false statement relating to AMGB’s revenue of RM11.13 million to Bursa Malaysia.
