= Taliworks =

Public utilities company in Malaysia

Taliworks Corporation Berhad
- Formerly: Carpets International Malaysia Berhad
- Type: Public limited company
- Traded as: MYX: 8524
- ISIN: MYL8524OO000
- Industry: water & waste water, waste management, Highway management, Bacteria production
- Founded: 1987
- Headquarters: Kuala Lumpur, Malaysia
- Parent: LGB Group
- Website: www.taliworks.com.my

Taliworks Corporation Berhad (MYX: 8524) is a Malaysian public utilities conglomerate. It is a member of LGB Group. Taliworks Corporation is involved in water treatment, waste management, highway concession and construction. Taliworks holds a 21-year concession rights for the operation and management of the Tianjin Panlou Life Waste Transfer Station, in Tianjin, China. Taliworks' research and technology arm has a production facility that produces CK21 bacteria, which is used for water and wastewater sludge treatment in China. The company is listed on Bursa Malaysia (MYX: 8524). The company has also purchased a controlling stake in highway operator Grand Saga Sdn Bhd for 107.8 million ringgit, or roughly 31 million USD.

== Profile ==
- Taliworks Corporation Berhad is listed on the Main Market of the Malaysia Securities Exchange Berhad (Bursa Malaysia) under the Trading/Services Sector (Name and Code: TALIWRK (MYX: 8524).
- Taliworks Corporation Berhad is engaged in the management, operation and maintenance of water treatment, waste management, highway concession and construction.

== Services ==
It has multiple segments:

- water, which is engaged in the management, operations and maintenance of water treatment plants and water distribution systems;
- investment holding, which involves investment holding and dormant companies;
- construction, which is engaged in the design, construction and supervision of water supply works under a turnkey contract;
- waste management, which provides management, operation and maintenance of waste management services and technical services relating to waste management;
- Highway, which is engaged in the management and operation of the Cheras-Kajang Highway concession (Grand Saga Sdn Bhd) which expires in year 2027;
- Taliworks has also secured a 21-year concession rights for the operation and maintenance of Tianjin Panlou Life Waste Transfer Station in China;
- Taliworks Analytical Laboratory is certified with MS ISO/IEC 17025:2005.
