= Medair =

Natural disaster aid organization

- Founded: 1989
- Type: Non-governmental organisation
- Purpose: Helping people affected by natural disaster or conflict recover with dignity
- Location: Ecublens, Switzerland (Global Support Office)
- Region served: 13 countries
- Employees: 1500+
- Website: medair.org

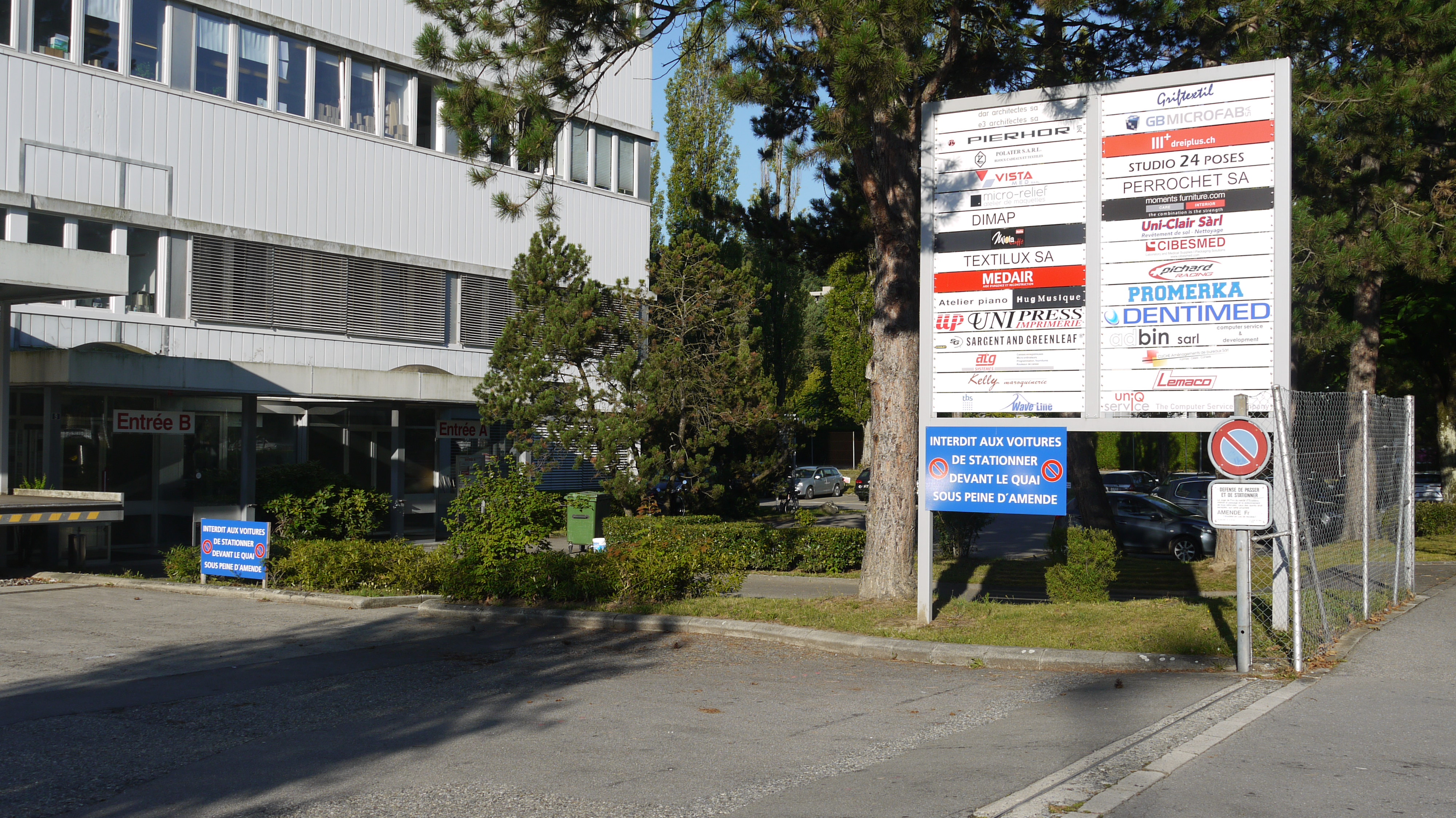
Medair HQ in Écublens, Vaud, Switzerland

Medair is an international non-governmental organisation (INGO) whose purpose is to relieve human suffering in some of the world's most remote and devastated places. Medair aims to assist people affected by natural disasters and conflict to recover with dignity through the delivery of quality humanitarian aid.

Founded in the Canton of Vaud, Switzerland, in 1989, Medair is inspired by the Christian faith to serve the most vulnerable—regardless of race, gender, religion, age, or nationality. As of 2019, Medair employs more than 1,500 employees worldwide and has an annual operating budget of $105,286,664. More than 4.6 million people worldwide received direct support from the organization in 2022.

== History ==
=== Founding ===
In 1988, Dr. Erik Volkmar and Dr. Josiane Volkmar-André were asked to travel to conflict-torn Soroti, Uganda with the support of three partner organisations—Medicaments pour L'Afrique (MEDAF), Mission Aviation Fellowship (MAF), and Youth with a Mission (YWAM)—to establish an organisation that would combine the efforts of the three organisations in order to respond more quickly and effectively to the growing crisis. This first, unified response provided support to displaced people as they resettled into towns where essential services were destroyed by the conflict.

Medair was co-founded in 1989 in Switzerland by a group of eight volunteers led by Dr. Erik Volkmar and Dr. Josiane Volkmar-André—both trained physicians and experienced humanitarian aid workers.

=== Early years ===
In the years following, Medair expanded its programming to include projects assisting internally displaced people in Sudan, Liberia, and Iraq. By 1995, Medair was operating independently from its founding organisations, but continues to partner with Mission Aviation Fellowship (MAF) today when its activities require them to travel to difficult-to-reach places inaccessible by car or foot.

=== Today ===
As of 2022, Medair is active in 13 countries and responding to global crises including the Syrian refugee crisis, the Ebola outbreak in DR Congo, and the Rohingya refugee crisis in Bangladesh. With expertise in health and nutrition, emergency shelter, water and sanitation, and cash assistance, more than 4.6 million people worldwide received direct support from Medair 2022.

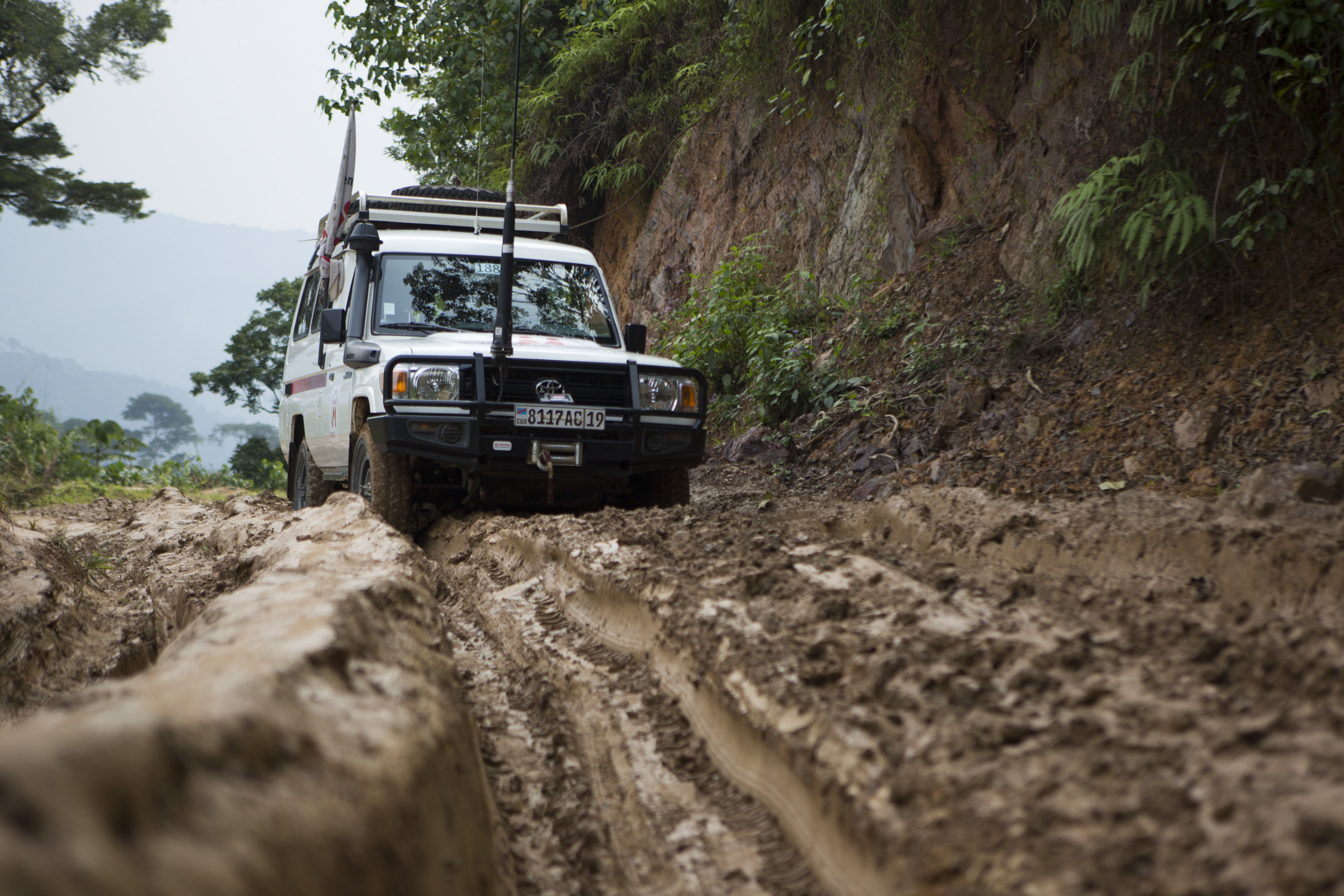

== Organisation ==
=== Past leadership ===
Co-founder Erik Volkmar acted as Medair's first CEO for 15 years before stepping down in 2003.

In 2004, Randall Zindler, a graduate of Lancaster University's MBA programme, became CEO. Zindler held a number of corporate positions with companies including Credit Suisse and Swissair before accepting the role of CEO for Medair.

In 2011, Zindler stepped down and Jim Ingram transitioned into the role of CEO that same year. Ingram began working for Medair years prior as its Finance Director and was a member of the Executive Leadership Team.

After seven years of leading the organisation as CEO, Ingram retired in 2018 and David Verboom was appointed CEO by the International Board of Trustees.

After 5 years of leadership under David Verboom, Anne Reitsema took over on April 4, 2023.

https://www.medair.org/press/medair-appoints-anne-reitsema-as-new-ceo/

=== Current leadership ===
Anne Reitsema became Medair’s Chief Executive Officer in 2023. Anne joined Medair in 2004 and has since led Medair’s programmes in Zimbabwe, Angola, Uganda, Sudan, South Sudan, and overseen Medair’s programmes in Somalia and Somaliland from the Global Support Office. In 2019, Anne became International Programmes Director.

Before joining Medair, Anne worked as a social worker. She holds a bachelor’s degree in Social Work from the North West University Potchefstroom in South Africa, and a master’s degree in Counselling from CTS in Saint Louis, Missouri in the US.

As International Programmes Director, Anne oversees Medair’s country programmes and the Global Emergency Response Team.

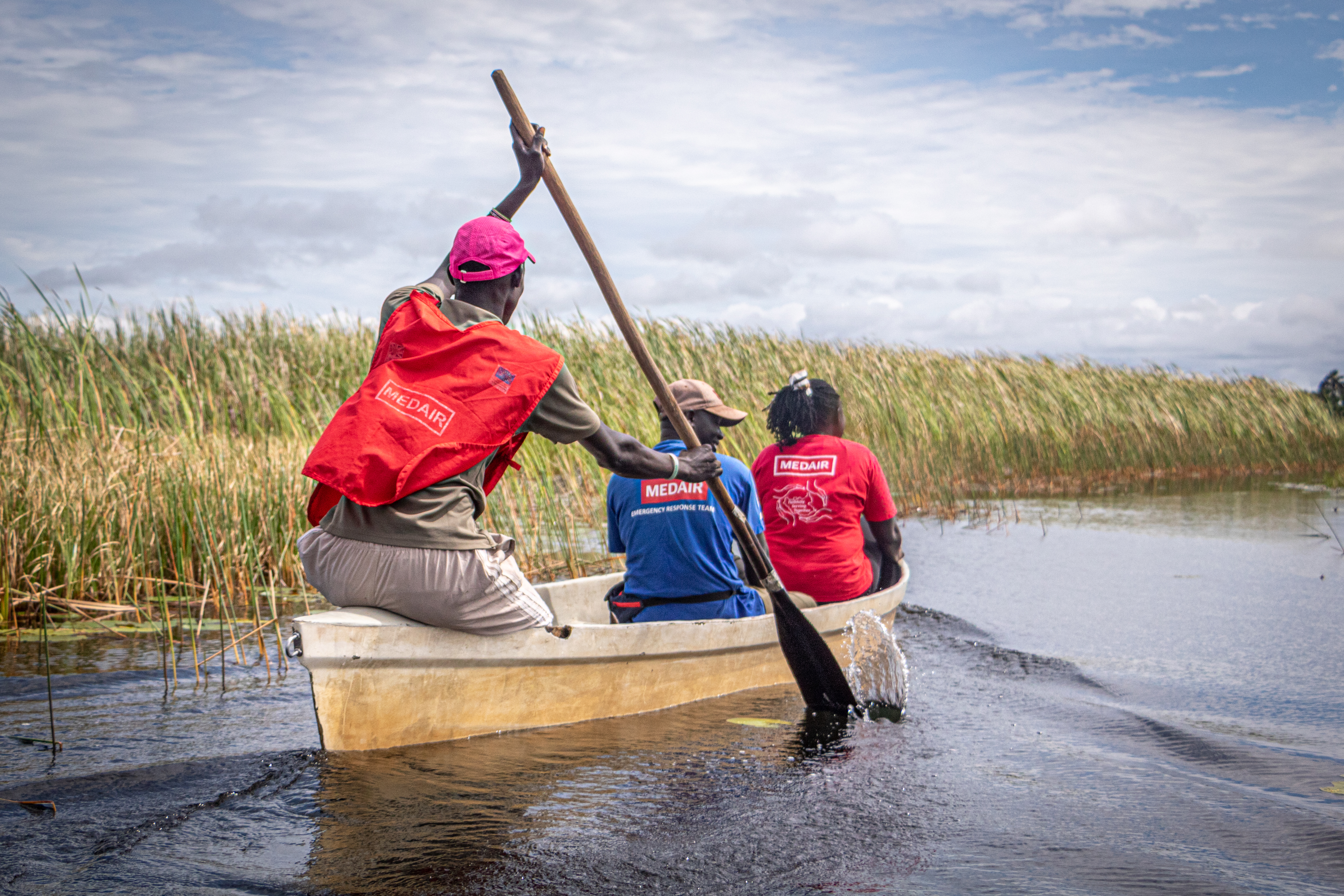

The Board of International Trustees is the organisation's governing body, and is composed of 9 leaders in their respective fields. Together, they are responsible for the missional and financial success of the organisation. Medair's board is appointed or elected by members of the Medair Association. The CEO is responsible for the management of Medair, supported by an Executive Leadership Team.

=== Global offices ===
Medair is headquartered in Ecublens, Switzerland. The Global Support Office (GSO) in Switzerland provides programmatic, logistics, and funding support to the country programmes as well as support in human resources and recruitment, finance, fundraising and marketing, and information services.

Medair has nine other offices located in Zurich, Geneva, Basel, South Korea, the United States, Germany, the United Kingdom, France and the Netherlands. These affiliate offices don't carry out or coordinate field programming. Instead, they assist with fundraising for field programs, recruiting international relief workers, and engaging local supporters.

=== Staffing ===
Medair recruits experienced and new relief workers with expertise in project management, health services, nutrition, water, human resources, logistics, communications and infrastructure rehabilitation.

Employees are recruited internationally as well as nationally to work in field programs. Nationally recruited staff make up 80% of their total workforce across all field locations. Internationally recruited staff are expected to align with the organization's faith value and be experienced professionals in their field.

Prospective Medair staff participate in a Relief and Rehabilitation Orientation Course (ROC). This intensive course takes place multiple times a year and aims to evaluate and train participants before they go to the field.

=== Programming ===
As of 2022, Medair is operational in 13 countries. Medair directly implements its programming in its field locations and works with partner organisations when needed to access hard-to-reach, affected populations.

Medair implements projects to meet the urgent needs of people affected by crisis and natural disaster, including emergency relief, shelter support, medical care, nutrition services, and water, sanitation, and hygiene (WASH). They also provide mental health and psychosocial support, build the capacity of local structures—such as health centers—and improve local infrastructure and disaster preparedness through implementing the Disaster Risk Reduction approach.

=== Finances ===
In 2022, Medair's total operating budget was $105,286,664, and 92% of operating expenses went directly to providing humanitarian aid. The remaining 8% was attributed to fundraising and management. Medair's main sources of funding include private donors, governmental and inter-governmental partners, non-governmental and partner organizations, foundations, corporate partners, and other public partners.

In 2022, 56.1% of their operating income came from governmental support such as US Agency for International Development (USAID), and Swiss Agency for Development and Cooperation (SDC). Additional funding came from United Nations agencies, such as The United Nations Children's Fund (UNICEF).

In 2022, corporate, foundation, and other private donations constituted 19.2% of the operating income, followed by other institutions and non-governmental organisations contributing 18.7% to total operating income. Gifts-in-kind provided for 5.8% of their operating income and 0.2% came from other income sources.

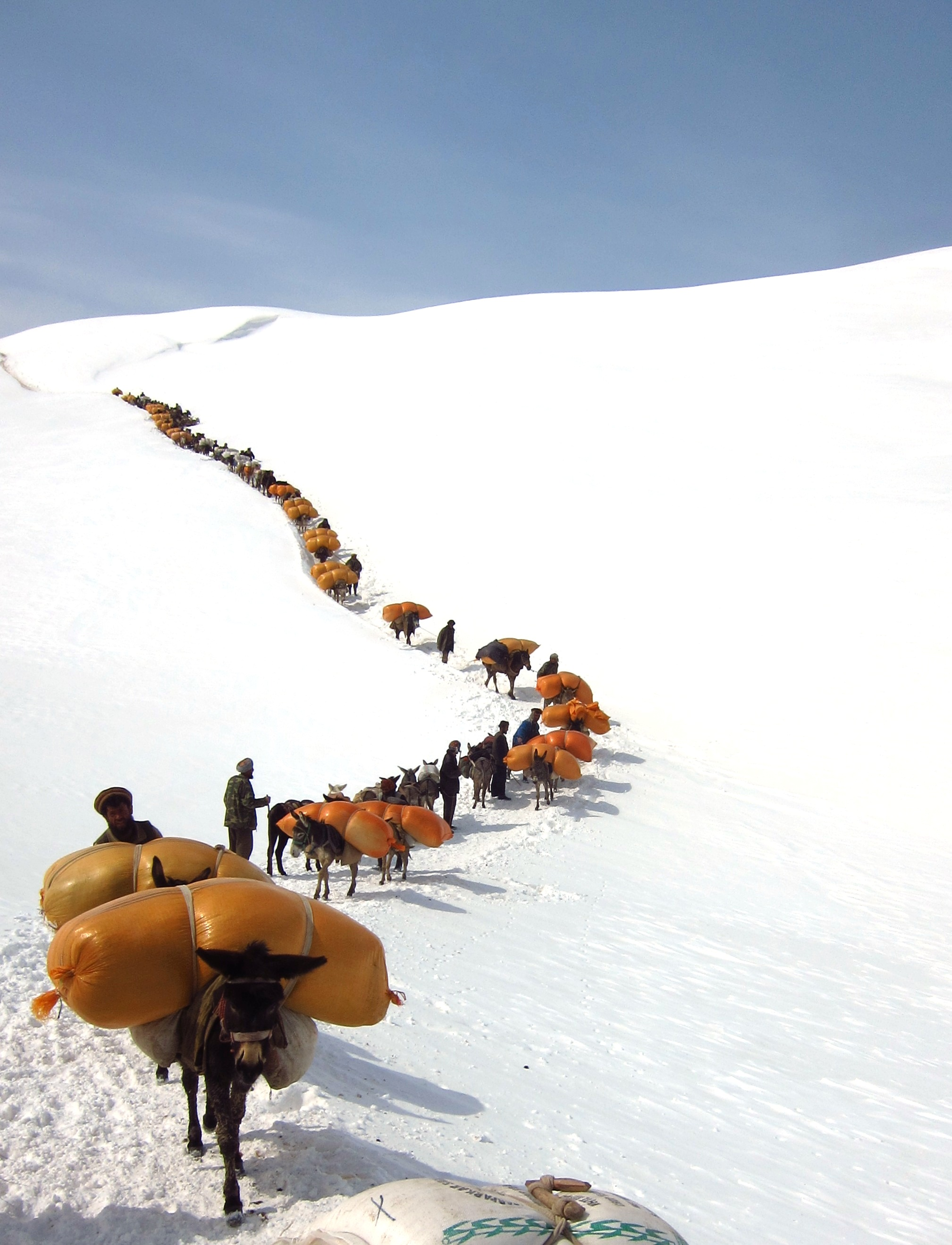

== Activities ==
As a signatory of the Code of Conduct for the International Red Cross and Red Crescent Movement and NGOs in Disaster Relief, Medair provides humanitarian aid to the most vulnerable—regardless of race, gender, religion, age, or nationality.

Medair focuses primarily on four areas of need:

=== Emergency response ===
In 2022, Medair responded to emergencies in 13 countries and to some of the worst humanitarian disasters, including the conflict in Ukraine/Poland, the ongoing crisis in Afghanistan, the refugee crisis in Lebanon and Syria, flooding and disease outbreaks in South Sudan, flooding and cyclones in Madagascar, and drought and conflict in Somalia. In emergencies, Medair focuses on two components:

==== Emergency relief ====
When disasters strike, Medair's Global Emergency Response Teams deploy quickly to affected areas to bring life-saving relief in the form of emergency shelter and safe demolition, essential household items, safe drinking water, sanitation, and emergency health care.

==== Building Back Better ====
Medair's Building Back Better approach is used in the recovery phase to help affected communities safeguard against future disasters. This is achieved through rebuilding homes and infrastructure using strong building materials and disaster-resilient construction methods. In 2022, 516,150 people received shelter assistance.

=== Women and children ===
Women and children are often said to be the most affected by emergencies[i]. To meet their unique needs, Medair states they provide support to vulnerable women and children in three ways:

==== Nutrition ====
Medair runs intensive malnutrition treatment programs for young children, pregnant women, and breastfeeding mothers as well as teaches communities how to prevent malnutrition in the future. In 2022, 86,274 people treated for acute malnutrition.

==== Health care ====
Medair says they support local health clinics by training and supervising health clinic staff and providing them with essential medicines and supplies. They focus their support on primary health care, vaccinations, and safe childbirth.

==== Community health ====
Medair runs 'Care Groups' of trained women volunteers who regularly visit with women and their families in their community to promote good health, hygiene, and nutrition. In some communities with poor access to health clinics, Medair trains local health workers to visit ill children at home and treat common diseases. They also offer support services for trauma victims and women and girls affected by gender-based violence.

=== Refugees and displaced people ===
Medair has been assisting refugees affected by the Syrian crisis since 2012 and the Rohingya crisis since 2017, as well as the large numbers of displaced people as a result of instability in Iraq and South Sudan. According to their website, they support refugees and displaced people through:

==== Emergency relief ====
Medair supplies tents to displaced people and refugees to provide immediate protection as well as emergency household supplies and hygiene kits to safeguard against disease.

==== Emergency health care ====
Medair establishes emergency health clinics for displaced people and refugees in places like Iraq, Lebanon's Bekaa Valley, and in Kutupalong refugee camp in Bangladesh where the influx of people overwhelms the capacity of local health services.

==== Clean water, sanitation, & hygiene ====
Medair provides safe drinking water and latrines to communities and promotes safe hygiene practices. In 2022,1,025,421 people gained improved access to safe drinking water.

==== Cash assistance ====
Medair provides families in crisis with cash assistance to improve their temporary living conditions and assist with the cost of medical care.

=== Innovation ===
Medair uses GIS (Geographical Information Systems) mapping technology to help identify and track refugee communities in Lebanon. In other programs, they use mobile devices—such as tablets and smart phones – to collect survey data about project participants and their needs.

Medair also works with partners to innovate and provide solutions to increase resilience – such as working with EPFL’s Tech4Dev and the University of Juba's Structural Xploration Lab to design a “better shelter” for flood-prone communities in Africa.

=== Notable past projects ===
==== Rwanda ====
After the Rwandan genocide in 1994, Medair provided emergency relief to the Bugesera region, which had lost 80% of its population to the genocide. Medair worked to get medical centres running again and provided reconciliation seminars. Medair brought in psychiatrists to provide trauma counseling for both Hutus and Tutsis. These workshops brought together mixed ethnic groups to share their stories.

==== Uganda ====
Medair spent over a decade in Uganda—from 1999 to 2010—making it one of Medair's longest running programmes. During this time, the Lord's Resistance Army (LRA) terrorised the majority of northern Uganda. Medair worked with people living in camps for internally displaced persons (IDPs) at the height of the crisis. Later, Medair helped these people resettle into their home villages again.

==== Sri Lanka ====
After the 2004 Indian Ocean earthquake and tsunami, staff were operational in the district of Ampara—the hardest hit area of Sri Lanka—within five days. Medair found the greatest needs to be water, sanitation, food, and shelter. Working with Bushproof—a company specialising in water technologies for difficult environments—Medair secured emergency drinking water supplies for people living in remote displacement camps. Over the next year, Medair's Sri Lanka response included shelter construction, restoring the livelihoods of the fishing community through the distribution of boats and nets, and improving public health through latrine construction, well cleaning, and hygiene education.

==== Pakistan ====
After a massive earthquake in Pakistan in 2005, Medair responded by distributing shelter and household kits to families as winter was approaching. In the recovery phase, Medair helped restore livelihoods by redistributing livestock and seeds to farmers who had lost theirs in the earthquake. Medair also contributed to the reconstruction of remote, mountainous villages damaged or destroyed during the earthquake.

==== South Sudan ====
Medair has worked in South Sudan since 1992 and is one of the most active humanitarian relief organisations in the country. In 2010, Medair made headlines for a study conducted with partner NGO, Save the Children, which revealed high rates of malnutrition in Akobo, South Sudan. With a Global Acute Malnutrition (GAM) level of 45.7% and a severe acute malnutrition (SAM) level of 15.5%, Akobo's rates were three times higher than emergency malnutrition thresholds. Both organisations responded quickly by implementing therapeutic feeding programmes. Medair continues to be on the frontlines of disease outbreaks, including the measles outbreak in 2019.

==== Haiti ====
After the Haiti earthquake in 2010, Medair provided transitional shelters to 11,622 people without housing in Jacmel and the surrounding area. These transitional shelters were able to be transformed into permanent homes.

After Hurricane Matthew in 2016, Medair's emergency response team returned to Port-au-Prince within 72 hours of the hurricane. Medair has assembled emergency shelter and hygiene kits, although access to the affected coastal communities of Tiburon Peninsula was very difficult. Instead, Medair teams traveled by sea to distribute 300 hygiene kits to families to help prevent cholera. In total, Medair distributed emergency medical kits with medicine for 20,000 people, provided shelter kits to more than 14,000 people, and gave 16,000 people access to safe drinking water.

==== Afghanistan ====
In 2012, Medair staff were abducted in Afghanistan's Badakhshan province. The swift actions of international security forces and a well-rehearsed internal crisis plan led to the safe release of all of staff members. After the incident, Medair closed operations in Badakhshan while continuing to work in Afghanistan's Central Highlands.

Medair worked in Badakhshan from 2000 to 2012 and left a long-term impact in the province, having improved access to water and sanitation, expanded and upgraded the local health care system, and carried out life-saving health and nutrition services in very remote communities.

==== Syrian Crisis ====
In 2012, Medair sent emergency teams to Lebanon and Jordan to respond to the flood of refugees arriving from Syria. Shelter was an urgent priority in Lebanon's Bekaa Valley where winters can be harsh. Medair distributed emergency shelter kits and provided families with wood-burning stoves, blankets, and mattresses. Medair continues to support Syrian refugees living in Lebanon and Jordan today, and expanded programming into Syria in 2015.

==== The Philippines ====
In 2013, Medair's emergency response team provided relief to isolated communities in the aftermath of Typhoon Haiyan, which killed more than 6,000 people and displaced more than four million people. In its first year, Medair reached more than 60,000 people with emergency shelters, health, and hygiene support.

Medair stayed in the Philippines until 2018 to help communities recover. Through its Build Back Better project, Medair provided 1,680 families with new, typhoon-resilient homes, trained more than 3,000 people in Disaster Risk Reduction techniques, and built 1,250 latrines for families who had lost theirs in the disaster.

== Accreditations, affiliations, and partnerships ==
In 2001, Medair became the first European NGO to obtain ISO 9001:2000 worldwide certification—a family of international quality management standards and guidelines normally applied to industry.

Medair was the first member of the Humanitarian Accountability Partnership International (HAP-I). Other members include CARE International, Oxfam, World Vision, and Save the Children.

In 2013, Medair joined the global Integral Alliance—a network of Christian relief and development agencies that facilitates collaboration and unity among similar humanitarian organisations to increase the capacity and quality of disaster response. Medair is also a member of EU-CORD, a network of European Christian humanitarian organisations that work cooperatively.

Medair's offices in Switzerland have received the ZEWO seal of approval, which is a Swiss label that identifies non-profit organisations who spend funds responsibly. Its United States office has received the Excellence in Giving Transparency Certification[viii] and GuideStar's Gold Seal of Transparency in 2018.

In 2019, Medair was awarded full Core Humanitarian Standard on Quality and Accountability (CHS) certification for its principled, accountable, and high-quality humanitarian action. The CHS sets out nine commitments for humanitarian and development actors to measure and improve the quality and effectiveness of their assistance.

Additional partnerships and affiliations for Medair's offices worldwide includes A.S.A.H., Concord, The Cash Learning Partnership (CaLP), Interaction Switzerland, Bond, the CORE Group, LINGOs, The Global Health Cluster, the European Interagency Security Forum, IDCN, Fundraising Standards Board, NetHope, the Global Logistics Cluster, Coordination Sud, Humanitarian University, the Swiss NGO DRR Platform, the Global Shelter Cluster, NGO Voice, QUAMED, imPACT Coalition, and the Global WASH Cluster.
