= Ruth D. Hines =

Ruth Dianne Hines also "Ruth Diana Hines" (1951-; ) was an Australian Accounting academic at Macquarie University from 1978 to 1994, part of the Alternative or Critical Perspectives on Accounting movement. She is best known for her 1988 paper, "Financial Accounting: in Communicating Reality, We Construct Reality". Google Scholar in August-2025 shows this cited 1904 times (August-2018: 1214), comparing well to the 13099 (August-2018: 8160) of the 1968 "Ball and Brown" paper, winner of the inaugural "Seminal Paper" in Economics award.

Hines left Academe to write poetry and children's books after gaining her PhD.

While a lecturer at Macquarie University, her PhD was supervised by Kenneth Peasnell of Lancaster University Management School (LUMS).

Her 1996 piece "Net profit is a God", is a poem from her PhD Dissertation and was invited for a special edition of AAAJ. It only appears in the printed version of the journal.

== Publications ==
- 1982. "The usefulness of annual corporate Reports: The anomaly between the Efficient Market Hypothesis and shareholder surveys", Accounting and Business Research, Vol 12, Nr 48, pp296–309
- 1983. "Economic consequences of accounting standards: One Good Reason for Accounting Standards Review Board", Charter (was 'Chartered Accountant in Australia') Vol 54, July. pp24–27
- 1984. "The Implications of Stock Market Reaction (Non-Reaction) for Financial Accounting Standard Setting", Accounting and Business Research Vol 15, no. 57 (January 1): pp3–15.
- 1988. "Financial Accounting: in Communicating Reality, We Construct Reality", Accounting, Organizations and Society Volume 13, Issue 3, 1988, pp 251–261.
- 1989. "The Sociopolitical Paradigm in Financial Accounting Research", Accounting, Auditing & Accountability Journal. Vol 2. Issue 1
- 1989. "Financial Accounting Knowledge, Conceptual Framework Projects and the Social Construction of the Accounting Profession", Accounting, Auditing & Accountability Journal. Vol 2. Issue 1
- 1991. "On Valuing Nature", Accounting, Auditing & Accountability Journal. Vol 4. Issue 3
- 1991. "The FASB's conceptual framework, financial accounting and the maintenance of the social world", Accounting, Organizations and Society, vol. 16(4), pp 313–331.
- 1992. "Accounting: Filling the negative space", Accounting, Organizations and Society. Vol 17. Issue 3-4.
- 1993. "Accounting: In Communicating a World, We Create a World", PhD Dissertation, University of Lancaster, DEAD LINK?
- 1993. "Accounting: In Communicating a World, We Create a World", PhD Dissertation, via British Library
- 1993. "Accounting: In Communicating a World, We Create a World", PhD Dissertation, Catalogue Entry, National Library of Australia
- 1996. "Net profit is a god", Accounting Auditing and Accountability Journal. Vol 9. Issue 5. pp 129–132
