= Tang Siu Hau =

Hong Kong singer

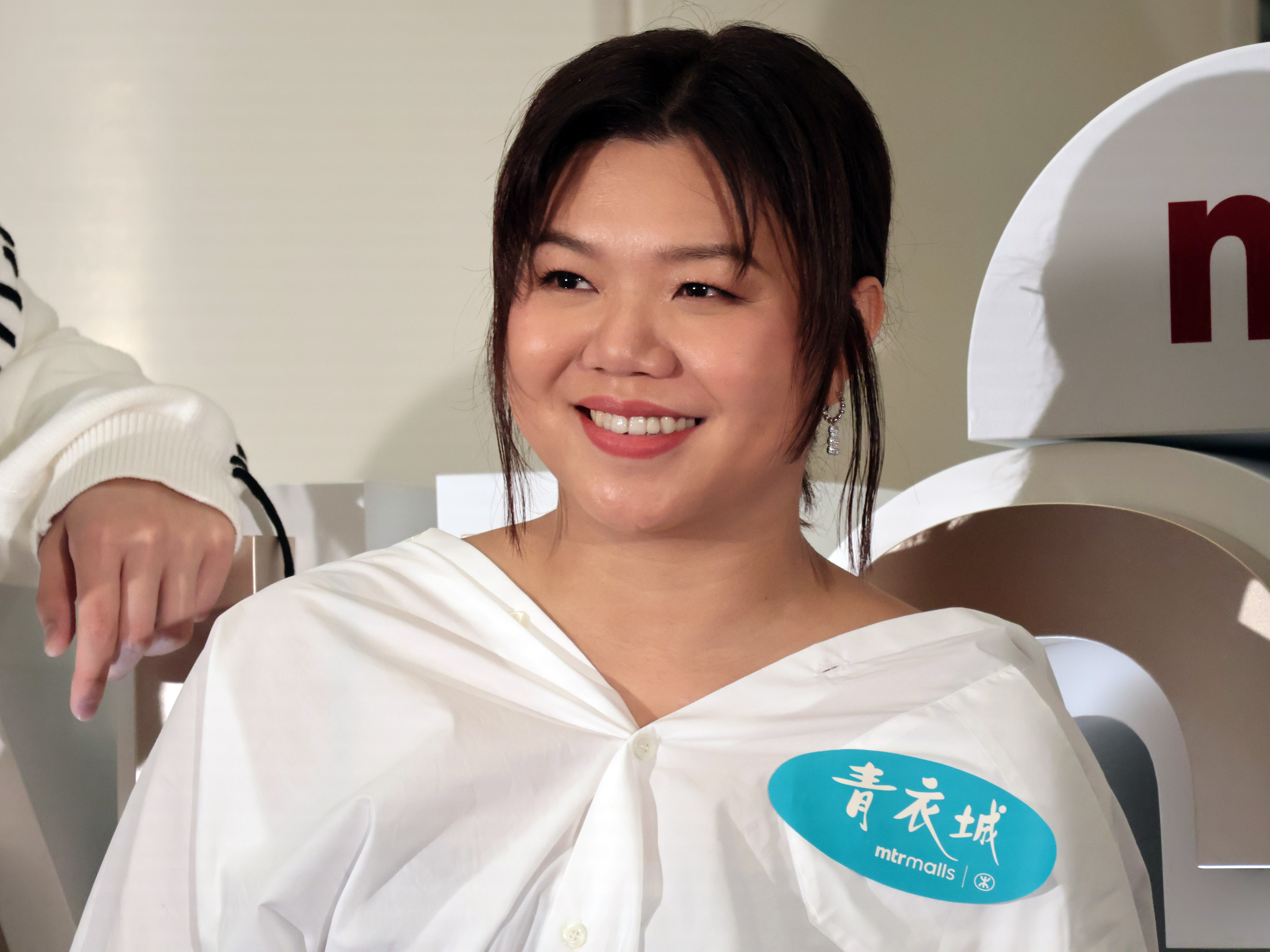
- 2020
- Born: June 24, 1989 (age 37); Shenzhen, China
- Occupation: Singer
- Years active: 2009-present
- Agents: Frenzi Music; Asia Media
- Website: 鄧小巧 tvb.com

Tang Siu Hau (simplified Chinese: 邓小巧; traditional Chinese: 鄧小巧; pinyin: Dèng Xiǎo Qiǎo; born 24 June 1989), is a Hong Kong female singer who debuted in 2010. She was a top 10 finalist of the Hong Kong edition of the show, The Voice.

== Career ==
Tang was born in Shenzhen, Her present is a Driver and Cleaner, She has one brother and one sister. She moved to Hong Kong when she was a teenager, She graduated from Chinese Language in The Education University of Hong Kong.

In 2009, she participated in the television singing contest, The Voice and came as the sixth and signed to TVB. In 2014, she participated in The Voice of China (season 3).

In 2015, she signed to Frenzi Music and in 2016, she signed to Asia Media.

In 2016, she had released her debut extended play, The Strength of Weakness. The lead single, "Elegant" had peaked at the first place at RTHK music station and won the Top Cantopop Songs from Music King Awards.

In 2018, she had released her second extended play, Inner Voice.

In 2019, she had released her third extended play, No Coincidence and won the Artist to Watch Award from KKBOX Hong Kong Music Awards.

== Discography ==
=== Extended plays ===
- The Strength of Weakness (2016)
- Inner Voice (2018)
- No Coincidence (2019)
- Obsessions (2019)
- Petit Fours (2022)

== Concerts/Tours ==
=== Headlining concerts ===
Date	Country	City	Venue	References
【Inner Strength】Concert
October 13, 2018	China	Hong Kong	Hong Kong Academy of Performing Arts	
【My Healing Live】Concert
December 1, 2019	China	Hong Kong	Macpherson Stadium	
