= Taman Tasik Prima =

Township in Selangor, Malaysia

Coordinates: 2.98678°N 101.60607°E

Tasik Prima is a township in Petaling District, Selangor, Malaysia. It is a 345-acre (1.40 km^{2}) township with a 200-acre (0.81 km^{2}) resort lake, comprising linked houses, bungalows, semi-detached houses, condominiums, shop offices and amenities. It is located within close proximity of IOI Mall, Lotus's (formerly TESCO), GIANT and Aeon (formerly JUSCO) Hypermarket in Puchong. It lies within the Multimedia Super Corridor (MSC) and is accessible to the major highways and expressways in the Klang Valley.

Access to Tasik Prima is made convenient via Lebuhraya Damansara-Puchong (LDP), Lebuhraya Bukit Jalil and Shah Alam Expressway (Kesas Highway). It is neighboring to housing estates such as Puchong Utama, Puchong Perdana, Puchong Tekali, and Puchong Prima.
