= Viztel Solutions Group =

Viztel Solutions Berhad
- Company type: Public
- Industry: Telecommunications software
- Founded: 1999
- Founder: Lau Kin Wai, Pang Hao Chen
- Defunct: 2011
- Successor: Systech Berhad
- Headquarters: Unit 03, Ground Floor, Bangunan YIN, Phileo Damansara 1, Section 16/11, 46350 Petaling Jaya, Malaysia

Viztel Solutions Berhad is involved in the business of developing and marketing of voice technologies and telecom software services.

It is a fast-growing technology firm that was publicly listed on the MESDAQ Market of Bursa Malaysia (MESDAQ: VIZTEL, 0050) since July 2004. The Group has business presence in South East Asia, Greater China, Middle East and USA.

== History ==
Viztel Solutions Group or Viztel Solutions Berhad was founded in 1999 by 4 engineers, namely Lau Kin Wai, Pang Hao Chen, Chong Kam Hoe and Tan Heng Kiat.
