= Nahed Taher =

Nahed Taher (Arabic:ناهد طاهر) is a Saudi businesswoman, founder and former chief executive officer of Gulf One Investment Bank, which has its headquarters in Bahrain.

== Education ==
Taher went to school in Austin, Texas, as her father was completing his studies. Then she studied in Kuwait, when her father was elected the President of OPEC, later she continued her secondary education in Saudi Arabia, and joined the King Abdulaziz University in Jeddah, where she earned her master's degree in economics. Taher continued her studies at Lancaster University Management School in the UK, where she received her MSc in economics in 1998, and PhD in economics in 2001.

== Career ==
After returning to Saudi Arabia, Taher worked as senior economist for the National Commercial Bank. In 2005 she was made CEO of Gulf One Investment Bank, becoming the first woman to lead a bank in the Persian Gulf area. Taher left the position in 2017 to join the National Standard Finance as president.

== Recognition ==
- Ranked 72nd in Forbes' 100 Most Powerful Women in the World (2006).
- Ranked 25th, 24th, and 23rd on the Financial Times' Top 50 Women in World Business in 2009, 2010, and 2011, respectively.
- Listed in the Dow Jones/Financial News' FN100 Women List amongst the most influential female leaders in European, Middle Eastern, and African markets as they navigated the fallout from the 2008 global financial crisis.
- Named regularly among Arabian Business' 100 Most Powerful Arab Women between 2007 and 2017.
- Awarded an Honorary Professorial Fellowship by Lancaster University.
