= TSH Resources =

TSH Resources Berhad is a holding company from Kuala Lumpur, Malaysia. It primarily engages in cultivating, processing, and refining oil palm. Other operations include segment manufactures and sale of downstream wood products. Furthermore, it operates a forest management unit, it manufactures, sells, and trades cocoa products and generates and supplies electricity from biomass plants. Tan Aik Sim is its management director, Loh Toi Meei its chief financial officer and Tan Aik Yong its executive director. Its revenue is MYR 1.05bn, its net income MYR 70.57m and its number of employees 2.09k (all as of 2018). It is active in Central Kalimantan, Central Kalimantan, and West Sumatra in Indonesia and Sabah in Malaysia. It claims to have received a sustainable forest management license from the state government of Sabah to manage 300,000 acres of forest for 100 years. It supplies crude palm oil and palm kernel to Musim Mas. “Sustainable Palm Oil Transparency Toolkit” (SPOTT) ranks TSH Resources 24th of 25 among of the world’s largest publicly listed palm oil companies.

== Subsidiaries ==
Its subsidiaries include LKSK Sdn. Bhd., which is engaged in oil palm plantations; Tan Soon Hong Holdings Sdn. Bhd., which is engaged in oil palm plantations and investment holding, and TSH Bio-Energy Sdn. Bhd., which is engaged in the operation of a power plant. PT Sarana Prima Multi Niaga (SPMN), is a subsidiary of TSH Resources and a supplier to Wilmar.

It is a member of Roundtable on Sustainable Palm Oil. Children have done hazardous work on plantations owned by SPMN. Harvesters work in excess of the limit of 40 hours per week set out under Indonesian law.
