= Asia Media Group =

Malaysian media company

Asia Media Group Berhad
- Type: Public limited company
- Traded as: KLSE Stock code 0159
- ISIN: MYQ0159OO002
- Industry: Outdoor Advertising
- Founded: 2007
- Founder: Ricky Wong
- Headquarters: Puchong, Kuala Lumpur, Malaysia
- Key people: Syed Ali Alhabshee, Chairman; Ricky Wong, CEO
- Products: Digital media/Advertising
- Number of employees: 70+
- Website: asiamedia.net.my

Asia Media Group Berhad (MYX: 0159) is a broadcasting, advertising and digital media company in Malaysia. It operates the country's Largest Transit-TV Network. The company provides infotainment and advertising services such as program sponsorships and video advertising using digital electronic displays installed in various indoor and outdoor premises. Asia Media also provides entertainment services, including local news, sports, health, entertainment, and documentary content.

As of April 2012, its network included:

- 3,993 screens on board the Malaysian Public Transportation System (Certified by the Malaysian Book of Records)

== Asia Media TV ==
Asia Media TV, better known as AMTV, is Asia Media's flagship channel and is shown on its Transit-TV network. Contents include weekly programs on sales, marketing, technology, regional developments and news. According to Nielsen Research, AMTV has a daily viewership of 1.24 million. AMTV participates in two way conversations that occur within the context of social media and then creates its programming based on what the viewers say they want. A typical digital campaign includes interaction via mobile phones, on-line participation, viral videos, games, polls and sweepstakes.

== Broadcasting ==
Malaysian Communications and Multimedia Commission (MCMC) awarded three (3) blocks of L-Band Spectrums, i.e. 1452.960, 1454.672 & 1456.384 MHz respectively to Asia Media. Asia Media is the first Malaysian company to be awarded digital broadcasting licenses covering both fixed and mobile broadcasting for free-to-air as well as subscription based models. The company opted for DMB-T technology for its mobile TV application.

== Recent corporate history ==
=== 2015 ===
Asia Media Group has acquired DPO Plantations Sdn Bhd as a fully owned subsidiary on 20 January. Subsequently on 10 April, DPO Plantations has entered into an agreement to form a joint-venture company with the local state Government, Sarawak Land Custody Development Authority to cultivate oil palm. Under the agreement, a total of 4,361 hectares (10,776.3 acres) of land will be cultivated with an estimated investment of RM70 million (US$20 million). The market reacts positively with its share price rises 8.33% on the day of the announcement.

=== 2014 ===
In May, Asia Media Group won The BrandLaureate BestBrands Awards 2013-2014: Best Brand in Media - Transit TV Network.

=== 2013 ===
On 4 July, Asia Media proposed renounceable rights issue of up to 752,400,000 new ordinary shares of RM0.10 each on the basis of one rights share for every existing share held, together with up to 188,100,000 free new warrants. An additional warrant will be issued for every four rights shares subscribed on the entitlement date. The rights issue was completed on 26 September with an acceptance rate of 88% raising RM50 million. Post-issue, the company's market capitalisation stands at RM130 million. The funds raised are being used to finance the roll-out of live broadcasting across Asia Media's Transit-TV network.

In May, Asia Media Group won The BrandLaureate BestBrands Awards 2012-2013: Best Brand in Media - Transit TV Network. In the 30 March 2013 issue of Focus Malaysia Weekly, Dato' Ricky Wong appeared in the ’40 CEOs under 40’ list. It is the list of 40 powerful individuals aged 40 and below who are the next generation of movers and shakers of corporate Malaysia. In February 2013, Dato' Ricky Wong was listed in this year's Top 10 ACE Market millionaires by Malaysian Business magazine for the third year in a row. He moves up from number five(5) position to number four(4) in this year's ranking. On 18 February 2013, Bursa Malaysia Securities announced the transfer of the securities of Asia Media Group from the ACE Market to the Main Market of Bursa Malaysia Securities under the “Trading/Services” sector.

Asia Media Group received approval from the Securities Commission for its proposed listing transfer from the ACE Market to the Main Market of Bursa Malaysia. The company’s securities were actively traded on 8 January 2013, the day the announcement was made. Its mother share closed 0.5 sen lower at 20 sen, with over 22 million shares traded. Asia Media warrants (AMEDIA-WA) were the most active traded security on Bursa Malaysia, rising seven sen or 1,400 per cent to close at 7.5 sen, with more than 59.5 million shares traded. At the same time, the issue of free warrants has been completed following the listing of and quotation for the 250,800,000 free warrants on the ACE Market of Bursa Malaysia.

=== 2012 ===
In December, Asia Media Group made an announcement regarding the new issue of securities. A total of 250,800,000 bonus shares will be listed and quoted on the ACE Market of Bursa Malaysia with effect from 9.00 a.m. on Monday, 31 December 2012.

In October, Asia Media Group Bhd has proposed a corporate exercise consisting of a bonus issue of 250.80 million new shares and a similar number of free warrants. It said the bonus issue would be on the basis of one bonus share for each share held and also one free warrant for every one share held. "For illustration purposes only, assuming the full exercise of 250.80 million warrants at the indicative exercise price of 51.1 sen, the proceeds to be raised by the company is approximately RM128.16mil," it said.

Asia Media Group fell 4% to close at 82 sen on the news that it was queried by the Bursa Malaysia Securities over unusual market activity in the trading of the company's shares on 8 August 2012. The company has seen in sharp rise in price and trading volume as it propose a transfer to the Main Market of Bursa Malaysia. Its shares has consistently been one of the most heavily traded stocks on the local bourse despite the company's listing on the secondary market. The stock has returned 227% in the past year. The company said it was unaware of any rumour or report concerning the business and affairs of the group that may account for the sudden rise, except for its recent announcements pertaining to the proposed transfer of its listing to the Main Market of Bursa Malaysia, which is still pending the approval from the relevant authorities.

In May, Asia Media Group won The BrandLaureate BestBrands Awards 2011-2012: Best Brand in Media - Transit TV Network.

In April 2012, Asia Media Group expects its proposed listing transfer to the Main Market of Bursa Malaysia to be completed by the third quarter of this year. In a filing to Bursa Malaysia on 2 April 2012, the company said it has met the financial criteria for the transfer, having an aggregate audited consolidated net profit of RM28.65 million over the past three financial years to 30 December 2011.

In February 2012, Dato' Ricky Wong, CEO and founder of Asia Media, was again listed in this year's Top 10 ACE Market millionaires list by Malaysian Business magazine in its February 2012 issue. He moves up from number ten(10) position to number five (5) in this year's ranking. Also in the same month, Asia Media Group will seek regulatory approval to move to the Main Market of Bursa Malaysia. Asia Media Group plans to do so by the second quarter of 2012.

=== 2011 ===
In November 2011, Asia Media started testing live television broadcast on 30 buses in Klang Valley. Once the testing has been completed, Asia Media intends to use the technology on all the buses and trains.

In April 2011, Malaysia's Prime Minister, Dato' Sri Najib Razak announces that Asia Media will invest RM500 million in developing the 1st Digital Live Transit-TV Broadcasting infrastructure in Malaysia during the 5th Economic Transformation Programme (ETP) update. This project is expected to generate RM604 million in gross national income and create 400 jobs by 2020.

In March 2011, Dato' Ricky Wong, CEO of Asia Media Group announce its plan to expand its services to Singapore by year-end. Asia Media Group is planning to invest at least RM30 million to expand its digital-TV transit business across the causeway by year-end. Besides Singapore, Asia Media Group is also interested in venturing to Indonesia next year.

In February 2011, Dato' Ricky Wong, CEO and founder of Asia Media, was listed in this year's Top 10 ACE Market millionaires list by Malaysian Business magazine in its February 2011 issue.

On 11 January 2011, Asia Media Group made a strong debut on the ACE Market opening at 40 sen, up 74% from its offer price of 23 sen. Subsequently, it closed at 28.5 sen, up 24% from its offer price with 40.92 million shares done.

In January 2011, Asia Media Group, the parent company of Asia Media, a digital out-of-home Transit-TV company, saw the public portion of its initial public offering (IPO) oversubscribed by 21.46 times. The company is en route to being listed on the Ace Market of Bursa Malaysia on 11 January 2011.

=== 2010 ===
In December 2010, Asia Media Group, the parent company of Asia Media, is expected to raise RM23 million en route to a listing on the Ace Market of Bursa Malaysia soon.

In September 2010, Dato' Ricky Wong was announced as the top 3 winner in the worldwide JCI - Creative Young Entrepreneur Award 2010.

In August 2010, Asia Media's CEO Dato' Ricky Wong was awarded the Malaysia JCI - Creative Young Entrepreneur Award 2010.

In July 2010, Asia Media's CEO Dato' Ricky Wong picked up Asia Pacific Entrepreneurship Awards (APEA) 2010 under the category of the Most Promising Entrepreneur Awards.

In April 2010, Asia Media was awarded Three (3) licences from Malaysian Communications and Multimedia Commission (MCMC). They are Network Facilities Providers (NFP Individual), Network Services Providers (NSP Individual) and Content Applications Services Providers (CASP Individual) licenses.

In March 2010, Asia Media featured at the ABU Digital Broadcasting Symposium. Minister of Information, Communication and Culture, Y.B. Dato' Seri Utama Dr. Rais Yatim attended the event.

In January 2010, Asia Media won the SME BrandLaureate Award.

=== 2009 ===
September 2009, Asia Media announced plans to be the first company in Malaysia to deploy Digital Video Broadcasting (DVB) for Transit-TV. The company’s DVB roll-out for Klang Valley is scheduled to be completed by 2010 and extended to Johor Bahru & Penang by 2011.

In September 2009, Asia Media announced plans to start Live Digital Video Broadcasting (DVB) in 2010.

August 2009, Asia Media CEO Dato' Ricky Wong was awarded the 2009 Top 10 Creative Young Entrepreneur Award by Malaysia's Junior Chamber International for the second year running.

Asia Media and The Star (Malaysia)'s Largest Daily Circulating newspaper announced a Joint Media Collaboration in August 2009.

July 2009, Asia Media's CEO Dato' Ricky Wong picked up the 8th Asia Pacific International Entrepreneur Excellence Award 2009 under the category of Leadership Excellence.

In June 2009, Asia Media was awarded the SME100: Malaysia's Fast Moving Companies Award.

In February 2009, Asia Media TV Network was officially launched.

=== 2008 ===
In December 2008, Asia Media was awarded The SME Rising Star Award 2008 by SMI Association of Malaysia.

In October 2008, Asia Media won the best start-up company award by MSC Malaysia and AMTV was certified by the Malaysia Book of Records as "The Biggest Transit-TV Network".

September 2008, Installation of Transit-TV completed for 250 Causeway Link buses.

August 2008, Asia Media's CEO Dato' Ricky Wong received the JCI Creative Young Entrepreneur Award 2008 from Malaysia's Junior Chamber International.

June 2008, Asia Media acquired Transit Vision Holdings Sdn Bhd that operates LCD-TV screens in 200 luxury coaches of Konsortium Transnasional Berhad (Plusliner and Nice++ Express Fleets). Transit Vision Holdings Sdn Bhd was subsequently renamed as Transnet Express Sdn Bhd and operates under the brand of Transnet Ex.

May 2008, Asia Media was awarded the concession to operate Transit-TV in 250 Causeway Link stage buses in Johor Bahru owned by Handal Indah Sdn Bhd, the largest bus operator company in Johor and the only Malaysian company serving the Malaysian-Singapore Causeway.

February 2008, Transit-TV installation completed for the entire fleet of 1,050 RapidKL buses.

January 2008, Official launch of Transnet KL Transit-TV at Sime Darby Convention Centre.

=== 2007 ===
Asia Media began operations and in September 2007, Asia Media was awarded the concession in a deal worth RM 200 million (USD $62.5 million) to operate the Transit-TV system in 1,050 RapidKL stage buses, the largest integrated public transport company owned by the Ministry of Finance, Malaysia. In October 2007, Asia Media was awarded MSC status by the Multimedia Development Corporation of Malaysia.

== Corporate Social Responsibility Initiatives ==
Asia Media is regularly involved in community projects and the company's Corporate Social Responsibility initiatives include:

- Crime Prevention Programs – Asia Media with Royal Malaysian Police has infused crime prevention programs that are aimed at informing and educating the public on safety procedures whilst in the home, travelling to and fro from work. Asia Media will also be co-producing programs and bulletins on missing persons and wanted persons and a most wanted list will be periodically released.

In January 2008, details of a local girl – Sharlinie Mohd Nashar – who went missing were flashed on Asia Media Transit-TV screens, with around 12 million commuters a month seeing the alerts.

- Public Announcements - Asia Media also works with several ministries and non-governmental organisations to give free public announcements through Asia Media Transit-TV.
- Airtime Sponsorship of Environmental Conservation Causes – Asia Media collaborates with various non-for-profit organisations to raise awareness and spread the word on environmental conservation via Asia Media Transit-TV screens. Reef Check Malaysia produced a short video-clip that was aired on the buses servicing around Klang Valley in December 2009. Airtime was sponsored by Asia Media in an effort to raise awareness of Coral Reef Conservation.
- Youth Entrepreneurship – Asia Media assist youths by taking part in speaking opportunities, sharing advice, comments and journeys; as well as collaborate with youth organisations to help create initiatives that encourage entrepreneurship, creativity and innovation.

== See also ==
- RoadShow
