= Bursa Malaysia =

Malaysian stock exchange

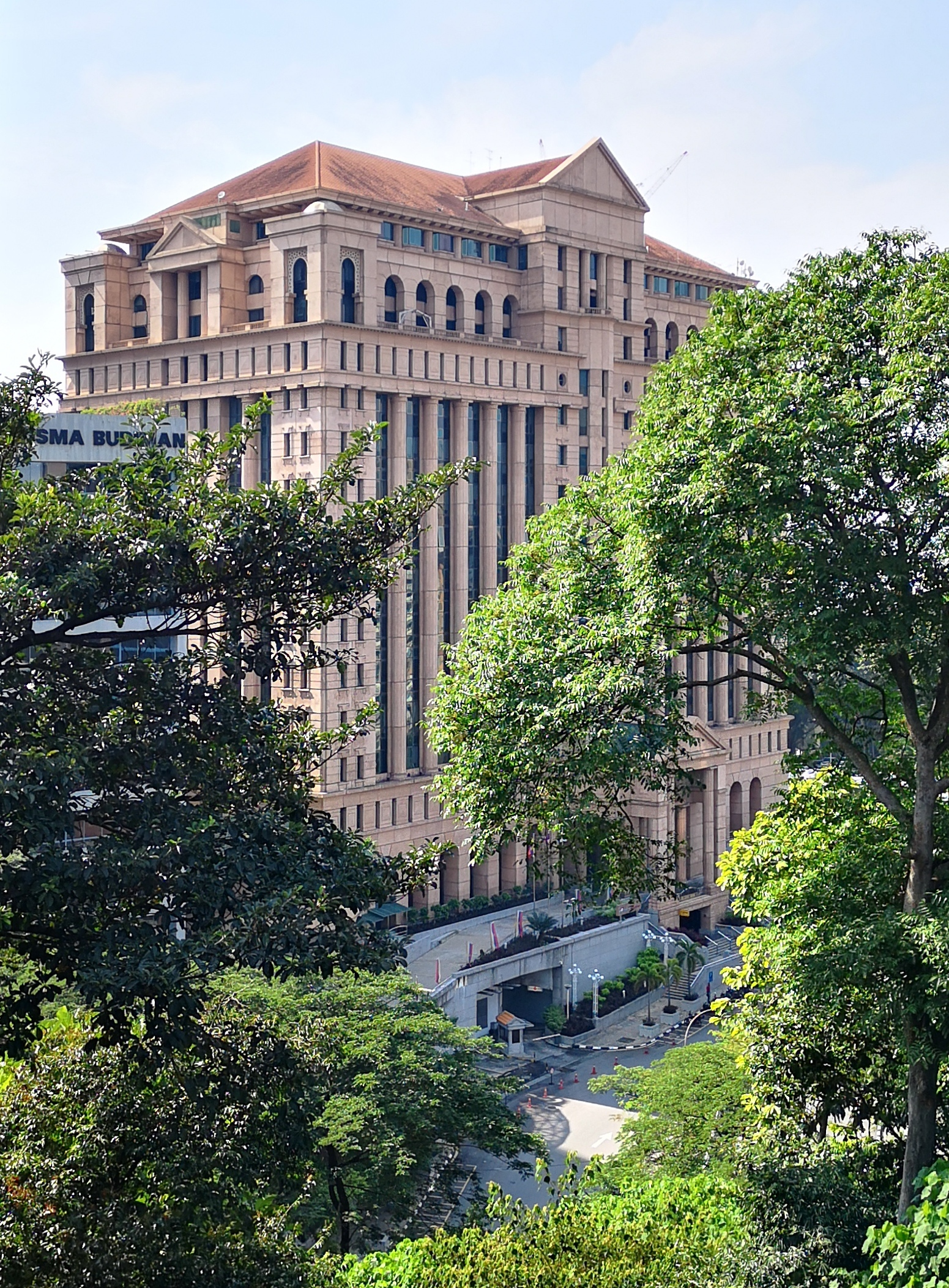
- Bursa Malaysia's headquarters in Kuala Lumpur, Malaysia
- Type: Stock exchange
- Location: Exchange Square, Kuala Lumpur, Malaysia
- Coordinates: 3°8′53.92″N 101°42′4.66″E
- Founded: 1964; 62 years ago
- Key people: Tan Sri Abdul Farid Bin Alias (Chairman); Dato' Fad'l Mohamed (CEO)
- Currency: Ringgit
- No. of listings: 983
- Market cap: US$397.39 billion
- Indices: FTSE Bursa Malaysia KLCI
- Website: www.bursamalaysia.com

Bursa Malaysia (MYX or MSX; lit. 'Malaysian Bourse' or 'Malaysia Exchange') is the stock exchange in Malaysia. It is one of the largest bourses in ASEAN. It is based in Kuala Lumpur and was previously known as the Kuala Lumpur Stock Exchange (KLSE). It provides full integration of transactions, offering a wide range of currency exchange and related services, including trading, settlement, clearing and savings services.

Along with the Securities Commission of Malaysia, the stock exchange regulates the capital market in Malaysia and, through its facilities, upholds the duty to manage and maintain order in the trading of stocks, bonds and derivatives.

== History ==
Bursa Malaysia was established in 1930, when the Singapore Stockbrokers Association became an official organisation of securities in Malaya. In 1937, it was re-registered as the Stockbrokers' Association of Malaya, but it still did not trade public shares. In 1960, the Malayan Stock Exchange was formed and public trading started on 9 May that year. In 1961, a board system was introduced in two trading places, one in Singapore and one in Kuala Lumpur. The two trading rooms were linked by direct telephone lines into a single market with the same stocks and shares listed at a single set of prices on both boards.

The Malaysian Stock Exchange was formally formed in 1964, and in the following year, with the separation of Singapore from Malaysia, the stock exchange continued to function under the Malaysian and Singapore Stock Exchange (MSSE).

In 1973, with the termination of currency interchangeability between Malaysia and Singapore, the SEMS was separated into the Kuala Lumpur Stock Exchange Bhd (KLSEB) and the Stock Exchange of Singapore (SES). Malaysian companies continued to be listed on SES and vice versa. A new company limited by guarantee, The Kuala Lumpur Stock Exchange (KLSE) took over operations of KLSEB as the stock exchange. In 1994, it was renamed Kuala Lumpur Stock Exchange.

It also fully suspended the trading of CLOB (Central Limit Order Book) counters, indefinitely freezing approximately US$4.47 billion worth of shares and affecting 172,000 investors, most of them Singaporeans.

Kuala Lumpur Stock Exchange (KLSE) was demutualised and was renamed Bursa Malaysia in 2004. It consists of a Main Board, a Second Board and MESDAQ (now ACE Market) with total market capitalisation of (USD397.39 billion).

On 7 May 2024, Bursa Malaysia hit RM2 trillion in market capitalisation for the first time.

== See also ==
- Economy of Malaysia
- Asia-Pacific Central Securities Depository Group
- CCP Global
- List of ASEAN stock exchanges by market capitalization
- List of stock exchanges in the Commonwealth of Nations
- List of stock exchanges
