= Colleges within universities in the United Kingdom =

Colleges within universities in the United Kingdom can be divided into two broad categories: those in federal universities such as the University of London, which are primarily teaching institutions joined in a federation, and residential colleges in universities following (to a greater or lesser extent) the traditional collegiate pattern of Oxford and Cambridge, which may have academic responsibilities but are primarily residential and social. The legal status of colleges varies widely, both with regard to their corporate status and their status as educational bodies. London colleges are all considered 'recognised bodies' with the power to confer University of London degrees and, in many cases, their own degrees. Colleges of Oxford, Cambridge, Durham and the University of the Highlands and Islands (UHI) are listed bodies, as "bodies that appear to the Secretary of State to be constituent colleges, schools, halls or other institutions of a university". Colleges of the plate glass universities of Lancaster and York, along with those of the University of Roehampton and the University of the Arts London do not have this legal recognition. Colleges of Cambridge, London, and the UHI, along with all but three Oxford colleges and the recognised colleges of Durham, are separate corporations, while the colleges of other universities, the maintained colleges of Durham, and the societies of the university at Oxford are parts of their parent universities and do not have independent corporate existence.

In the past, many of what are now British universities with their own degree-awarding powers were colleges which had their degrees either awarded by a federal university (such as Cardiff University) or validated by another university (for example many of the post-1992 universities). Colleges that had (or have) courses validated by a university are not normally considered to be colleges of that university; similarly the redbrick universities that, as university colleges, prepared students for University of London external degrees were not considered colleges of that university. Some universities (e.g. Cardiff University) refer to their academic faculties as "colleges"; such purely academic subdivisions are not within the scope of this article.

== Residential colleges ==
Some universities have colleges that are primarily residential and social, although they may also provide teaching. Such universities are commonly known as collegiate universities.

=== Historical development ===
==== Ancient and early modern colleges ====
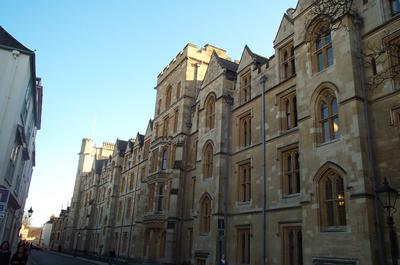
New College, Oxford, the first English college to admit undergraduates and offer tutorials

The two ancient universities of England, Oxford and Cambridge (collectively termed Oxbridge), both became organised as universities in the early 13th century, prior to the founding of the first colleges. The idea of colleges was imported to England by William of Durham from the University of Paris, where colleges had existed since the foundation of the Collège des Dix-Huit in 1180, who left money to establish University College, Oxford, in 1149. The first college at Cambridge, Peterhouse, followed in 1284. These early colleges were residential institutions for postgraduates; teaching in colleges, another innovation imported from Paris (pioneered by the College of Navarre in 1305), arrived in England with the establishment of New College, Oxford, in 1379, also the first English college to admit undergraduates. However, throughout the Middle Ages only a minority of students at Oxford and Cambridge – estimated to be between 10 and 20 per cent – were members of colleges.

While colleges flourished at the two English universities, this was not the case in Scotland, where only the University of St Andrews developed more than one college. As a result, the Scottish universities developed into college-universities where the university and the college were merged into a single entity. The Scottish use of principal for the executive head of the university is derived from the title of principal regent (or just principal) of the college in the medieval university, which was headed by the rector. Some later institutions, such as Marischal College, Aberdeen, and Trinity College, Dublin, were explicitly founded as college-universities, becoming a pattern for the colonial colleges in the US.

The University of St Andrews, Scotland's oldest university, grew to three colleges by 1537. By the time of the Scottish Reformation in 1560, almost all students were resident in a college and the colleges had mostly taken over the teaching of the ministry. Two of the colleges merged in 1747, and the colleges ceased to be residential in the early 19th century, after a period of attempting to enforce residence on students, and meals in the colleges, which had been on-and-off for a while, stopped for good by 1820.

By the time of Queen Elizabeth I, the statutes of Cambridge University implied that every student was a member of a college. At around the same time, the heads of the Oxford colleges gained their first statutory power under the chancellorship of Robert Dudley.

The importance of the colleges at the English universities continued to grow, with the Hebdomadal Board (of college heads) being set up by Archbishop William Laud as chancellor of Oxford University in 1631, in order to reduce the power of congregation and convocation. The Laudian Code of 1636 also made it obligatory for students at Oxford to join a college or hall.

==== 19th century innovation and reform ====
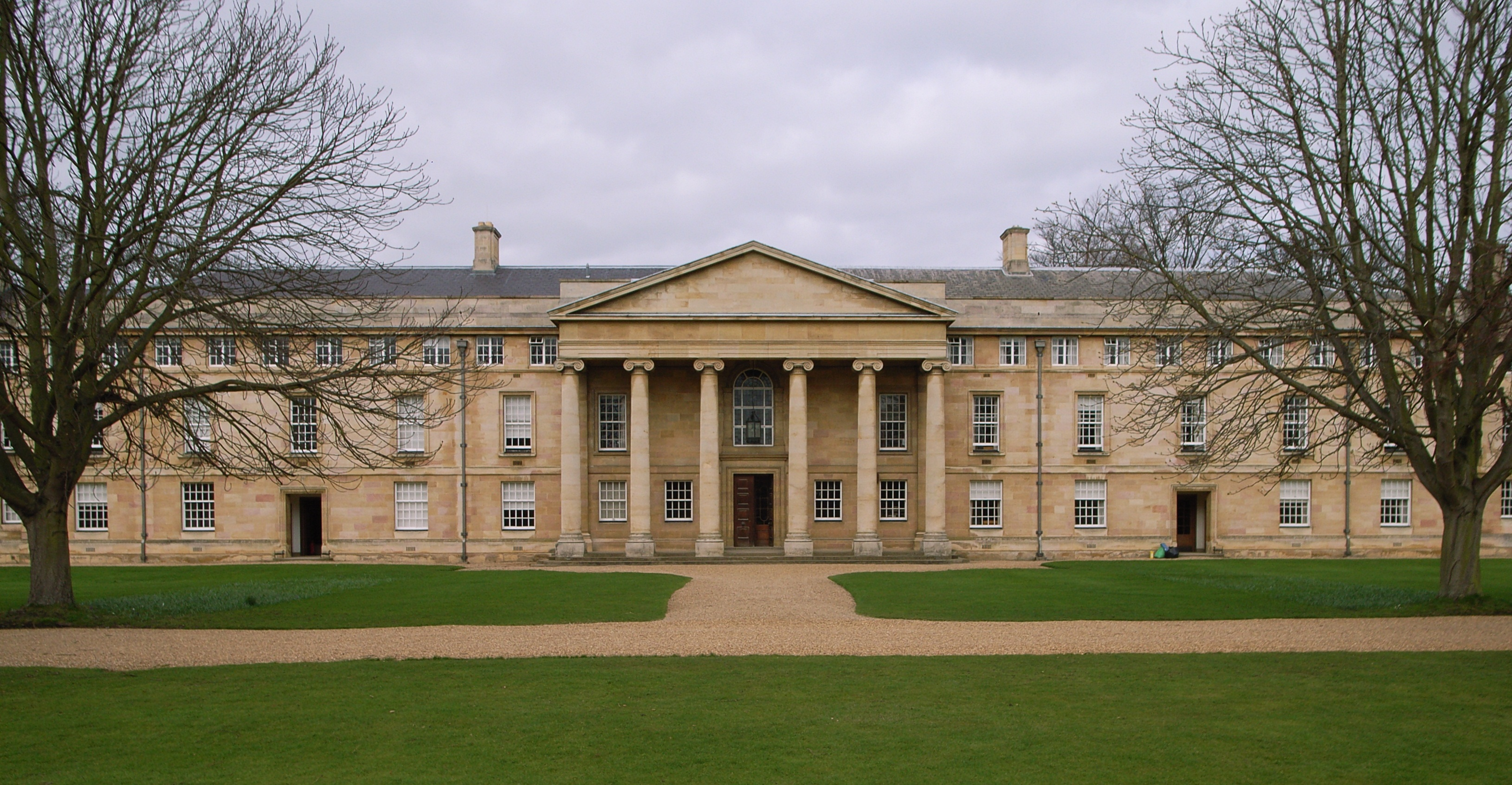
Downing College, Cambridge, founded in 1800 as the first new college at the university for over 200 years

The two ancient universities of England thus evolved into federations of autonomous colleges, with a small central university body, rather than universities in the common sense. This led to calls for reform in the 19th century, with speeches in the House of Commons saying that the "colleges [had] usurped the legislative functions of the universities", while Sir William Hamilton wrote of Oxford that, due to the teaching being carried out by college tutors rather than university professors, "The University is in abeyance... In none of its faculties is it supposed that the professors furnish any longer the instruction necessary for a degree. ... It is not even pretended that Oxford now applies more than the preliminary of an academical education. Even this is not afforded by the University, but abandoned to the Colleges and Halls; and the Academy of Oxford is thus not one public Universities, but merely a collection of private schools."

The only university to establish a residential college system in Britain during the 19th century was Durham University, although University Hall, a quasi-collegiate hall of residence, was established in London by the Unitarians in 1849 for students at University College London, and similar quasi-collegiate halls were established in Manchester towards the end of the 19th century for students at Owens College.

Durham University was founded in 1832, a year after Hamilton had written that article. It followed the example of Oxford and Cambridge with respect to residence (while departing significantly from it in other respects), pursuing a collegiate model from the start. Two important innovations were, however, made that were later taken up for the colleges of the plate glass universities (below) and the residential colleges of US universities: Firstly, teaching was organised centrally, following the Scottish pattern, rather than in the colleges, with the colleges being residential and responsible for student discipline, as had originally been the case at Oxford and Cambridge. Charles Thorp, the first warden (head) of the university, stated that the professors "have the charge of the studies in their respective departments and work as at Glasgow and the foreign Universities, and as they did at Oxford in old times"; and while the professorial teaching was supplemented by tutorials, the tutors were under the direction of the professors, as Hamilton had proposed. Secondly, the colleges at Durham were (starting with the original University College) owned by the university rather than being independent like Oxbridge colleges. This aspect of the Durham model, in particular, was later adopted for residential colleges at US universities and has been described as "a far better model for people at other institutions to look to, than are the independent colleges of Oxford and Cambridge".

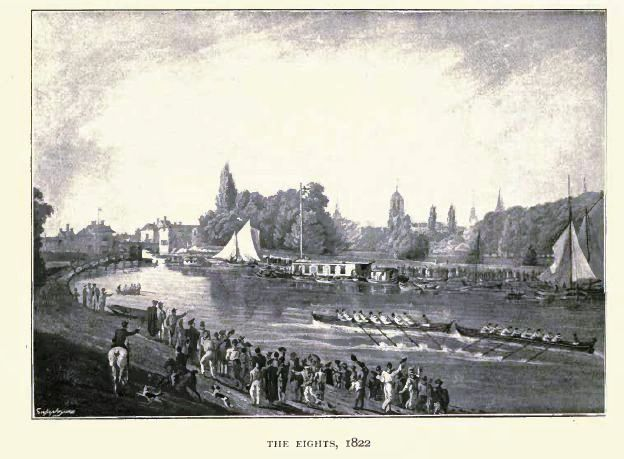
Two Oxford college eights, thought to be Brasenose and Jesus, pictured racing in 1822

Inter-collegiate sport started with rowing at Oxford, where the first known competition was in 1815 with Brasenose College winning and Jesus College being possibly their only competitor. Inter-collegiate rowing spread to Cambridge in 1827 and to Durham in 1850. Over the course of the 19th century more sports were taken up by the colleges and competitions, including many of the cuppers at Oxford and Cambridge, were well established in sports such rugby, football, cricket, tennis and fives at all three universities by the end of the century.

Whitelands College, later a college of the University of Roehampton, was founded in London in 1841 by the National Society for Promoting Religious Education as a residential teacher training college. It opened in January 1842 as the first teacher training college for women in England.

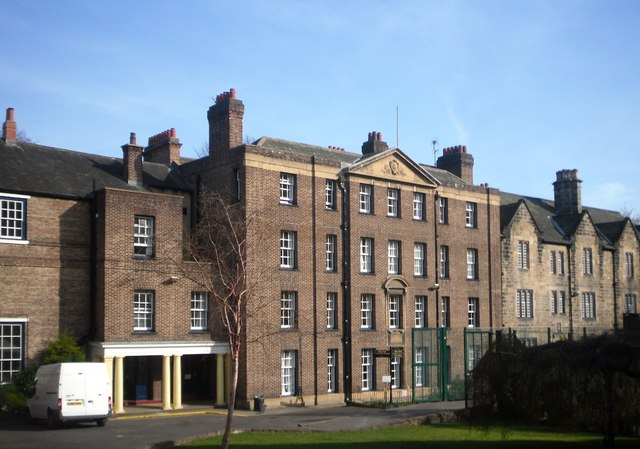
Hatfield College, Durham, founded as Bishop Hatfield's Hall by David Melville in 1846 to provide a more economical residence for students

Another innovation was introduced at Durham with the founding of Bishop Hatfield's Hall in 1846. The founding principal, David Melville, instituted a system of economy with the aim of allowing men who could not otherwise have afforded it to attend university. This has been called "arguably the single most successful and influential undertaking at Durham throughout the nineteenth century" apart from the university's foundation. It relied on three innovations: rooms were let furnished, with shared servants, rather than students employing their own servants; all meals were taken in the dining hall, rather than students eating in their rooms; the price of room and board was reasonable and fixed in advance. Melville also pioneered the use of single-room study-bedrooms rather than the "set" of multiple rooms previously used by students. In 1848, Charles Marriott advocated that a similar hall should be established at Oxford; this eventually happened with the establishment of Keble College in 1870, which would go on to inspire a similar model of economy at Selwyn College, Cambridge. Melville's innovation subsequently became the standard model for residential accommodation at universities around the world. In 1852, the royal commission established to look into the University of Oxford found that "The success that has attended Mr. Melville's labours in Hatfield Hall at Durham is regarded as a conclusive argument for imitating that institution in Oxford"; this report led to a requirement in the Oxford University Act 1854 that Oxford allow the establishment of private halls, although these halls were never very successful. The Cambridge University Act 1856, following the recommendations of a royal commission looking into that university, similarly made provision for the establishment of private hostels.

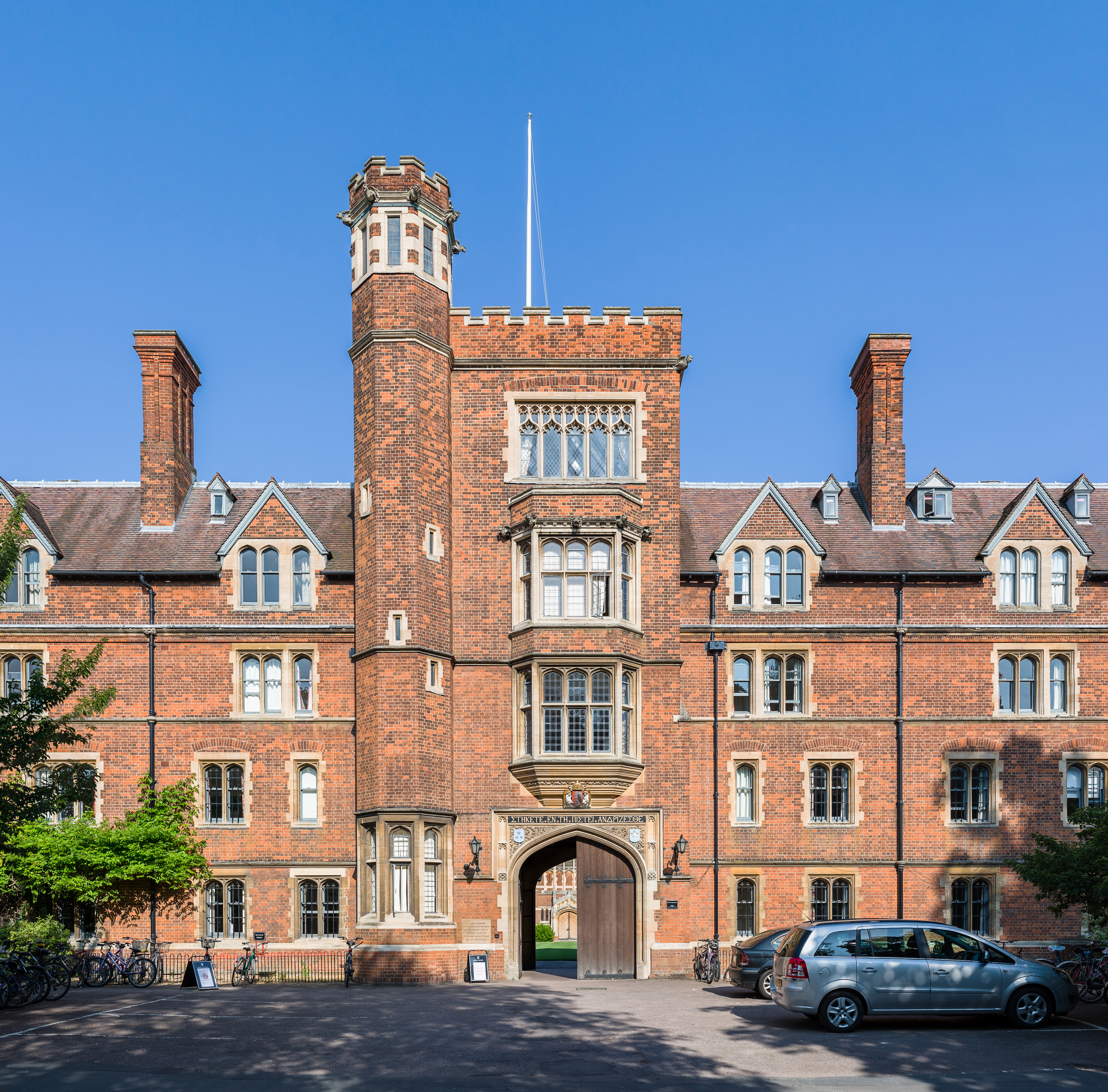
Selwyn College, Cambridge, originally founded as a hostel for non-collegiate students

The main thrust of the royal commissions, however, was to curtail the power of the colleges, putting more of the governance of the universities back into the hands of their teachers. The number of professors, and the range of subjects taught, was expanded, although most undergraduate teaching remained with college lecturers.

The commissions also recommended allowing students to join the universities without having to join a college. Oxford led the way, admitting non-collegiate students from 1868, followed by Cambridge in 1869. Durham, possibly influenced by Archbishop Tait who had been a strong advocate for admission of unattached students on the Oxford commission, admitted non-collegiate students over the age of 23 from 1871. At Oxford, the non-collegiate students formed themselves into the Clarendon University Club, named after their meeting place. This had moved to St Catharine’s Hall by 1874, becoming known as the St Catharine’s Club. The unattached men at Durham similarly organised themselves by the 1880s into a society, which became known as St Cuthbert's Society in 1888; this gained a room in Cosin's Hall as a base in 1892. At Cambridge, the university bought Fitzwilliam Hall for the use of the non-collegiate students in 1887.

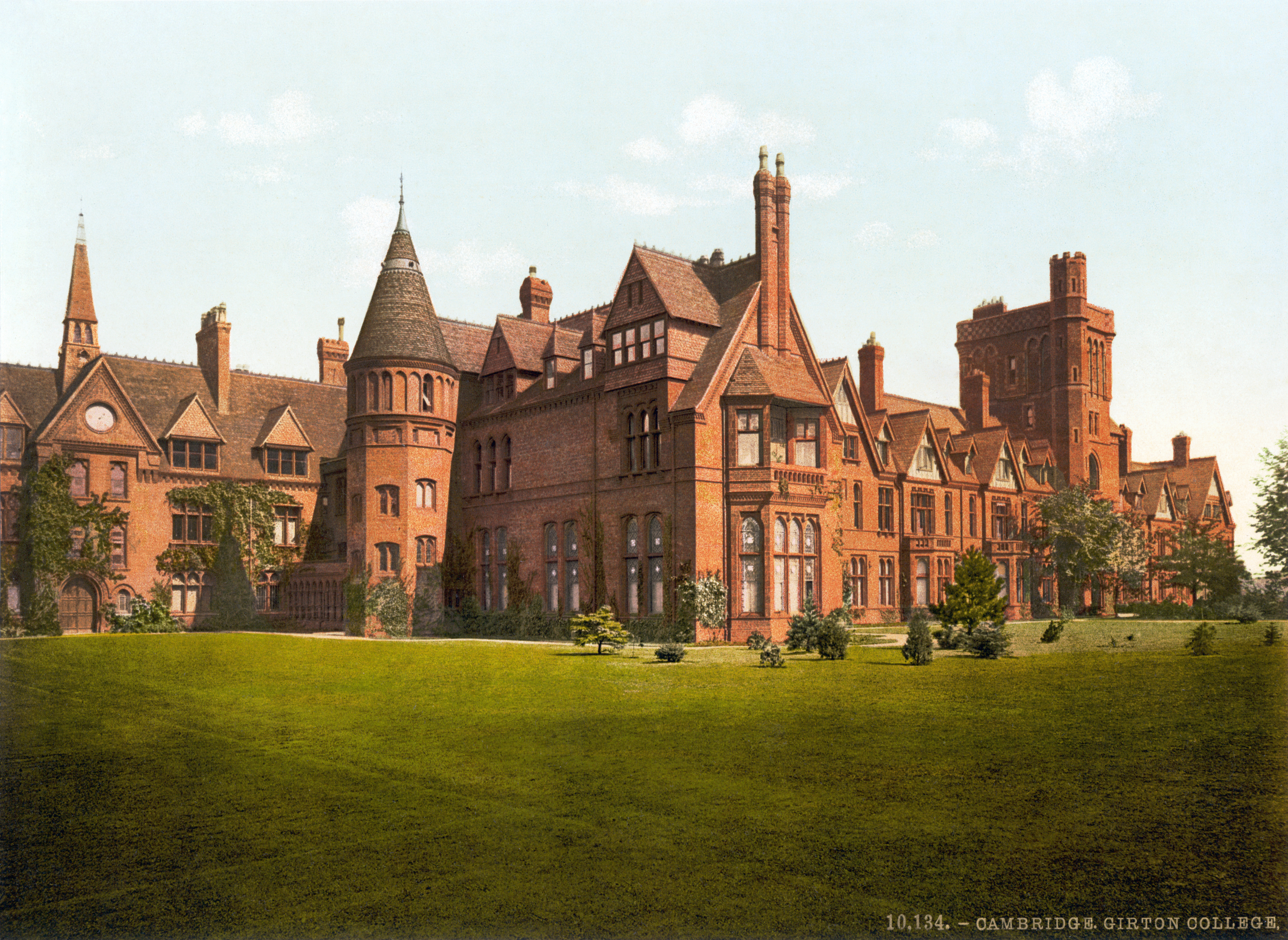
A restored image from the 1890s of Girton College, the first residential college for women

The first residential college for women, Girton, was established near Cambridge in 1869, followed by Newnham in 1871. The first at Oxford were Somerville and Lady Margaret Hall, both founded in 1879. The Society of Oxford Home-Students was formed for women not resident at a women's college in 1879, although women could not matriculate at Oxford until 1920. No women's colleges were established at Durham until after it received a supplemental charter in 1895 opening its degrees to women. In 1896, St Hild's College, the Diocese of Durham's teacher training college for women, was brought into connection with the university, allowing its students to take degrees. Non-collegiate women were first admitted to Durham in 1897 as "home students", under their own censor, but numbers never rose above ten until after the second world war and no society was established until 1947. The Women's Hostel was established in 1899 and formally became a college in 1919, changing its name to St Mary's College. Four women's colleges at Oxford received royal charters and formally became colleges of the university in 1926, although they would not be given full college status until 1959. At Cambridge, Newnham received a royal charter in 1917 and Girton in 1924 but they were not recognised as colleges of the university until 1948.

==== 20th century development ====
Following the first world war, the University Grants Committee was established in 1919 to fund universities. Oxford and Cambridge did not receive funding until after the royal commission into both universities in 1922 but when they were approved to receive funding it was paid to the universities rather than to the colleges, shifting the financial balance towards the central administration. Oxford replaced the status of private hall with that of permanent private hall in 1918, and Cambridge replaced public hostels with approved foundations in 1926. Oxford also redefined its non-collegiate students as "societies". The non-collegiate men were formed into St Catherine's Society in 1931, based on the St Catharine's Club the students had established earlier, while the non-collegiate women in the Society of Home Students became St Anne's Society in 1942.

An increase in funding for students after the second world war made university education more affordable, undermining the rationale behind opening up the universities to non-collegiate students and leading to almost all of the non-collegiate bodies beginning colleges in the 1950s and 1960s. At Oxford, the two societies became St Anne's College and St Catherine's College in 1952 and 1963 respectively. At Cambridge, the decision was made as early as 1944 to develop Fitzwilliam House (as it had been renamed in 1924) into a college, with this being accomplished by 1966. At Durham, the non-collegiate students were organised into two recognised societies in 1947, each under a principal: St Aidan's Society for women, which went on to become St Aidan's College in 1961, and St Cuthbert's Society – already organised by the students themselves in 1888 but now brought under the control of the university – for men. St Cuthbert's Society was an exception in that it did not become a college in the 1950s or 1960s, although it accreted accommodation from 1951 onwards.

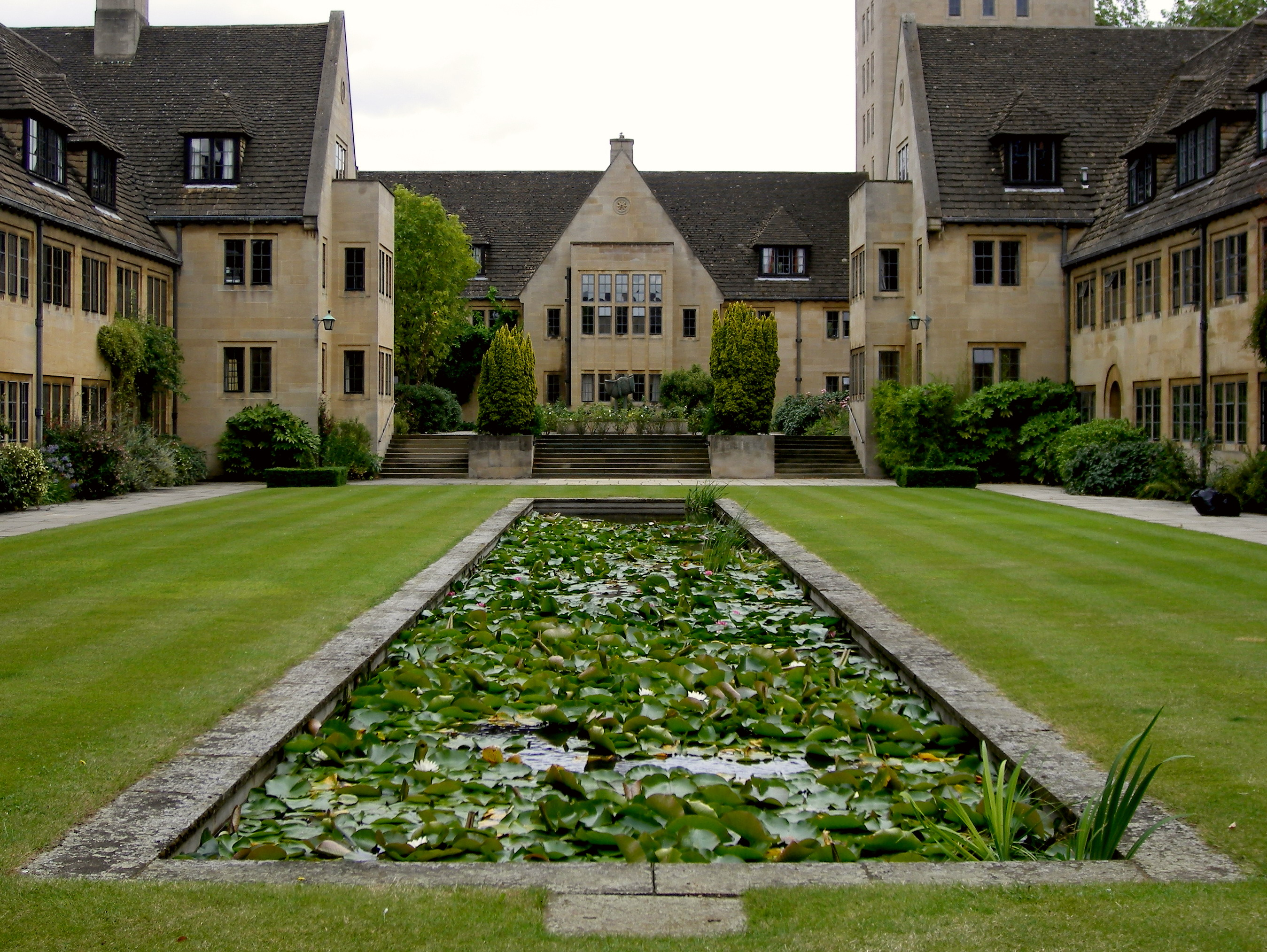
Nuffield College, Oxford, the first postgraduate college, the first mixed college and the first specialist college

The first postgraduate-only college of the modern era, and the first mixed college, was Nuffield College, established at Oxford in 1937, although it did not open until 1945 due to the war. It was also the first specialist college, specialising in the social sciences. After the war, the next postgraduate college founded was St Antony's College, Oxford, in 1950, specialising in area studies. Postgraduate colleges flourished in the 1960s, with four founded in Oxford (three initially owned by the university, although two of these latter gained royal charters, and a specialist centre for management studies), three at Cambridge (starting with Darwin College in 1964, also Cambridge's first mixed college; two were established by existing colleges and one by the central university), and one at Durham (the Graduate Society in 1965, also Durham's first mixed college).

The post-war period also saw the establishment of new undergraduate colleges for men and women at Cambridge and Durham. This also saw debates in both universities about whether the new men's colleges of the 1950s should specialise in science and technology: these were the drivers of the university expansion, with the University Grants Committee insisting until 1967 that two thirds of new student places should be in these fields. There had already been debate about the merits of specialist colleges following the establishment of Nuffield College in Oxford, where this – rather than it being mixed or involving non-academics in its work – was said to have "proved particularly unpopular" among more conservative academics. For both Grey College, Durham, (opened 1959) and Churchill College, Cambridge, (opened 1961) the decisions were to retain a full subject mix, although Churchill was permitted to be weighted towards science and technology, with 70% of its students in those fields, while Grey took an approximately equal split of science and arts students.

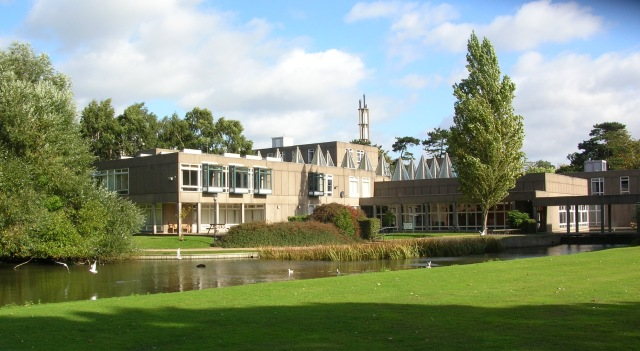
Derwent College, one of the founding colleges of the University of York

Three of the seven plateglass universities established as part of the expansion of universities in the 1960s adopted residential college systems, while the others built non-collegiate halls of residence. Collegiate systems survive in two of these, Lancaster and York, while Kent moved away from the collegiate system (see § Former collegiate universities below). The plate-glass universities followed Durham in creating colleges that were part of the university, rather than independent foundations, and that were not directly involved in teaching.

The colleges of the plateglass universities were mixed from their foundation, before any of the undergraduate colleges of the older universities. The first colleges established were at Lancaster, where Bowland and Lonsdale were founded alongside the university in 1964. However, although students were assigned to the colleges, the first college residential buildings did not open until 1968. 1965 saw the first actually co-residential undergraduate colleges open, with the two founding colleges at York (Langwith and Derwent) as well as Eliot College, Kent.

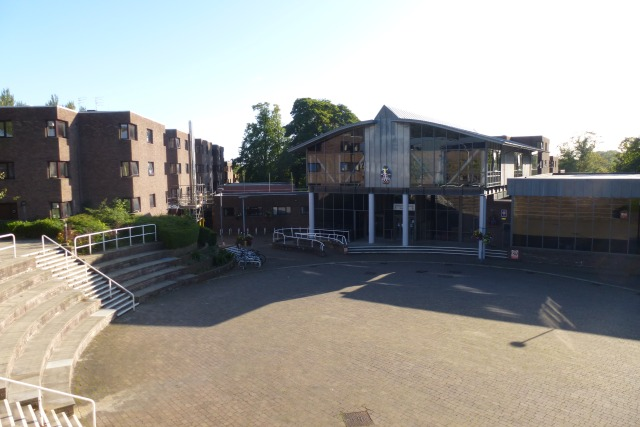
Collingwood College, Durham, the first college founded as mixed at Durham, had the first mixed-sex corridors at a British university

The first undergraduate collegiate body to become mixed at the older universities was the still primarily non-residential St Cuthbert's Society, Durham, in 1969. It was not until the age of majority was reduced from 21 to 18 in 1970, and the universities ceased to be in loco parentis, that the undergraduate residential colleges began to become mixed. In 1972, two men's colleges at Cambridge and one at Durham became mixed, and Collingwood College, Durham, opened as the first mixed undergraduate college founded at the older universities and the first British university residence to have mixed-sex corridors. The first five undergraduate colleges at Oxford became mixed in 1974. The only undergraduate college to have been founded as mixed at either Oxford or Cambridge was Robinson College, Cambridge, which opened in 1981.

The first women's college to go mixed was Girton, which admitted men to its fellowships in 1977, as postgraduates in 1978, and as undergraduates in 1979. The last all-male colleges at Oxford (excluding permanent private halls) went mixed in 1986, and the last at Cambridge and Durham in 1988.

Reforms of teacher training in the 1970s caused disruption for teacher training colleges, many of which ended up meeting o'r being absorbed by universities. This affected three independent colleges at Durham, two of which merged and then joined the university to become a maintained college, while the third left the university in 1977 to merge with another college. The changes also caused four teacher training colleges in south west London to federate as the Roehampton Institute of Higher Education, but preserving the individual characters of the four colleges.

==== 21st century ====
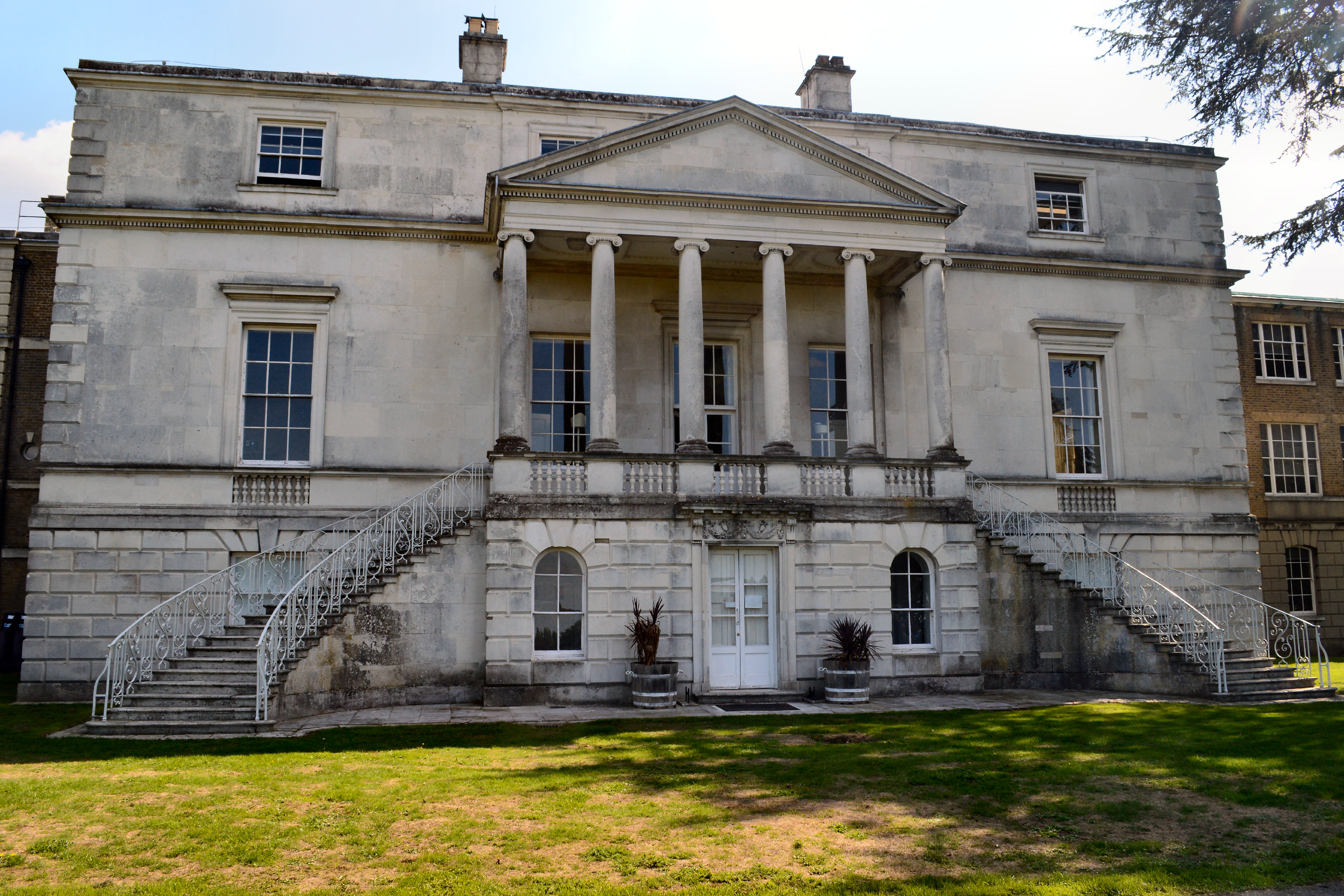
Whitelands College, the oldest constituent college of the University of Roehampton

The Roehampton Institute of Higher Education became part of the Federal University of Surrey in 2000 as the University of Surrey Roehampton, and then became an independent, collegiate university in 2004 as Roehampton University.

The first decade of the 21st century saw the remaining women's colleges at Oxford and Durham become mixed. The last women's college in Durham, St Mary's, became mixed in 2005, while the last at Oxford, St Hilda's, became mixed in 2008. As of 2025, there were two remaining women's colleges at Cambridge: Murray Edwards and Newnham. The last institution at Oxford to become mixed was St Benet's Hall (closed 2022), a permanent private hall rather than a college, which admitted postgraduate women from 2014 and undergraduates from 2016.

Durham shifted its two remaining societies to being colleges in the first decade of the century, ending over a century of (formally) non-collegiate students at the university. The Graduate Society became Ustinov College in 2003 and moved to newly built accommodation in 2005. St Cuthbert's Society then took over the former buildings of Ustinov College in 2006. The university agreed in 2008 that St Cuthbert's could keep the title of "society" in honour of is heritage.

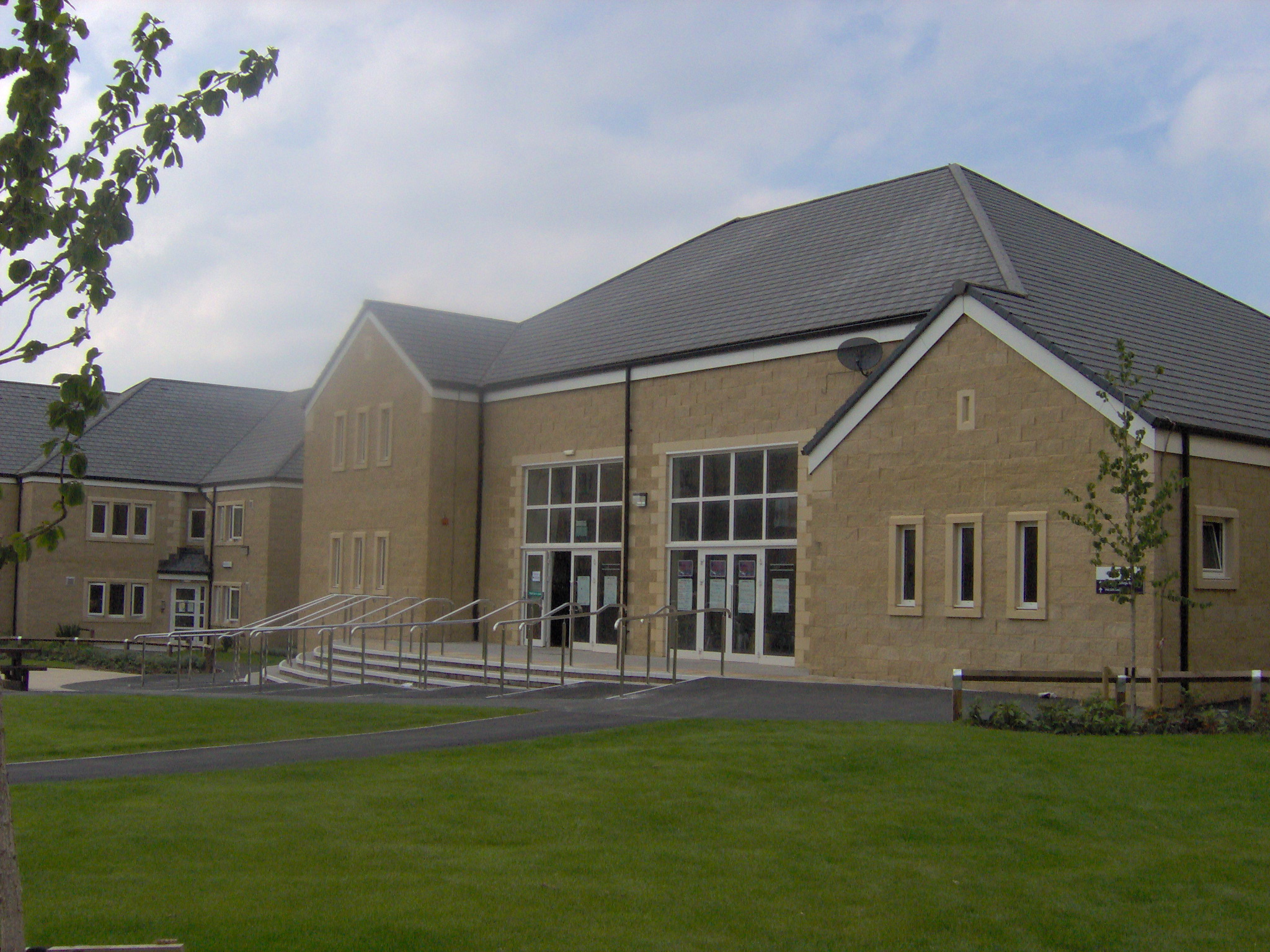
Lonsdale College, Lancaster, a founding college of the university, moved to new buildings in 2004

Colleges continued to be established, with (as of 2025) four new foundations at York, the same number at Durham, and a new (university owned) postgraduate college at Oxford. Two existing colleges also moved to newly constructed sites at Lancaster, as did two at York, allowing the universities to expand. The 21st century saw a move away from college catering towards self-catering, with all of the new colleges being self-catered.

By 2010, Kent had decided that it "could no longer sustain its traditional commitment to its original collegiate foundations". The position of college master was abolished at Kent in 2020, and the university's ordinances were revised in 2025 to remove mention of colleges. York also abolished the post of principal at its colleges in 2023, but retained college councils, now chaired by the senior fellow of the college.

=== Features ===
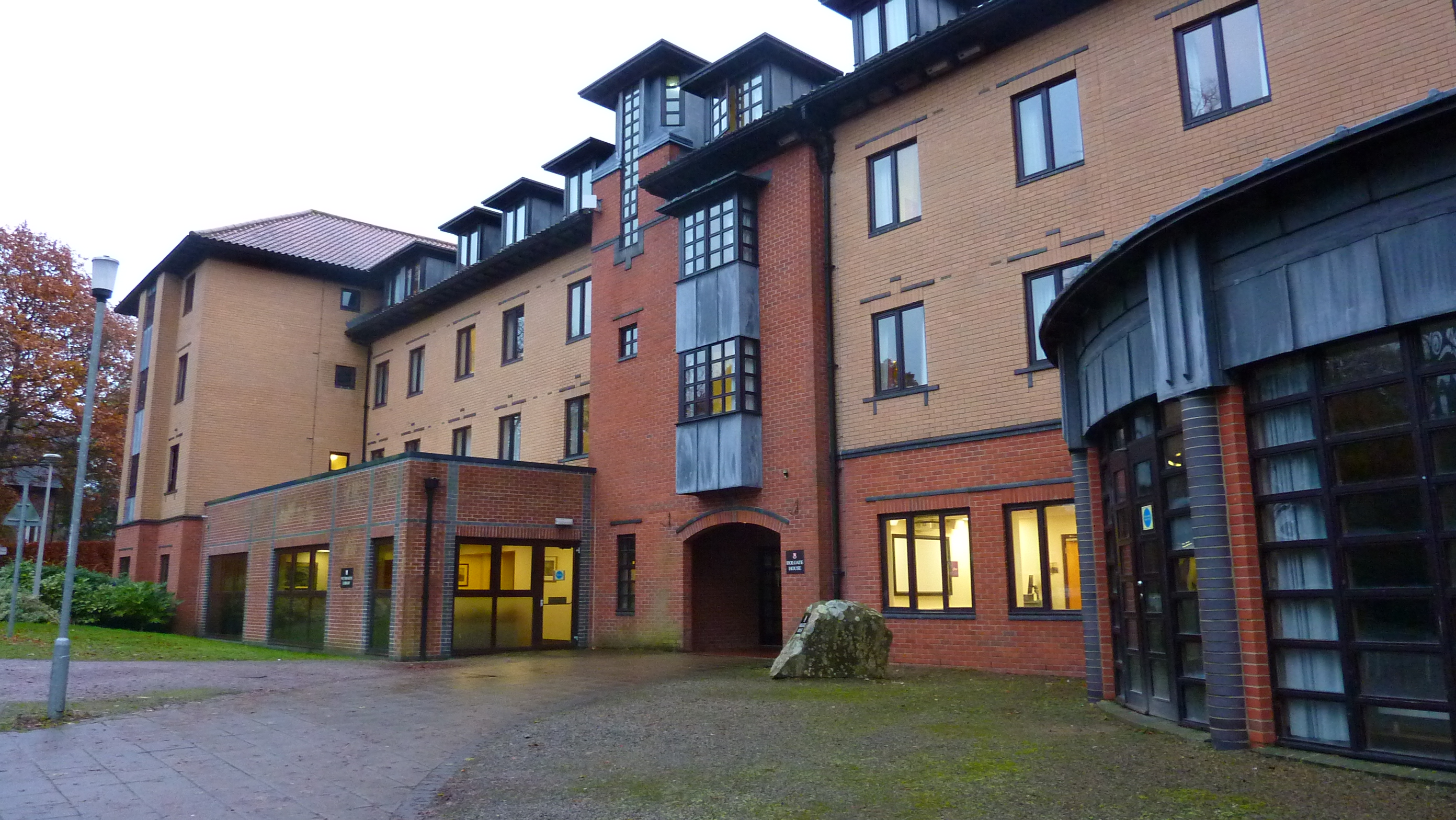
Holgate House accommodation block at Grey College, Durham, with the Victor Watts Library (left) and the Holgate Conference Centre (right) on the ground floor

One of the defining features of residential colleges, as opposed to halls of residence, is that students are members rather than residents, and it is possible (and common at many collegiate universities) to be a member of a college without being resident in that college.

Colleges are normally led by an academic head of college, who will often be a ex officio member of university governing bodies such as the senate, and have other staff such as welfare officers or student support officers that provide pastoral support for students. They will usually have student common rooms, which are representative bodies for the student members of the college (not just those in residence), with associated social spaces and student societies. Colleges have a variety of sports teams, participating in inter-collegiate sport competitions against other colleges. Formal meals are a common feature, with students and academics often wearing academic gowns for these.

Residential colleges typically provide facilities beyond those normally found in a hall of residence. In addition to accommodation blocks, facilities will often include dining halls, libraries and study spaces, chapels and multi-faith rooms, function rooms, launderettes, college shops, bars and cafés, music rooms and performance spaces, and sport and exercise facilities (frequently including a college boathouse).

=== Universities ===
==== University of Oxford ====
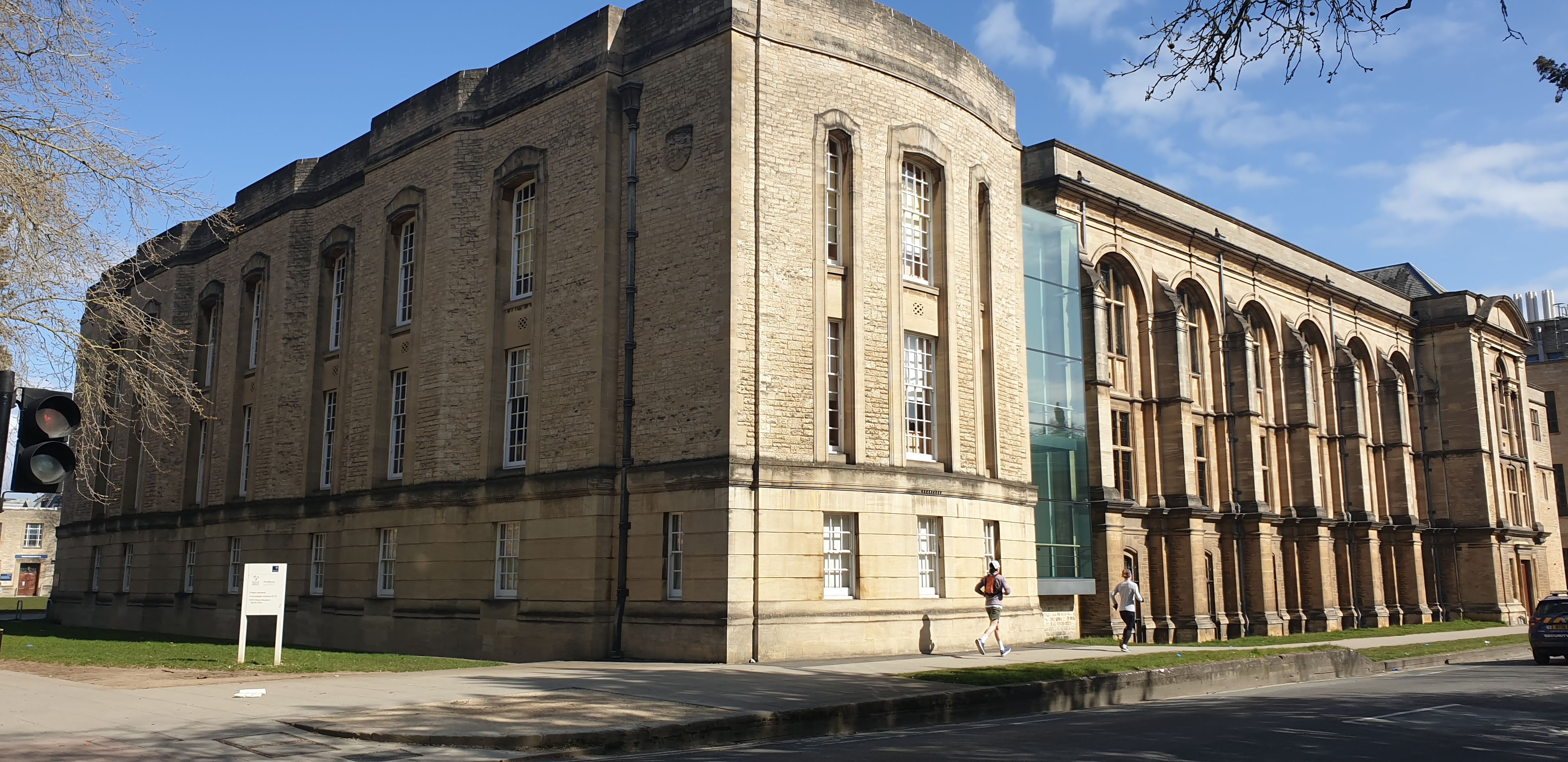
Reuben College, the newest college at Oxford

The University of Oxford has 36 colleges with their own royal charter, three societies owned by the university, and four permanent private halls owned by Christian denominations, all of which are generally referred to as "colleges". While most colleges at Oxford are independent corporations, the three societies (Kellogg College, St Cross College and Reuben College) are established and maintained by the central university; the newest, Reuben College, was formally established in 2019 and admitted its first students in 2021.

Undergraduates are accepted by 30 of the chartered colleges and two of the permanent private halls. One of the 30 colleges, Harris Manchester College, only takes mature students (aged 21 and over). Postgraduates are accepted by 36 of the chartered colleges, including five postgraduate-only colleges, the three societies, which are all postgraduate-only, and the four permanent private halls, two of which are postgraduate-only. One college, All Souls College, is an academic research institute that does not accept students. Undergraduate admissions are formally carried out by colleges, but there is a centralised screening process to decide which applicants to interview and the university has suggested that "in many cases final decisions about who to accept will be taken by departments".

==== University of Cambridge ====
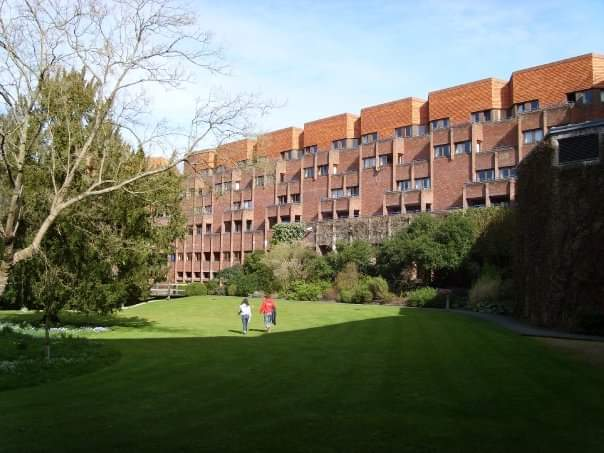
Robinson College, the most recently founded college at Cambridge

There are 31 colleges at the University of Cambridge, all of which are independent corporations with their own royal charter. The university statutes also allow for "approved foundations" and "approved societies", but there are not currently any colleges in these categories. Academic faculties and departments are responsible for lectures, seminars and practical classes.

Cambridge colleges have more autonomy in undergraduate admissions than their counterparts at Oxford, and most applicants will be interviewed. Two of the colleges only admit postgraduates while a further three only take postgraduates and mature undergraduates. Of the remaining 26 that take undergraduates of all ages, two are women's colleges while the others are open.

==== Durham University ====
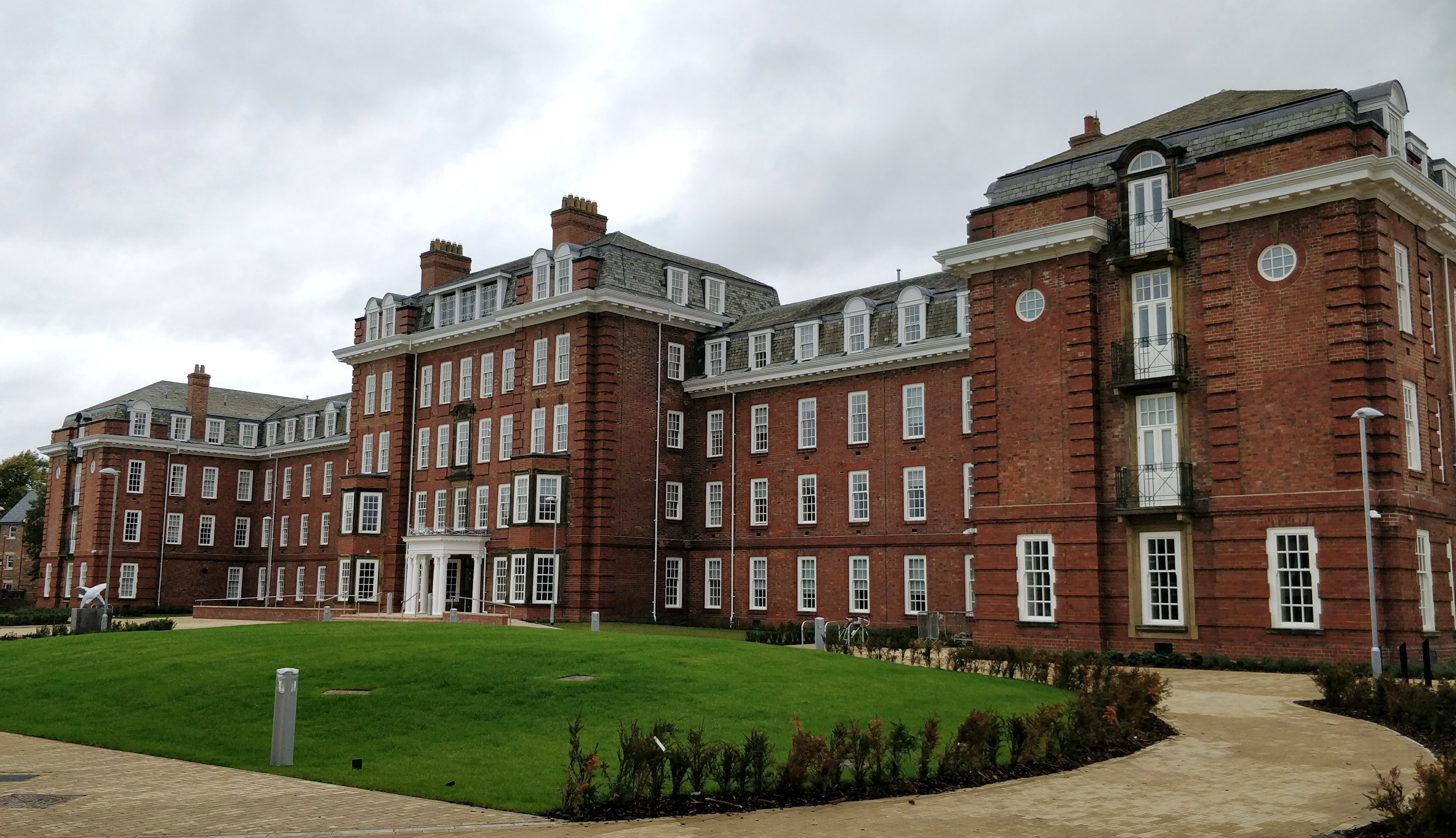
Sheraton Park, home of the university's postgraduate college, Ustinov College, from 2017 and previously home of Neville's Cross College, a licensed hall of the university from 1924 to 1977

The colleges of Durham University hold the same legal status of 'listed bodies' as the colleges of Oxford and Cambridge, although they do not play the same role in the selection of undergraduate students or teaching. Durham's colleges are (with two exceptions) owned by the university. The collegiate nature of the university is explicitly defined in the university's statutes, which can only be modified with permission of the King in Council, with further details defined in the ordinances.

Most colleges at Durham are "maintained colleges" owned by the university. However, there are two independent "recognised colleges", St Chad's and St John's, which are separate legal entities. These operate as colleges of the university under memoranda of understanding that are reviewed every five years. While university teaching is not carried out in any of the colleges, St John's College has teaching in Cranmer Hall, a Church of England theological college; St Chad's College also trained Anglican priests until 1971.

All colleges have a student common room (normally known as the JCR), which is mandated by the university's statutes, and offer college sports and social spaces. Many colleges have libraries and some colleges have chapels or multi-faith rooms. Colleges may be catered or self-catered, but all hold formal meals, for which gowns are worn in most colleges. Each college also has a head of college, who is an ex officio member of the university's senate. The head of college is appointed by the university's council.

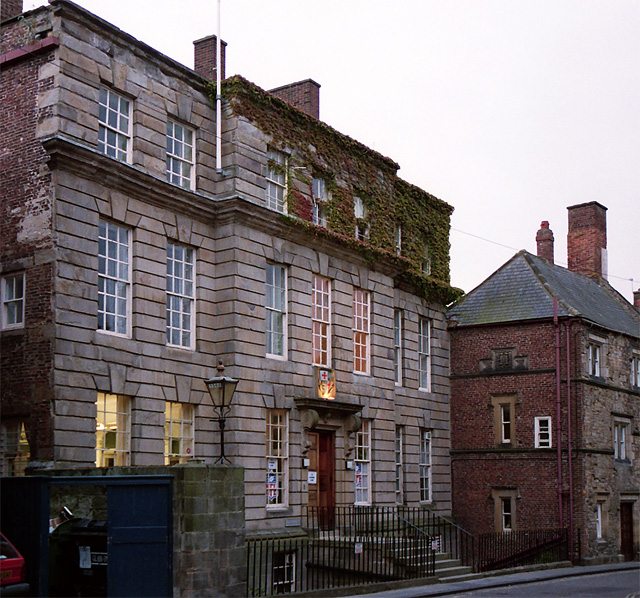
Haughton House, the main building of St John's College, one of the two independent recognised colleges at Durham

Undergraduate applicants who receive an offer from Durham are given the opportunity to rank their college choice. They are then allocated to colleges using an algorithm that tries to balance home and overseas students and the number of students from different departments while taking into account the students' preferences (if they have supplied a ranking). Final colleges are confirmed after A-level results are released.

Since 2020, there have been 17 colleges in Durham city (one, Ustinov, postgraduate only): the 5 Bailey colleges located on the historic peninsula, which are usually thought of as being more traditional; the 10 Hill colleges on Elvet Hill, near the Mountjoy site on the south side of Durham; Ustinov College in Neville's Cross; and the College of St Hild and St Bede (Hild Bede), temporarily located in Rushford Court to the west of the city centre while its Leazes Road site on the north bank of the Wear is renovated. Two colleges previously based at the Queen's Campus in Stockton-on-Tees relocated to Durham over 2017–2018, and the 17th college, South College, opened in September 2020. Once the renovations to Hild Bede are complete, it is planned that Rushford Court will become Durham's 18th college, while a 19th college will be constructed next to Hild Bede on the Leazes Road site..

==== Lancaster University ====
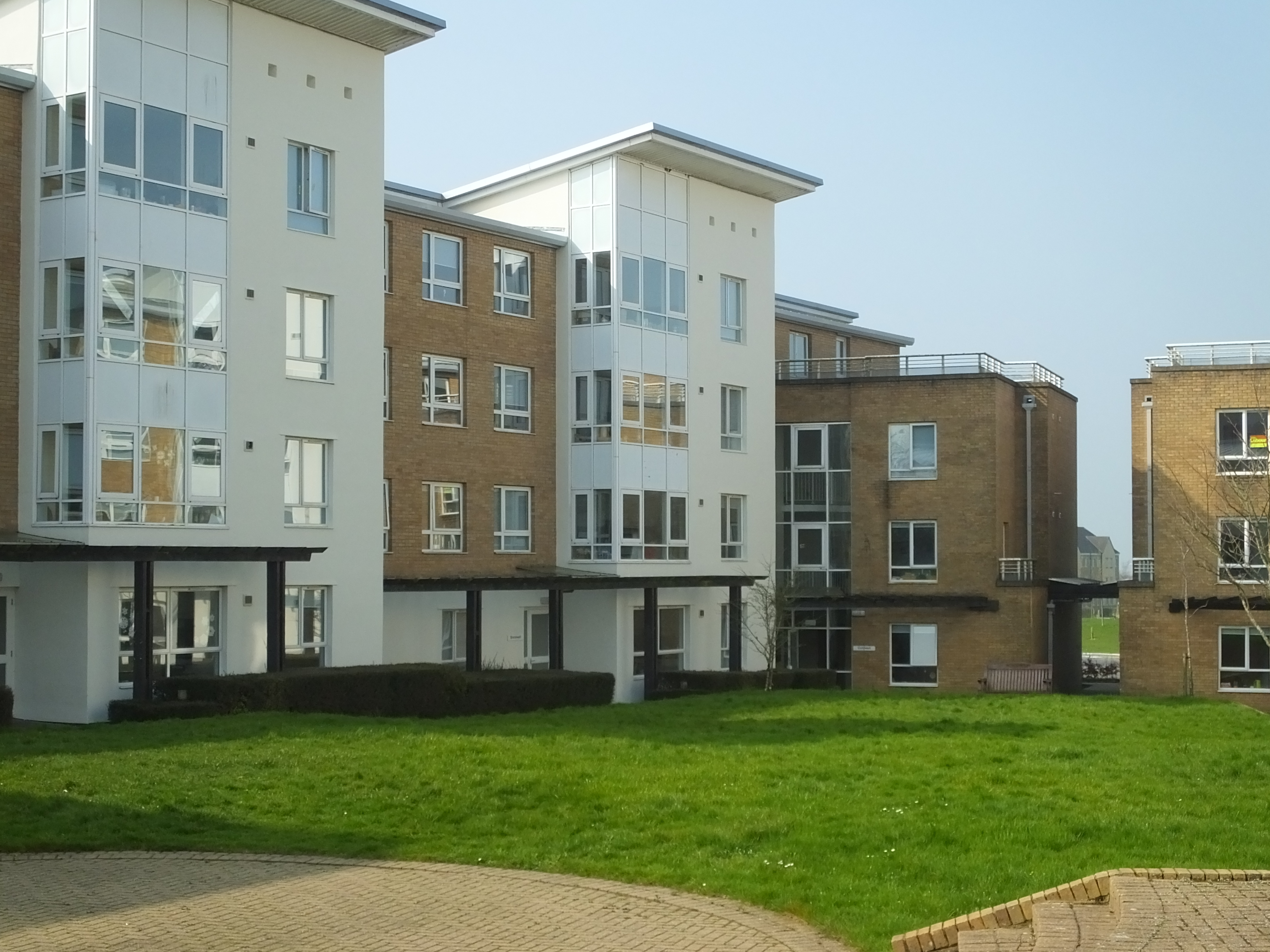
Pendle College, Lancaster, established in 1974

Lancaster University is defined by its royal charter to be a collegiate university. It has nine colleges, eight of which are for undergraduate students and one – Graduate College – which is for postgraduate students. The undergraduate colleges consist of: Bowland; Cartmel; County; Furness; Fylde; Grizedale; Lonsdale and Pendle, all of which have their own bars with different themes. The undergraduate colleges were founded between 1964 (when the university was established) and 1974, with Graduate College being added in 1992.

All students and staff at Lancaster are college members. Colleges are independent of university education, instead providing on-campus accommodation, social events and sporting teams. Undergraduate students must choose from one of the eight undergraduate colleges; on-campus accommodation is usually a key factor in this choice. Postgraduate students are always assigned to Graduate College, whereas staff members may choose any college. Students must pay a college membership fee. There is a programme of inter-college sports, with the winner being awarded the Carter Shield.

==== University of York ====
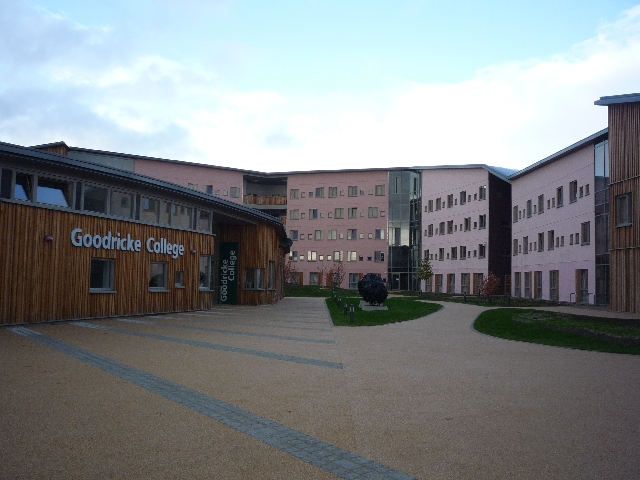
Goodricke College, one of the 21st century colleges on the Heslington East campus

There are eleven colleges at the University of York, with the most recent founded in 2022, and all students are members of a college. One college, Wentworth Graduate College, is postgraduate only. Each college is governed by its own college council, which contains a combination of university staff and elected student members and is chaired by a senior college fellow (the role of college principal having been abolished in 2023), and is managed by a college manager. Most colleges have a Junior Common Room for undergraduate students, which is managed by the elected Junior Common Room Committee. Some colleges retain a Graduate Common Room for postgraduate students, as well as a Senior Common Room, which is managed by elected representatives of the college's academic and administrative members. Other colleges however combine undergraduate and postgraduate representation together into student associations.

Intercollegiate sport is one of the main activities of the colleges. Currently there are 21 leagues with weekly fixtures, in addition a number of one day events are organised as well. In 2014 the "College Varsity" tournament was created, with sporting competitions held between York's colleges and the colleges of Durham University. York hosted the first tournament which was won by Durham's colleges; the second tournament was hosted by Durham in 2015, who won again. The third tournament was held in York in 2016, with York winning for the first time, and the fourth in Durham in 2017, with the hosts reclaiming the title.

==== University of Roehampton ====
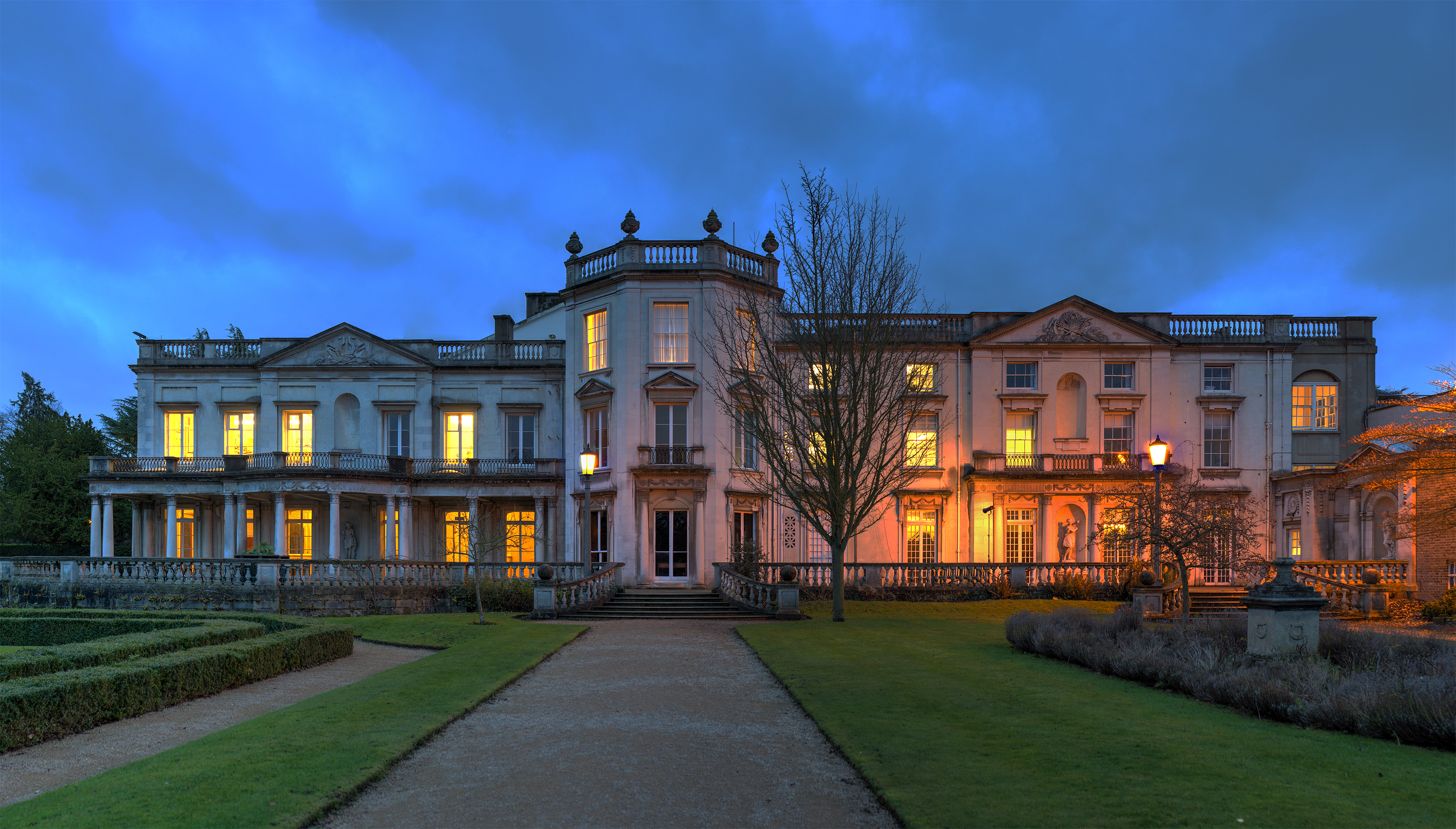
Grove House, part of Froebel College at the University of Roehampton

The University of Roehampton has its roots in the traditions of its four constituent colleges – Digby Stuart, Froebel, Southlands and Whitelands – which were all formed in the 19th century. Each college has a "providing body", an independent charity that owns the freehold or leasehold interest of the college's property. The university holds long-term leases and management agreements with the providing bodies for three of the colleges, and a rolling seven-year licensed and management agreement for Whitelands. While the colleges were all originally independent, they have now merged into the university, with the last college (Whitelands) merging in 2012.

Each college has an elected president and vice-president. These, along with the university-wide sabbatical president and two sabbatical vice-presidents, make up the elected officers of Roehampton Students' Union.

=== Former collegiate universities ===
==== University of Kent ====
All students at the University of Kent were part of one of eight colleges. Each college had a master, who was responsible for enforcing University regulations and ensuring safe student conduct. Each college also had an elected student committee. There were seven colleges (Eliot, Rutherford, Keynes, Darwin, Turing, Park Wood, and Woolf) on the Canterbury campus, with Woolf being "mainly postgraduate", and Medway College on the Medway campus. The initial four colleges (Elliot, Rutherford, Keynes and Darwin) were established between 1965 and 1970, after which no new college was established at the Canterbury campus until Woolf in 2008. This was followed by Turing (2014) and Park Wood (2020). The university abolished the position of college master in 2020. Following this, a revision of the university's ordinances in June 2025 deleted the section on colleges that had been present up to the 2024 revision, removing then from the university's constitutional documents. As of 2025, only three of the university's residences still bear the names of colleges.

==== University of St Andrews ====
The first college at St Andrews was St John's College, established in 1418. This was followed by St Salvator's College in 1450 and St Leonard's College in 1512. St John's was refounded as St Mary's College in 1537. Following the Scottish Reformation, all teaching was transferred to the colleges, with St Mary's concentrating on divinity (theology) while the other two concentrated on philosophy (arts). The decline of the university in the 18th century saw St Salvator's and St Leonard's merge to form the United College. Residence declined in the latter part of the 18th century, and was discouraged by the university leadership. The common table in the colleges was finally abandoned at St Mary's in 1814 and in the United College in 1820, which is seen as marking the end of the collegiate residential system. When residential living was re-established at the university, in 1896 for women and in 1930 for men, it was on a non-collegiate basis.

The university now comprises three colleges: United College, St Mary's College and St Leonard's College. The purpose of the colleges is mainly ceremonial, as students are housed in separate residential halls or private accommodations. United College is responsible for all students in the faculties of arts, sciences, and medicine, and is based around St Salvator's Quadrangle. St Mary's College is responsible for all students studying in the Faculty of Divinity, and has its own dedicated site in St Mary's Quadrangle. St Leonard's College is now responsible for all postgraduate students. In 2022 the university announced its intention to create New College, a fourth college responsible for the school of International Relations and the newly formed Business School, which comprises the departments of Economics, Finance and Management. It will be located at the former site of Madras College in the town's centre, and is expected to cost £100 million.

== Teaching colleges ==
Some universities have colleges that are primarily teaching institutions, although they may also provide accommodation. Such universities are commonly known as federal universities.

=== Development ===
The first form of federal university to appear in Britain was the examining and degree-awarding body. As originally established in 1836, the University of London was of this type. Under its charter, it could award degrees to students from affiliated colleges, but these colleges were not part of the university and had no say in its running. The university was managed by a senate appointed by the government, which defined the curriculum the colleges had to teach for their degree courses. The first two colleges, named in the original charter, were University College London (UCL) and King's College London. The next to be added, a year later, was Durham, a full university that was already awarding degrees in its own name. Durham refused to accept this external control, and its name was removed in 1839. Despite this early setback, the list of affiliated colleges grew to include everything from grammar schools to the universities of the British Empire by 1858, when the affiliated college system was abandoned and London's degree examinations were thrown open to anyone.

There was also an attempt to form a federal "National University for Scotland", with the commissioners under the Universities (Scotland) Act 1858 being given the power to inquire into whether this world be "practicable and expedient". Under this scheme, the four ancient universities of Scotland would have become colleges of the new National University. This proved no more popular with the Scottish universities than being subordinated to London had with Durham: the commissioners concluded that the project was neither practicable nor expedient, noting that they "did not receive any reply favourable to the formation of a National University" from the universities.

By this time another federal university, the Queen's University of Ireland, had been established in 1850. This was the first true federal university in the UK, with the three Queen's colleges (Belfast, Cork and Galway) established in 1845 becoming its member colleges. However, the new university and its colleges were barred from teaching theology and were thus condemned as "detrimental to religion" by the Pope. The Irish University Bill 1873 attempted to replace it by transforming the University of Dublin into a federal university taking in Trinity College Dublin and the Queen's colleges in Belfast and Cork (with the Galway college being dissolved). This was opposed by both the Catholic bishops of Ireland and by Trinity College, and failed by three votes at its second reading, leading the Gladstone ministry to resign. In 1880, the Queen's University was replaced by the Royal University of Ireland, an examining and degree-awarding body modelled after the University of London (as it then existed) that, like London, awarded degrees to anyone who passed its exams.

Following a campaign led by UCL and King's in the late 19th century, the University of London became a federal body in 1900. Later the expansion of the university saw the growth of the small specialist colleges such as the Royal Academy of Music and Institute of Education, University of London (now part of UCL) either by being established within or merging into the university.

The constitution of the University of London evolved during the 20th century, with power shifting towards the central University and then back towards the colleges. In the mid-1990s the colleges gained direct access to government funding and the right to confer University of London degrees themselves, and from 2008 those colleges that held their own degree awarding powers were allowed to use them while remaining part of the federation. The University of London Act 2018 allowed member institutions to become universities in their own right while remaining part of the federation.

=== Fully federal universities ===
==== University of London ====
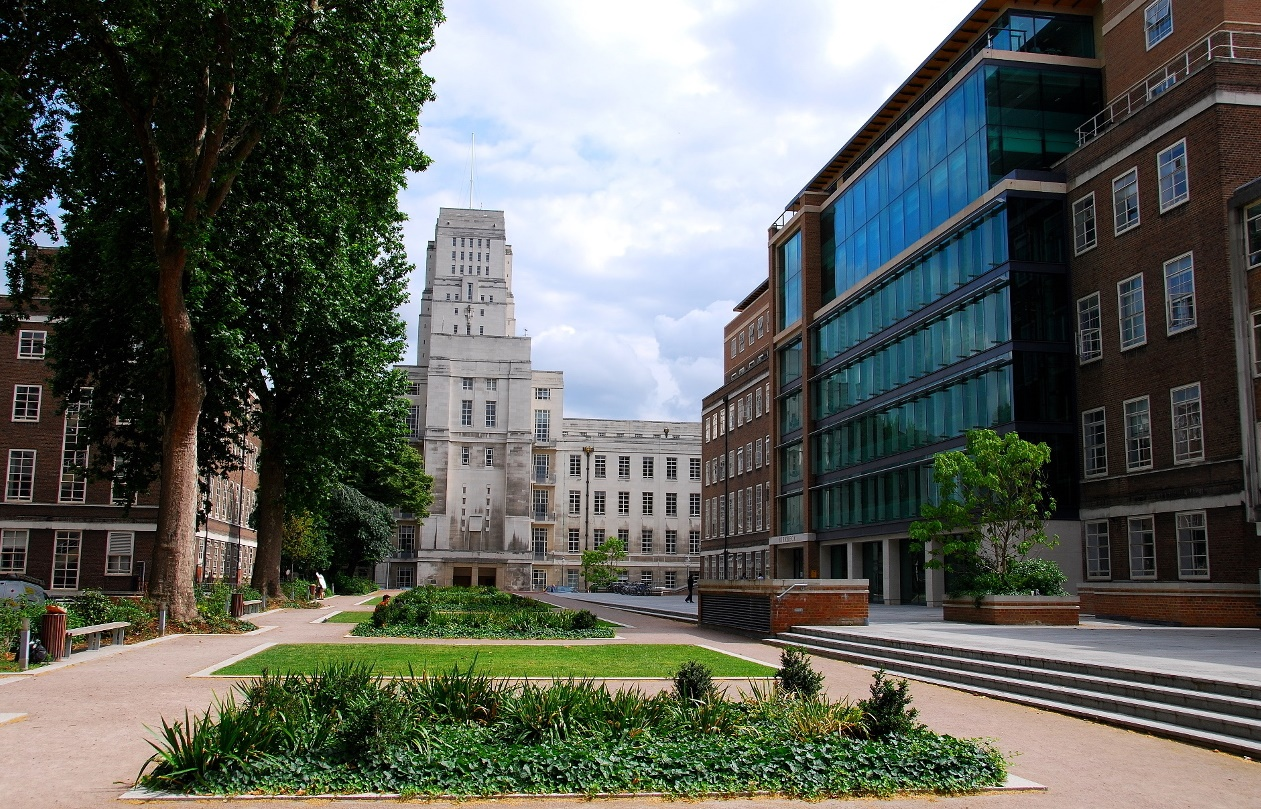
Birkbeck, University of London, adjacent to the Senate House, the administrative centre of the University of London

The University of London is a federal university comprising 17 member institutions. Following the passing of the University of London Act 2018, constituent colleges can apply to become universities in their own right while remaining members of the federal university; 12 of the colleges applied for university status in 2019. By mid-2024, 11 of those member institutions (two subsequently merged) had been awarded university title with the 12th expected to gain that status during 2024–25, and another university had joined.

The university's December 2018 statutes, made under the 2018 act, allowed for member institutions to have either "the status of a college" (1.3.8(a)) or "the status of a university" (1.3.8(b)). In its April 2024 statutes this was revised to having "legal status either as a university or another form of educational, academic or research institution", with no mention of colleges specifically and without subdividing the member institutions into two classes, although the university's ordinances from July 2024 do still divide member institutions into those having "legal status as an educational, academic or research institution but not as a university" (5.A.1.1(a)) and those with "the status of a university" (5.A.1.1(b)).

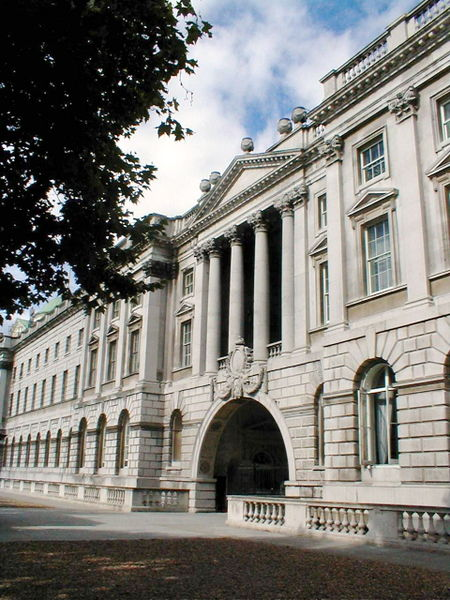
King's College London, established by royal charter in 1829, was one of the original affiliated colleges of the University of London

The University of London also has three central academic bodies: the School of Advanced Study, the University of London Institute in Paris (ULIP), and the University of London Worldwide, which are under the direct control of the central university and are not considered member institutions. The School of Advanced Study and ULIP are both listed bodies as institutions of a university (as was the University Marine Biological Station Millport).

==== University of the Arts London ====
The University of the Arts London (UAL) comprises six specialist art and design colleges, dating from the 1850s to the 1960s, that were brought together for administrative purposes. The colleges are not listed bodies and do not have separate legal identities, but maintain their separate identity and teach their own courses within the university.

==== University of the Highlands and Islands ====
The University of the Highlands and Islands (UHI) is a federal collegiate university consisting of 13 independent "academic partner" colleges and a central executive office. Like the colleges of Oxford, Cambridge and Durham, and those of London prior to the mid-1990s, UHI colleges are Listed Bodies.

=== Universities with associated colleges ===
A few universities, while operating as unitary institutions, have associated colleges in federal relationships.

==== Queen's University Belfast ====
Queen's University Belfast has a federal relationship with two associated university colleges, Stranmillis University College and St Mary's University College. These are listed bodies under part two of the listed bodies order, the same status as colleges of Oxford, Cambridge, Durham and the University of the Highlands and Islands.

==== University of South Wales ====
The University of South Wales owns as subsidiary companies the Royal Welsh College of Music and Drama and Merthyr Tydfil College (a further and higher education college). Like the university colleges associated with Queen's University Belfast, these are listed bodies under part two of the listed bodies order.

==== University of Wales Trinity St Davids ====
The University of Wales Trinity St David (UWTSD) owns Coleg Sir Gâr, a further and higher education college, which has Coleg Ceredigion, another further and higher education college, as a subsidiary. Like the university colleges associated with Queen's University Belfast, these are listed bodies under part two of the listed bodies order.

=== Former federal universities ===
==== University of Durham ====
The University of Durham has had, in addition to the extant collegiate system described in § Durham University above, both forms of federal system at various points during its existence. In the 19th century it had two associated colleges in Newcastle upon Tyne: the Durham University College of Medicine (and it its predecessor institutions) from 1852; and Armstrong College (and its predecessor institutions) from 1871. This arrangement lasted until 1909, when Durham was converted into a fully federal university. This consisted of a Durham division, incorporated as the Durham Colleges, and a Newcastle division, consisting of the College of Medicine and Armstrong College until they merged in 1937 to form King's College. The federation was dissolved in 1963 when King's College became the independent University of Newcastle upon Tyne.

==== Victoria University of Manchester ====
The Victoria University of Manchester affiliated the University of Manchester Institute of Science and Technology (UMIST) from 1905 to 1994) and the Manchester Business School (set up jointly with UMIST in 1965) until the merger of UMIST and the Victoria University of Manchester in 2004, forming the current University of Manchester. These were both listed bodies as institutions of a university under the listed bodies order.

==== Queen's University of Ireland ====
The Queen's University of Ireland was a federal university from 1850 to 1880, taking in Queen's College Belfast, Queen's College Cork and Queen's College Galway. The university was replaced by the Royal University of Ireland, an examining and degree-awarding body without member institutions, in 1880. This was in turn replaced by Queen's University Belfast and the National University of Ireland in 1908.

==== University of Surrey ====
The University of Surrey validated the degree courses at St Mary's College, Twickenham, from 1983. The college was formally affiliated to the university from 1990, and in 1992 became a college of the University of Surrey. It held this status until it gained its own taught degree awarding powers and became St Mary's University College in 2006.

Surrey also validated the degree courses of the Roehampton Institute from 1983. In 1993 Roehampton gained its own taught degree awarding powers but chose to continue awarding Surrey degrees and, in 1995, became an institute of the University of Surrey. It gained its own research degree awarding powers in 1998 and signed a deed of federation with the university in 1999, establishing the Federal University of Surrey from the start of 2000, with the name of the institute being changed to the University of Surrey Roehampton. The federation was dissolved in 2004 when Roehampton became the independent Roehampton University.

==== Victoria University ====
The Victoria University was a federal university that existed from 1880 to 1904, with colleges in Manchester (1880–1904), Liverpool (1884–1903) and Leeds (1887–1904). The federation was dissolved when its Corea became independent universities, with the university merging with its original college in Manchester to form the Victoria University of Manchester.

==== University of Wales ====
In the University of Wales, colleges were the lower tier of institutional membership in the federal structure, below constituent institutions, following the reorganisation of the university in 1996. Prior to this, the member institutions were all called colleges. After 2007 the colleges and constituent institutions all became independent universities, with the University of Wales shifting to a confederal structure where it validated degrees from these and other institutions. This arrangement ended in 2011 and it was announced that the university would merge with the University of Wales Trinity Saint David. From August 2017 the two institutions have been functionality merged.

== See also ==
- University college § United Kingdom
- List of residential colleges § United Kingdom
- House system
- Residential college
- Common room (university) § Collegiate universities
- Head of college
