= Rainer Hersch =

British conductor

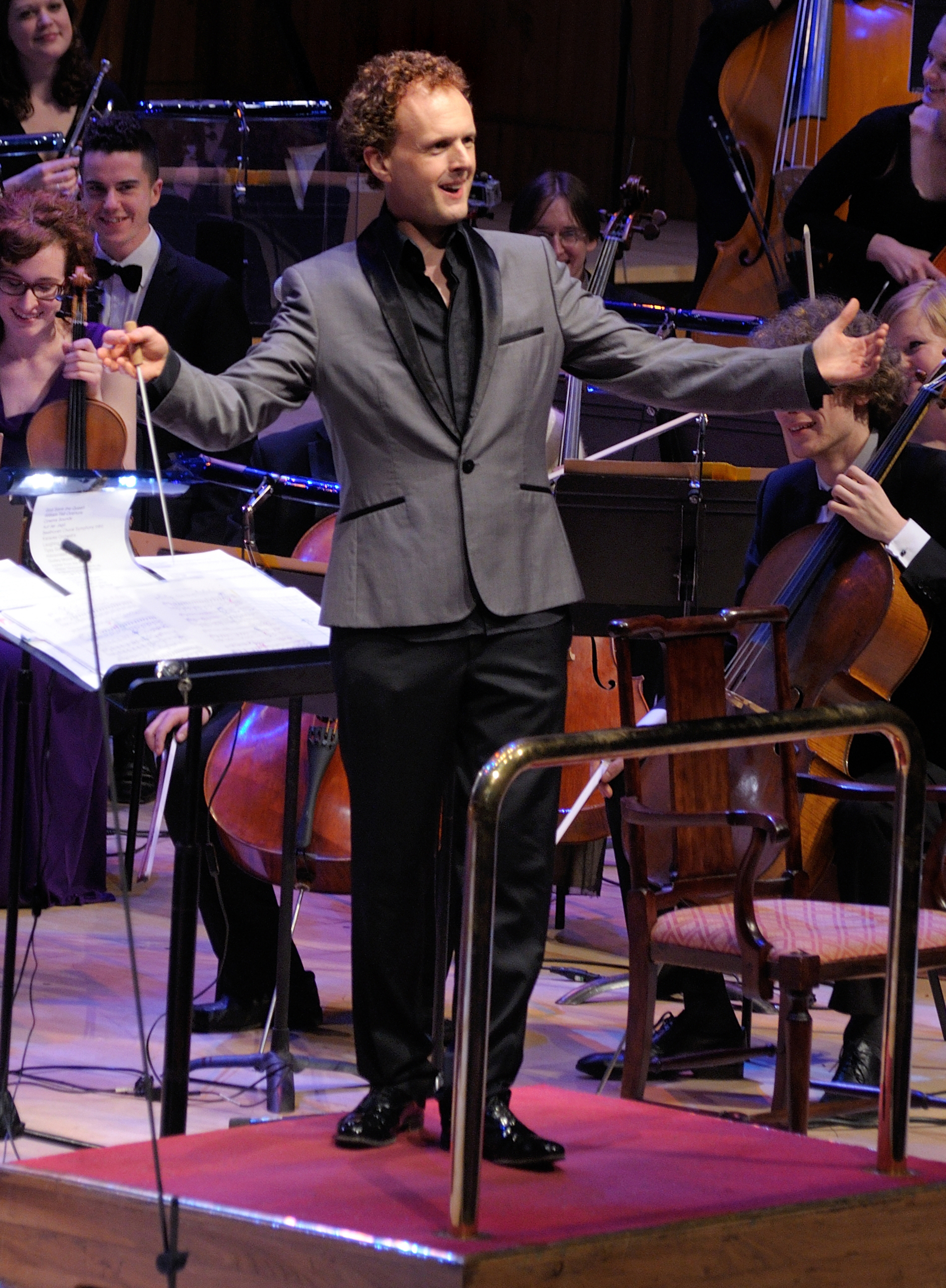
- Hersch at Festival Hall, London in 2013
- Born: 7 November 1962 (age 63); Thames Ditton, Surrey, UK
- Education: Lancaster University
- Notable work: All Classical Music Explained; All The Right Notes... April Fools Comedy Concerts

Comedy career
- Years active: 1987–present
- Medium: Stand-up, Concert Hall, television, Radio
- Genre: Musical comedy
- Website: rainerhersch.com

Rainer Hersch (born 7 November 1962) is a British conductor and comedian known for his comical take on classical music. He has toured in more than 30 countries and has broadcast extensively, principally for the BBC. His radio series include All Classical Music Explained (BBC Radio 4, 1997); Rainer Hersch's 20th Century Retrospective (BBC Radio 3, 1999) and All the Right Notes, Not Necessarily in the Right Order (BBC Radio 4, 2003 and 2006).

== Early life ==
Hersch read Economics at Lancaster University, where his fellow students included Andy Serkis and James May. A Monty Python fan in his youth, he joined the Revue Group, the university's student comedy troupe, and began his writing career. He was a member of Cartmel College and served as JCR president – a position usually held by final year students – during his first term. In July 2015 he was presented with an Alumni Award by Lancaster University for graduates who have made a substantial contribution to their field and developed an outstanding international reputation.

== Career ==
=== Comedian ===
In December 1987 Hersch made his debut on the London stand-up circuit as part of a comic double act The Tebbits with fellow student Peter Wylie. In 1992 he gave up his job as Touring Manager of the London Festival Orchestra to become a professional comedian and since that time has performed exclusively as a solo artist. In 1996 Rainer wrote and presented his stand-up show All Classical Music Explained (ACME) at Edinburgh Festival Fringe, one of thirteen such Edinburgh appearances. Billed as "a simple and stupid guide to questions like 'why is organ music so boring?'; 'what does a conductor actually do?' and 'how to clap in the wrong place and mean it'" ACME has since been performed over 300 times in four continents. It established him as an original comic voice and the classical music theme, which has dominated all his subsequent activities.

Hersch continues to tour the world presenting his one-man shows or as guest conductor in comedy concerts with orchestra. Among his many other commitments he is currently conductor/host of the annual Johann Strauss Gala – an extensive, UK-wide tour promoted by Raymond Gubbay Ltd and Artistic Director of the April Fools Day Concert at the Royal Festival Hall, an event he instigated in 2009.

=== Musician ===
Hersch studied piano as a private pupil of Norma Fisher. He studied conducting for three years at The Conservatoire in London with Denise Ham and in masterclasses at the Royal Academy of Music with János Fürst and George Hurst. He has conducted many orchestras around the world, including The Philharmonia Orchestra, City of Birmingham Symphony Orchestra, Queensland Symphony Orchestra, Tasmanian Symphony Orchestra and Saint Petersburg Philharmonic Orchestra. Soloists who have participated in his comedy concerts include Alfred Brendel, Nicola Benedetti, Marc-André Hamelin, Paul Lewis and Dame Evelyn Glennie.

=== Personal life ===
Rainer Hersch is the grandson of the artist Eugen Hersch and the great-great-great grandson of the playwright Hermann Hersch. Born in the UK of a German father and English mother, Hersch is fluent in both languages. He also speaks Spanish and French.

He lives in London with his wife, Cornelia Rosa (Connie) Hersch (née Dussinger), a marketing executive and politician who has been a Liberal Democrat councillor on Ealing Borough Council for Ealing Common ward since 2022.

== Credits ==
=== Radio credits ===
Include: Front Row (BBC Radio 4); The Today Programme (BBC Radio 4); Counterpoint (BBC Radio 4); Quote...Unquote (BBC Radio 4); Broadcasting House (BBC Radio 4); Excess Baggage (BBC Radio 4); Loose Ends (BBC Radio 4, 1996–2003); The Right Note (BBC Radio 4); I'm Glad You Asked Me That (BBC Radio 4); Private Passions (BBC Radio 3); In Tune (BBC Radio 3); Jammin' (BBC Radio 2); Definitely Not the Opera (Canadian Broadcasting Corporation, Comedy Hour). All The Right Notes, Not Necessarily In The Right Order (BBC Radio 4, Series 1: September 2002; Series 2: January 2006). Rainer Hersch's Club Mozart (Classic FM, December 2001; April 2002; August 2002). Quando, Quando, Quando (BBC Radio 4, November 1999). Rainer Hersch's 20th Century Retrospective (BBC Radio 3, December 1998). Rainer Hersch's All Classical Music Explained (BBC Radio 4, October 1998).

=== TV credits ===
Include: See Hear (BBC 2); The World Stands Up (Paramount Comedy Channel); Carlton Stand-Up for the Homeless (ITV); The Big Stage (Channel 5); Team Captain with The Entertainment Game (BBC1 – 23 shows); How Do They Do That (ITV); Selina Scott (BskyB); The Big Breakfast (Channel 4); Quatsch (Pro Sieben – Germany).

=== Recordings ===
- All Classical Music Explained ASIN: B00066KX9G
- The 2013 April Fools Day Concert DVD

=== Live shows ===
- 2015: Christmas No.1 Singalong
- 2014: The 2014 April Fools Day Concert (Orchestra)
- 2013: The 2013 April Fools Day Concert (Orchestra)
- 2012: The 2012 April Fools Day Concert (Orchestra)
- 2011: Mozart: Ze Komplete Hystery (one-man show)
- 2009: Classic Relief at the Royal Festival Hall (Orchestra)
- 2009: Last Night of the Proms... Ever! (Orchestra)
- 2007: At Last! The 1977 New Year's Day Concert (Orchestra)
- 2006: Mozart’s Back! (three-man show)
- 2005: Organtastic! (two-man show)
- 2004: Rainer Hersch's Victor Borge (formerly 'Borge Again!') (one-man show)
- 2003: Rainer Hersch's Instruments of Mass Destruction (one-man show)
- 2002: Rainer Hersch Will Sell Out (one-man show)
- 2001: Club Mozart (one-man show)
- 2000: Rainer Hersch @ Music dot Comedy (one-man show)
- 1997: All Classical Music Explained: The Masterclass (one-man show)
- 1996: All Classical Music Explained (one-man show)
- 1995: Was God British? (one-man show)
- 1994: The Mass Bands of the Grenadier Guards and R.A.F. Flypast + Support (one-man show)
