= Bowland College, Lancaster =

Constituent college of Lancaster University

Coordinates: 54.011°N 2.785°W

Bowland College
- University of Lancaster
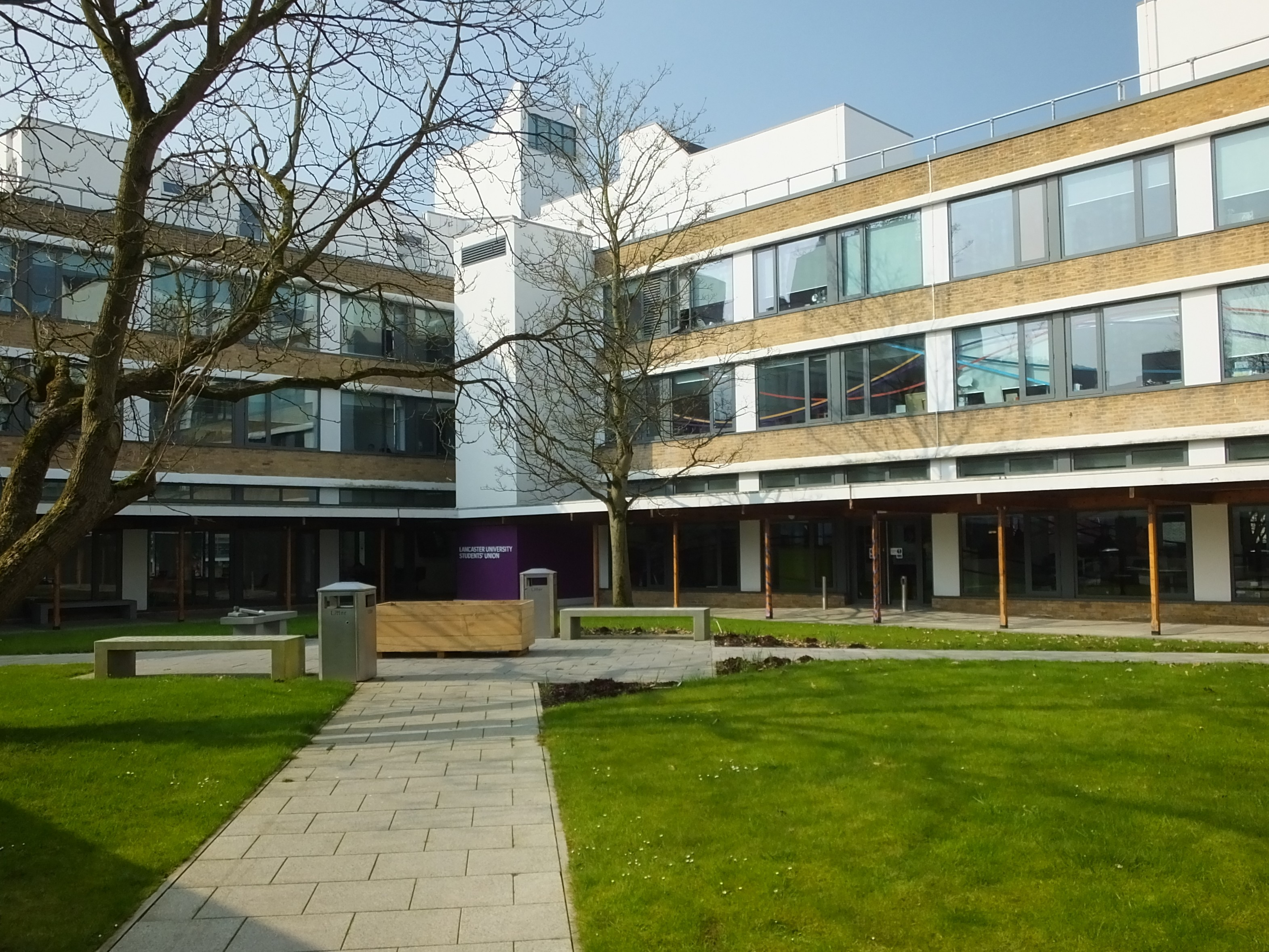
- Bowland Main quad
- Motto: Bowland 'Til I Die
- Established: 1964
- Named for: The Forest of Bowland
- Colours: Red
- Principal: Casey Cross
- JCR President: Sonny Remmer-Riley
- Dean: Ben Mayfield
- Undergraduates: 1677
- Website: Bowland College

Bowland College is the oldest and fourth largest constituent college of Lancaster University. The college was named after the Forest of Bowland, to the east of Lancaster. Members of the college are informally referred to as Bowlanders.

== History ==
Bowland was founded alongside Lonsdale College as the first two colleges of the university in 1964. The Bowland and Lonsdale buildings were built as mirror images of each other, but Lonsdale's building was not completed until a year after Bowland's, making Bowland the oldest college on campus. After Lonsdale's move to south-west campus in 2004, the original Lonsdale building was taken over by Bowland and is today known as "Bowland North".

Since 2004 the two colleges have competed in the annual Founders Series, consisting of nineteen sports contested over four days.

== Symbols ==
The current logo, adopted in 2023, is a red circle containing a bow and arrow, resembling both a capital B and a bird. The bird represents the Forest of Bowland, and the bow and arrow retains the link to the previous logo, the Bowland Lady.

The Bowland Lady represents the personification of Bowland Forest, and is from a Lancashire map drawn by William Hole for the 1622 edition of a poem "Poly-Olbion, or a Chorographical Description of ... The Renowned Isle of Great Britain", the lifetime's work of Michael Drayton, a friend of Shakespeare. The poem is in the University Library. The college magazine is also named after "The Bowland Lady". The Forest of Bowland was originally called "Bolland" and this pronunciation remains common amongst local people living in the forest.

The JCR motto is 'Bowland Til I Die'.

== College Buildings ==
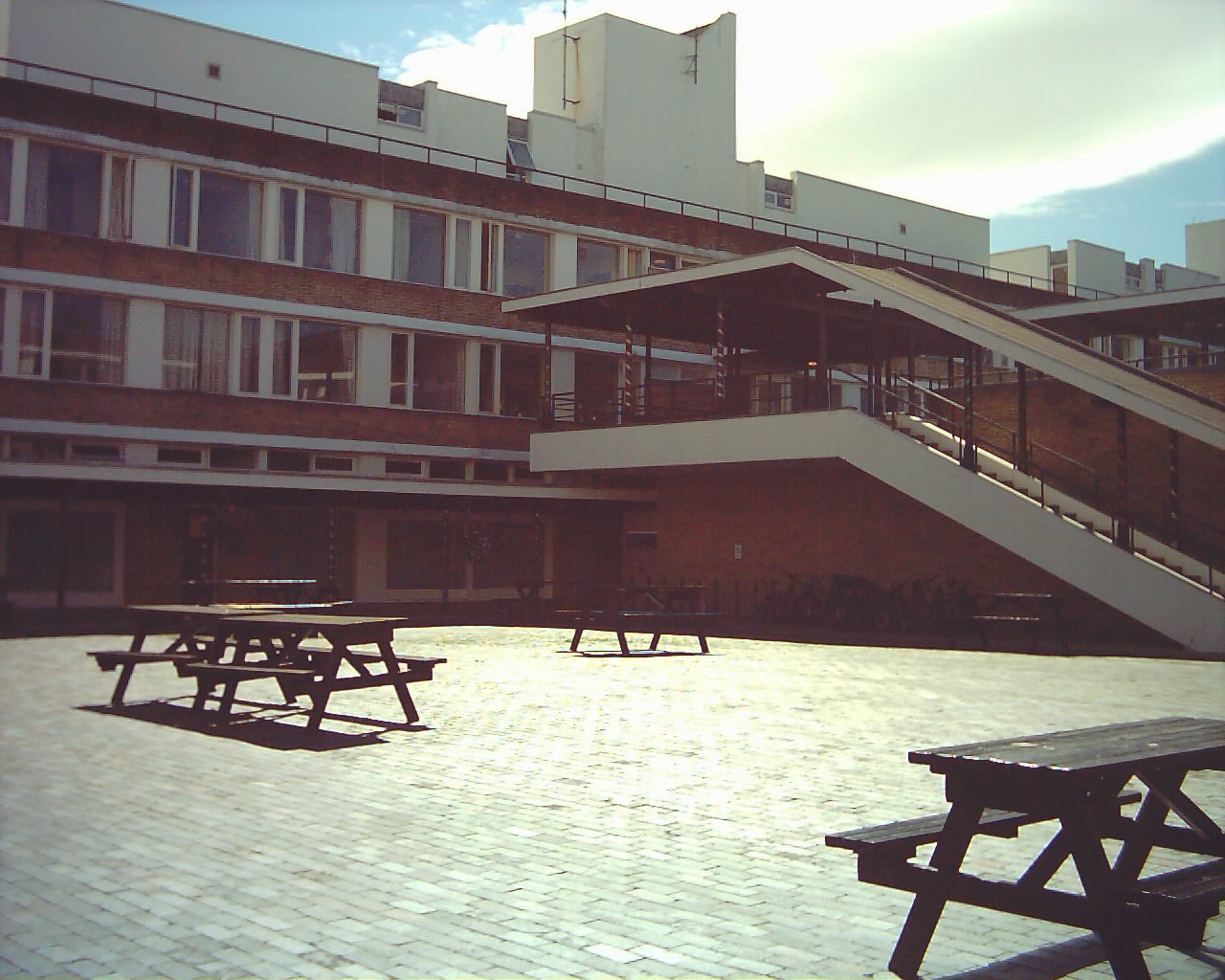
Bowland College Quad

The college has approximately 650 study bedrooms overall, providing both en-suite and shared bathroom facilities. The standard residences in 'Bowland Main' and 'Bowland North', along the North Spine, provide sociable kitchen spaces shared between 16 and 26 people, and are situated around the college's main quadrangles. In contrast, Bowland Hall offers en-suite residences in a tranquil location by the tree-lined perimeter road; with 4-6 students sharing each flat.

Until 1995, the college occupied its main building, 'Bowland Tower', and 'Bowland Annexe'. In 1995 'Slaidburn House' was completed, providing extra accommodation for the college to the south of Alexandra Square.

In 2004, the college renamed its main building to 'Bowland Main' and took over the space to its immediate north, which had been vacated by Lonsdale College. This was renamed 'Bowland North'. In the same year, the college gained the upper floors of Assistant Staff House and Graduate Hall, with the latter being renamed 'Bowland Halls'.

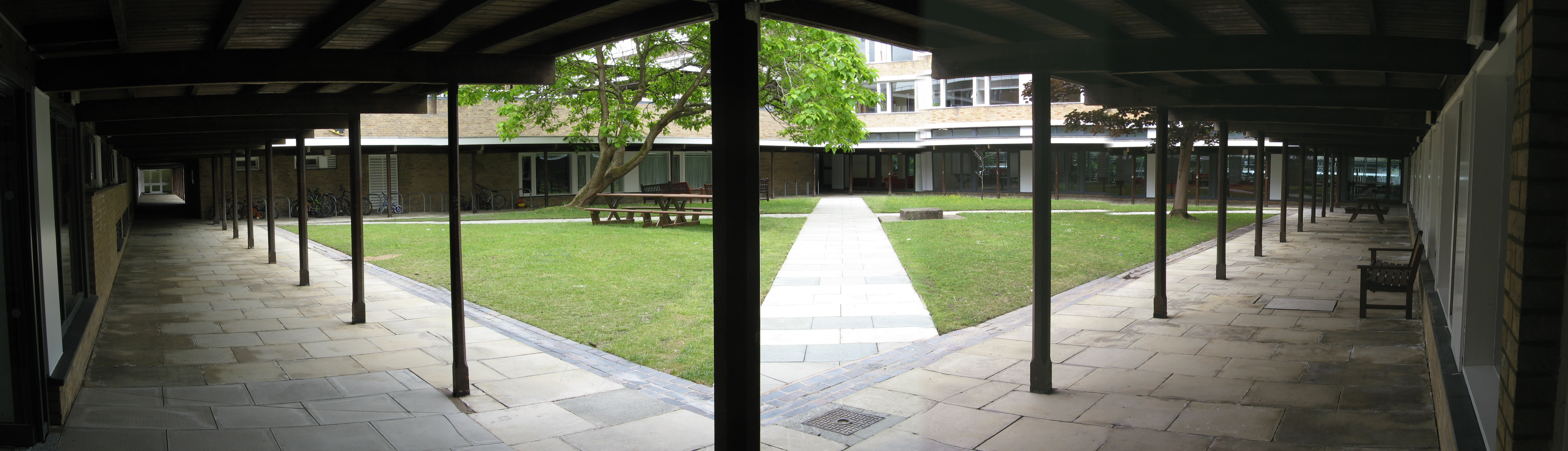
Bowland Main Quad

Bowland Annexe was later renamed Bowland Tower East and Bowland Tower North. The college also acquired the Art Department building, which subsequently took on the name 'Bowland Annexe'. Bowland Annexe is no longer in use as an accommodation block.

As of 2025, Bowland College occupies the following halls of residences:

- Bowland Main, Bowland South and Bowland East
- Ash House
- Bowland Halls
- Slaidburn House
- Bowland Tower

As well as providing accommodation, Bowland College also has its own study space and kitchen for off-campus students, located next to its Porter's Office. The college also has a student common room, located in Bowland Quad, providing an additional study and social space. The common room space is frequently used for inter-college bar sports competitions, as well as for organised events by student societies and the college's Junior and Senior Common Rooms.

Until 2025, Bowland College also had its own bar, the 'Trough of Bowland', connected to its common room space. In January 2025, it was announced that, alongside Lonsdale College's 'The Red Lion', the bar would no longer be used as a bar space. The JCR President, Sonny Remmer-Riley, told the Lancaster Tab that the JCR was "not involved in the decision", and that the decision was taken by the university without consultation with students.

Following a feedback survey posted on Instagram in 2025, the bar space was renovated into a study zone where students can sustain themselves on free tea and coffee.

== Governance ==
=== JCR Executive ===
The Junior Common Room Executive, a standing committee of the Students' Union, consists of up to 15 students and is elected by the undergraduate population of the college in Michaelmas Term. The JCR Exec exists to represent students' views, organise socials and campaigns and provide opportunities for students to get involved in events and activities taking place in the college.

Bowland is unique as members of the Executive are officially titled "representatives" rather than "officers" (though the two are commonly used interchangeably).

=== JCR Presidents ===
The Junior Common Room (JCR) is the undergraduate student body of Bowland College, led by an elected President. The following is a list of JCR Presidents since the college's founding in 1964.

Year	JCR President	Year	JCR President	Year	JCR President
2026	Sonny Remmer-Riley	2005	Blair Chalmers / Ross O'Connor	1984	Stephen Denton
2025	Sonny Remmer-Riley	2004	Jacob Samuels	1983	Nicholas Dryer
2024	Sonny Remmer-Riley	2003	Phil Steggals	1982	Liz Hodgen
2024	Kinga Kupi	2002	Lucy Hope-Smith	1981	Unknown
2023	Kinga Kupi	2001	Evan Roberts	1980	Unknown
2022	Emilija Katelynaite	2000	Andrew Murphy	1979	Lesley Burr
2022	Krista Shaw	1999	Alex Wiffin	1978	Barry Hoyle
2021	Michael Oldfield	1998	Paul Reynolds	1977	Unknown
2021	Samuel Payne	1997	Ellie Sadler	1976	Mark Lane
2020	Miriam Bonney	1996	Nicholas Nealson	1975	Peter Elliott
2019	Charles Bradbury	1995	Unknown	1974	Nicholas Morgan / Gerald Hayes
2018	Oliver Self / George O'Brien	1994	Ben Carroll	1973	Rob Wilson
2017	Domenica Giorgianni	1993	Unknown	1972	Richard Harris
2016	Steven Pugh	1992	Unknown	1971	Dave Cromwell
2015	Julia Sammons	1991	Unknown	1970	Stewart Binns / Tim Hamlett
2014	Lee Dudding	1990	Unknown	1969	Bryan Fox / Frank Fuller
2013	Patrick Somervell	1989	Unknown	1968	Steve Westacott
2012	Daniel-Sean Huisman	1988	Unknown	1967	Ray Walker
2011	Anastasia Rattigan	1987	Unknown	1966	Paul Stafford
2010	Kath Embling	1986	Jo Hardman	1965	Carole Barker
2009	Tom Skarbek-Wazynski	1985	Unknown	1964	Paul Bucci
2008	Berni Denton				
2007	Janie Coleman				
2006	Tom Halstead				

=== Syndicate ===
The University Statutes require the College Syndicate to be formally responsible for the strategic governance of the college. The Syndicate is chaired by the College Principal. Membership comprises all senior members of the college plus the current JCR Executive Officers. An additional 10 junior members may be appointed at the discretion of the Syndicate.

Meeting at least once a year, the Syndicate has overall responsibility for the strategic development and governance of the college, including the welfare of the student members and disciplinary matters. It may also discuss general matters relating to Colleges and the university as they arise, and report College views to University Senate, the governing academic body of the university.

=== College Management Committee ===
In practice, most decisions relating to the day-to-day running of the college are discussed and determined at Management Committee meetings. The Management Committee reports to the Syndicate. Membership consists of several senior officers, plus the JCR President and vice-presidents.

== Sport ==
Bowland College regularly competes in weekly inter-collegiate sports against the other eight colleges of Lancaster University. This comes in the form of their four men's football teams, four lady's netball teams and various bar sports including table tennis, pool, and darts.

Bowland College won the inter-college trophy, the Carter Shield, in 2006, 2007, 2008 and more recently in 2016. It is also the overall winner of the Founders Trophy, an annual competition between Bowland and Lonsdale, the two founding colleges of Lancaster University. The competition usually takes place during the final term of the academic year, over a four-day period. The two colleges compete in various sports including conventional college sports and also sports not usually competed by colleges such as, hockey, basketball, cricket, etc. Bowland has dominated the Founders Trophy since its conception; however, in recent years Lonsdale have found more success in the competition, closing the gap in terms of overall victories.

Bowland College has continued to be a main competitor in the Carter Shield and George Wyatt Trophy, in inter-collegiate sports.

Each year, Bowland College takes part in an Intercollegiate quiz along with the other nine colleges at Lancaster University, inspired by University Challenge. In 2018, Bowland College made it through to the final, along with Cartmel College and subsequently won, scoring 245–145.

== Notable alumni ==
- Damian Barr, journalist and writer
- Antony Burgmans, former Chairman of Unilever (until 2007)
- Brian Clegg, author of popular science books
- Daniel Ings, actor
- Mark Price, managing director of Waitrose
- Jason Queally MBE, cyclist
- Bruce Sewell, former Senior Vice President and General Counsel, Apple
