= Ordinance (university) =

In United Kingdom universities, ordinances, sometimes termed regulations, are detailed legislation that translates the broad principles of the university's charter and statutes.

Most UK universities created before 1992 are established by royal charter. Under their charters, they are empowered to make statutes, but any changes to these require the approval of the Privy Council. However, the charter and statutes empower the university to create and modify ordinances. These constitute more detailed legislation that translates the broad principles enshrined in charter and statutes into practical effect. Typically any change to ordinances will require the agreement of the governing body of the university. Ordinances frequently require or allow the promulgation of regulations which can be approved by lesser bodies.

Because of their different history, universities created since 1992 (the so-called "new universities") have a different scheme of governance, and a different vocabulary to accompany it.

Some university systems influenced by the UK model, particularly in the Commonwealth, use the word ordinance in the same way.
