= Bruce Sewell =

Apple Inc. executive

- Born: Durward Bruce Sewell; 1957/58
- Occupation: Lawyer
- Predecessor: Daniel Cooperman
- Successor: Katherine L. Adams

Bruce Sewell is an American lawyer and former general counsel of Apple until 2017. Sewell served on the company’s executive team and oversaw all legal matters, including corporate governance, intellectual property, litigation and securities compliance, as well as government affairs.

== Education ==
Sewell received his J.D. from George Washington University in 1986, and a Bachelor of Science degree from the University of Lancaster, in the United Kingdom, in 1979. He was admitted to the California Bar in 1986 and to the Washington, D.C., Bar in 1987. He is also admitted to practice before the United States Court of Appeals for the Federal Circuit.

== Career ==
Sewell was a partner in the litigation firm of Brown & Bain P.C.

He joined Intel in 1995 as a senior attorney assigned to counsel various business groups in areas such as antitrust compliance, licensing and intellectual property. In 2001, Sewell was promoted to vice president and deputy general counsel, managing Intel’s litigation portfolio, and handled corporate transactions including M&A activities. In 2003, he was promoted to General Counsel and became responsible for leading all of Intel's legal, corporate affairs and corporate social responsibility programs. He managed attorneys and policy professionals located in over 30 countries around the world.

Sewell joined Apple from Intel Corporation in September 2009. On December 8, 2017, Apple’s leadership page replaced his role with Katherine Adams, a newly appointed member of the team.
