= Cartmel College, Lancaster =

Constituent college of the University of Lancaster

Coordinates: 54.0037°N 2.7888°W

Cartmel College
- University of Lancaster
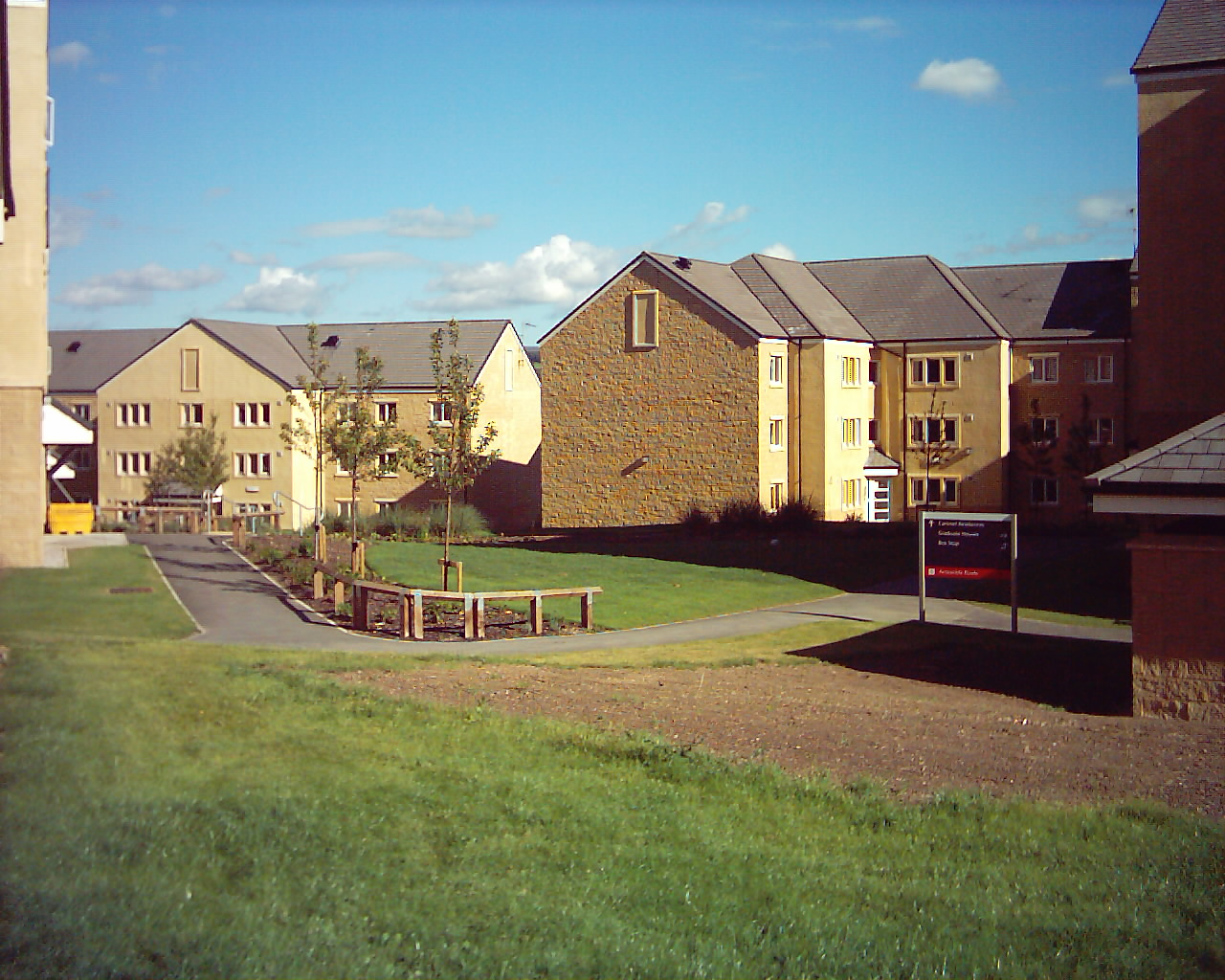
- Cartmel College – new site

- Cartmel Griffin
- Motto: Live The Dream
- Established: 1968
- Named for: Cartmel Peninsula
- Colours: Burgundy; Grey
- Principal: Leanne Taher-Bates
- JCR president: Luke Owen
- Administrator: Cath Fletcher
- Dean: Laura Davies
- Undergraduates: 1,880
- Newspaper: The Griffin
- Website: Cartmel College

Cartmel College is a residential college of Lancaster University, England and was founded in 1968. It is named after the Cartmel Peninsula of "Lancashire north of the sands" which was once known as The Land of Cartmel. The college buildings were originally sited at the north end of the university's Bailrigg campus and extended in 1969. In 2004, the college was relocated around Barker House Farm in a new development in the southwest of the campus called Alexandra Park.

== History ==
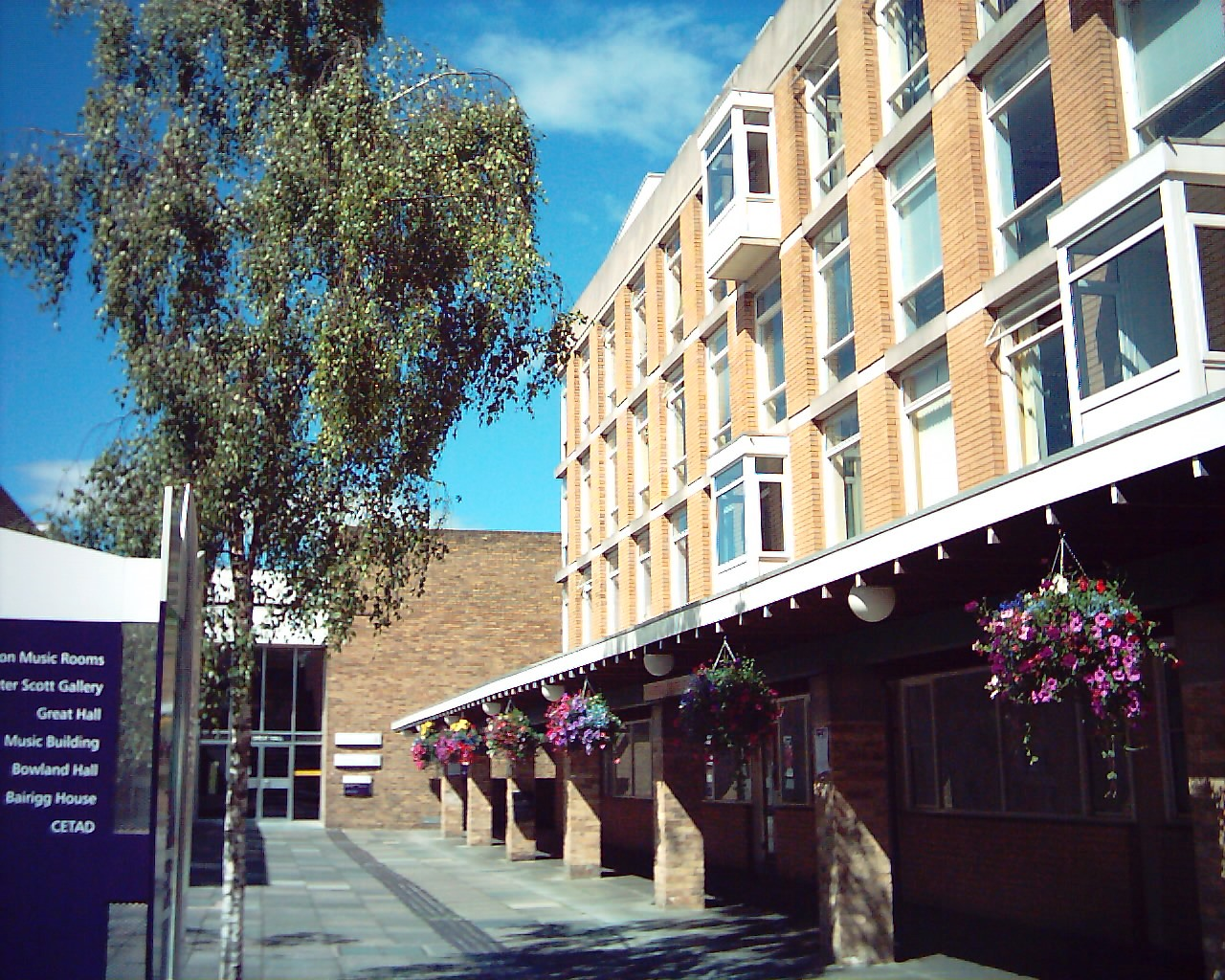
Old College buildings, now County South

Cartmel college residences were opened in 1968. The Cartmel building was designed by the Manchester-based architect, Haydyn Smith. Smith designed the college in such a way as to expose it to as much natural light as possible. The college was also dominated by a number of large, multi-purpose grassed areas that were very popular during the warmer months. Extra residences were built in 1969 to cope with the expanding student population.

=== Relocation ===
In 2003 Cartmel’s College Syndicate decided to embrace the university’s offer to relocate the college down to south west campus with brand new entirely en-suite accommodation and new facilities and college offices. After some negotiation it was decided that Cartmel would take the refurbished Barker House Farm complex as the centre of their college. The farm houses the college offices, porters lodge, bar and Junior Common Room, with the accommodation built around it. Along with Lonsdale and Fylde, Cartmel is one of only three Lancaster colleges to have entirely en-suite accommodation.

==== Names of residence blocks ====
The residence are all named after villages on the Cartmel peninsula:

- Bigland
- Braystones
- Broughton
- Cark
- Dalehead
- Flookburgh
- Grange
- Haverthwaite
- Holker
- Lindale
- Meathop

== Governance ==
The College is established under the Statutes of the University. Internally, the key committees which run the College are College Council, College Management and College Syndicate. College Management is an informal committee of College Officers which meets every alternate week to keep abreast of day-to-day matters to do with the running of the college. College Council meetings alternate with College Management. College Council consists of College Officers and the JCR executive and is, essentially, the body which concerns general policy of the college. College Syndicate meets much less often and consists of all SCR members and some JCR representatives. Its main responsibility is to decide matters of major policy affecting the College. The College is represented by the Principal on Senate, as is the JCR through various student representative bodies. College affairs come under a Pro Vice Chancellor of Colleges, who oversees the general conduct of the Colleges, including the appointment of College Officers, the setting of budgets and so on.

=== Junior Common Room Executive ===
The JCR Executive represents Cartmel students on various Student Union bodies, including Union Assembly, Social Committees, Welfare Committees, Communications Committees, Democracy Committee and Sports Committees.

== Symbolism ==
The college colours are burgundy and grey, or officially, stone and plonk. The college emblem is the griffin. The college pose is the Ertz.

== Facilities ==
Cartmel College's facilities on campus include 2 large projection screens, a large bar area, study room, food court and a Junior Common Room which houses 3 pool tables, DJ booth, darts boards, air hockey table, table tennis equipment, table football and a 40" Plasma Television complete with PS4, DVD player, Freeview and Laptop connection.

The whole Barker house complex and all residences have wireless internet throughout.

== Notable alumni ==
- Lucy Briers, Actress
- Simon Danczuk, Former MP for Rochdale
- Suzanne Evans, Former Deputy Chairman of the UK Independence Party
- Andrew Ford, Composer
- Theresa Griffin, Former MEP for North West England
- Rainer Hersch, Comedian and musician
- Janni Howker, Writer of teenage fiction
- Cat Smith, MP for Lancaster and Fleetwood
- Paul Bristow, Mayor of Cambridgeshire and Peterborough
