= Lonsdale College, Lancaster =

Constituent college of the University of Lancaster

Coordinates: 54.00435°N 2.78933°W

Lonsdale College
- University of Lancaster
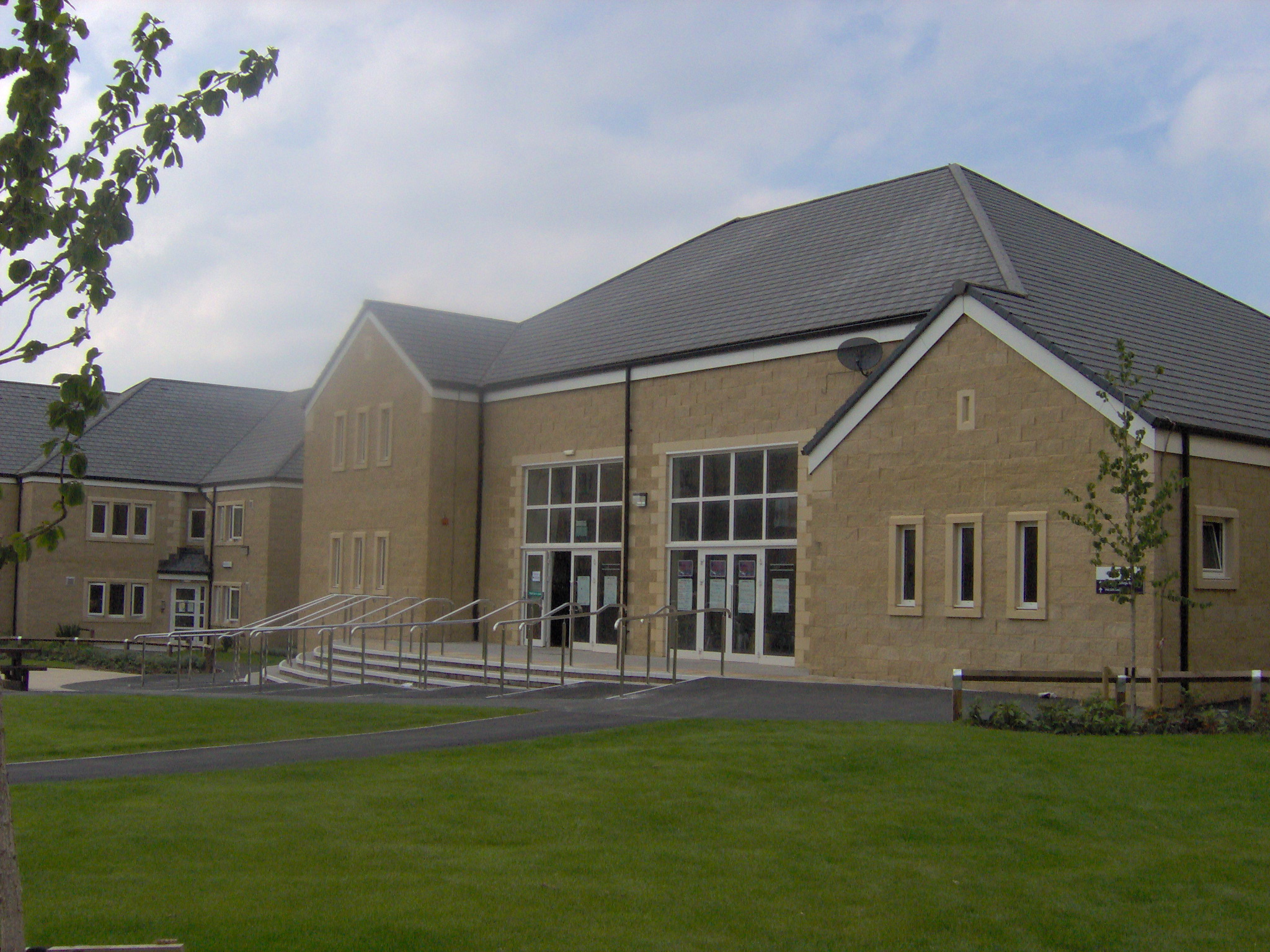
- College bar

- College logo
- Location: Alexandra Park
- Motto: Simply the best
- Established: 1964
- Named for: Lonsdale Hundred
- Colours: Blue
- Principal: Sherry Currington (acting)
- JCR President: Kate Bracewell
- Dean: Sherry Currington
- Undergraduates: 1990
- Website: Lonsdale College

Lonsdale College is a constituent college of Lancaster University. It was one of the two founding colleges, originally built when the university first opened in 1964. It is also one of the largest colleges on campus in terms of Junior Common Room membership, with over 1,900 undergraduates. Like most other colleges in the university, the college is named after a region of the traditional county of Lancashire. The college takes its name from the Lonsdale area, the valley of the River Lune. The college is not to be confused with the fictional Lonsdale College, Oxford which is attended by Inspector Morse in Endeavour based on the novels by Colin Dexter, However, Morse studied at St John's College, Oxford in the novels and the original series. Members of Lonsdale are referred to as Lonsdelians.

== History ==
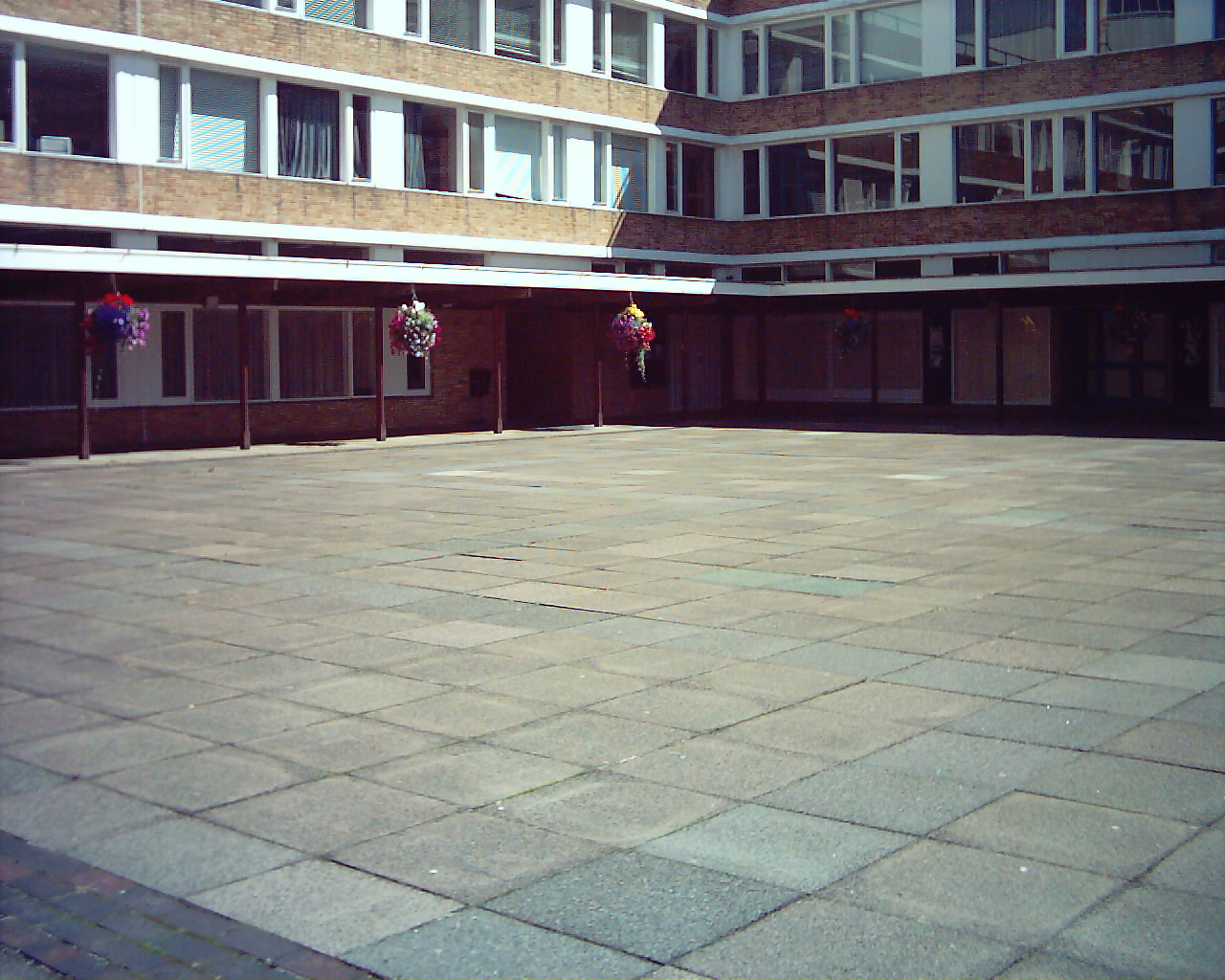
The old college quadrangle, given to Bowland College in 2004

The college was originally located in what is now Bowland North to the north of Alexandra Square. The college was designed in tandem with Bowland and was in fact designed as a mirror image of it.

In 2004 the college moved, along with Cartmel College to some of the newly built buildings to the south of the main campus in Alexandra Park. Its original buildings were transferred to the other founding college, Bowland, and became known as Bowland North.

== Facilities ==
Lonsdale College has a computer lab, a study room, and a launderette.

=== Residences ===
Just over half of the college's students live in college at any one time. Other Lonsdale students live in Lancaster city centre. The residential buildings housing the college's entirely en-suite accommodation are named after places in the Lonsdale area. Residential buildings are reallocated from year to year for administrative convenience so which are Lonsdelian ones is subject to change each year.

== Governance ==
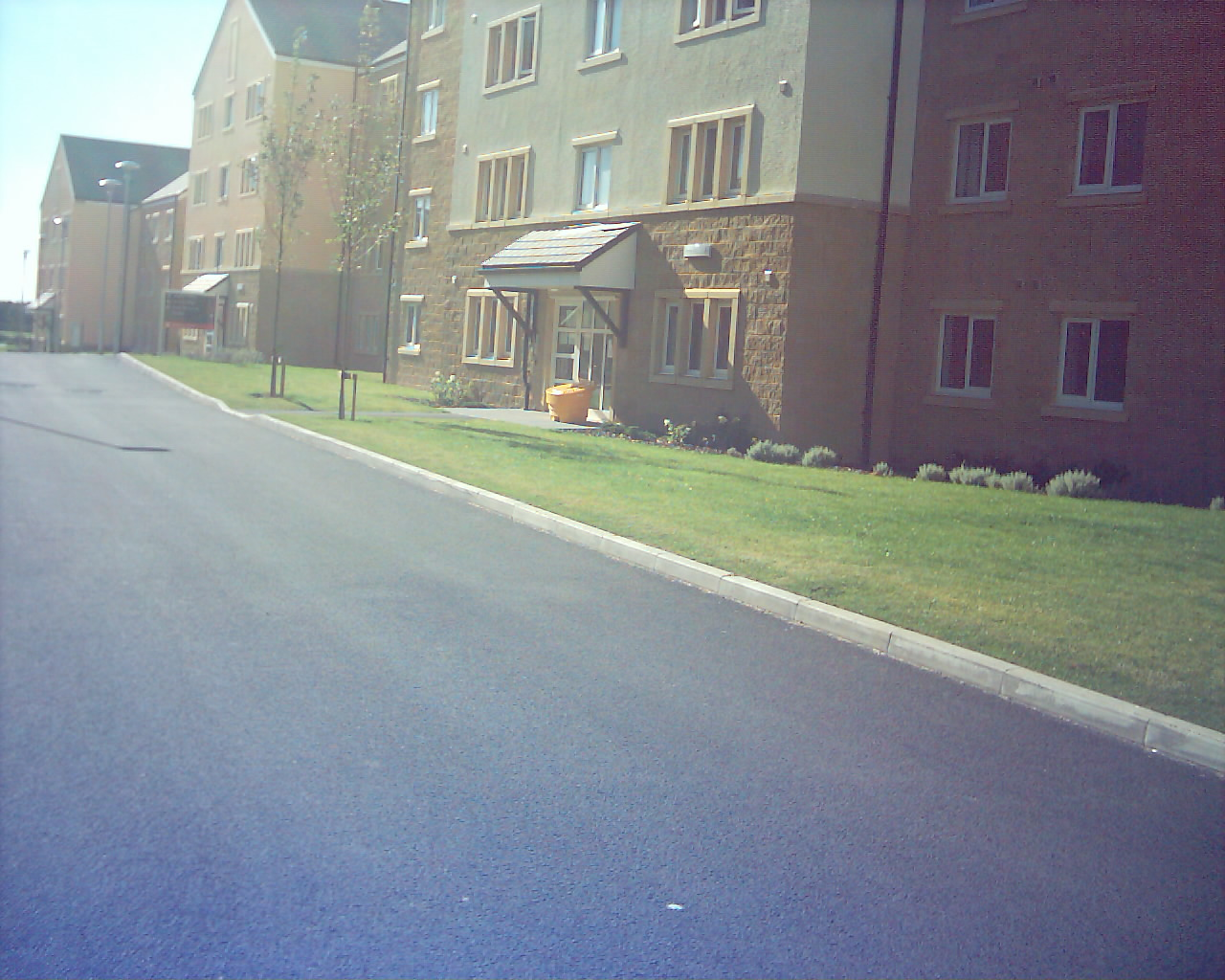
Lonsdale College

The college is established under the statutes of the university. Internally, the key committee which runs the college is the College Syndicate.

The current acting principal is Sherry Currington, who is also the dean.

Current student President is George Nagle, and student Vice-President is Nathan Mooney, as of 2023.

== College symbols ==
The college logo features an heraldic "leopard", the name given in heraldry to a lion "passant guardant" i.e. walking from right to left with face turned towards the viewer.

== Junior Common Room ==
The Junior Common Room consists of all Lonsdelian undergraduates. The term JCR is often used in reference to the junior common room's elected executive committee. The executive committee undertake a variety of tasks, ranging from organising social events to co-ordinating sports, producing publicity and offering an education and welfare service.

=== Social Events ===
Lonsdale College supports academic study, providing facilities including a quiet study room and a computer room. Sport is central to college life, with a number of successful college sports teams, including football, netball and bar sports, consisting of both men's and women's darts and pool teams, as well as a unisex dominos team. Both the first and second Lonsdale Football teams won their respective collegiate leagues in 2017/18. Lonsdale was the first winner of the inter-college Rugby sevens cup in 1969. It continues this success in the annual Founders sports competition against Bowland College, and in the Carter Shield competitions. Students can use the Senior Common Room for music practice, and a number of clubs and societies regularly meet in the college. Lonsdale College also has a long-standing reputation for holding some of the best attended social events on campus.

== Notable alumni ==
- Joseph Delaney, Writer
- Robert Fisk, Middle East correspondent, The Independent
- Joan Humble, Former MP for Blackpool North & Fleetwood
- Colin Pickthall, Former MP for Lancashire West
- Peter Whalley, Writer
- Helen Southworth, Former MP for Warrington South
- Piri, Musician
