= York Conferences =

Commercial subsidiary of the University of York

York Conferences is a subsidiary of the University of York (York, England) and is the commercial body responsible for the organisation and management of conferences and events across the University of York's two campuses: Campus West and Campus East in York; With a maximum venue capacity of 1,190, the venues at the University of York host some of the largest events in North Yorkshire.

Currently, the York Conferences office is based at the University of York's West Campus in Grimston House.

2020 marked fifty years since the first conference officer was appointed in 1970.

York Conferences are accredited by the Meetings Industry Association (MIA). In addition, in 2009 York Conference Park Ltd achieved the Customer First and Investors In People (IIP) standards.

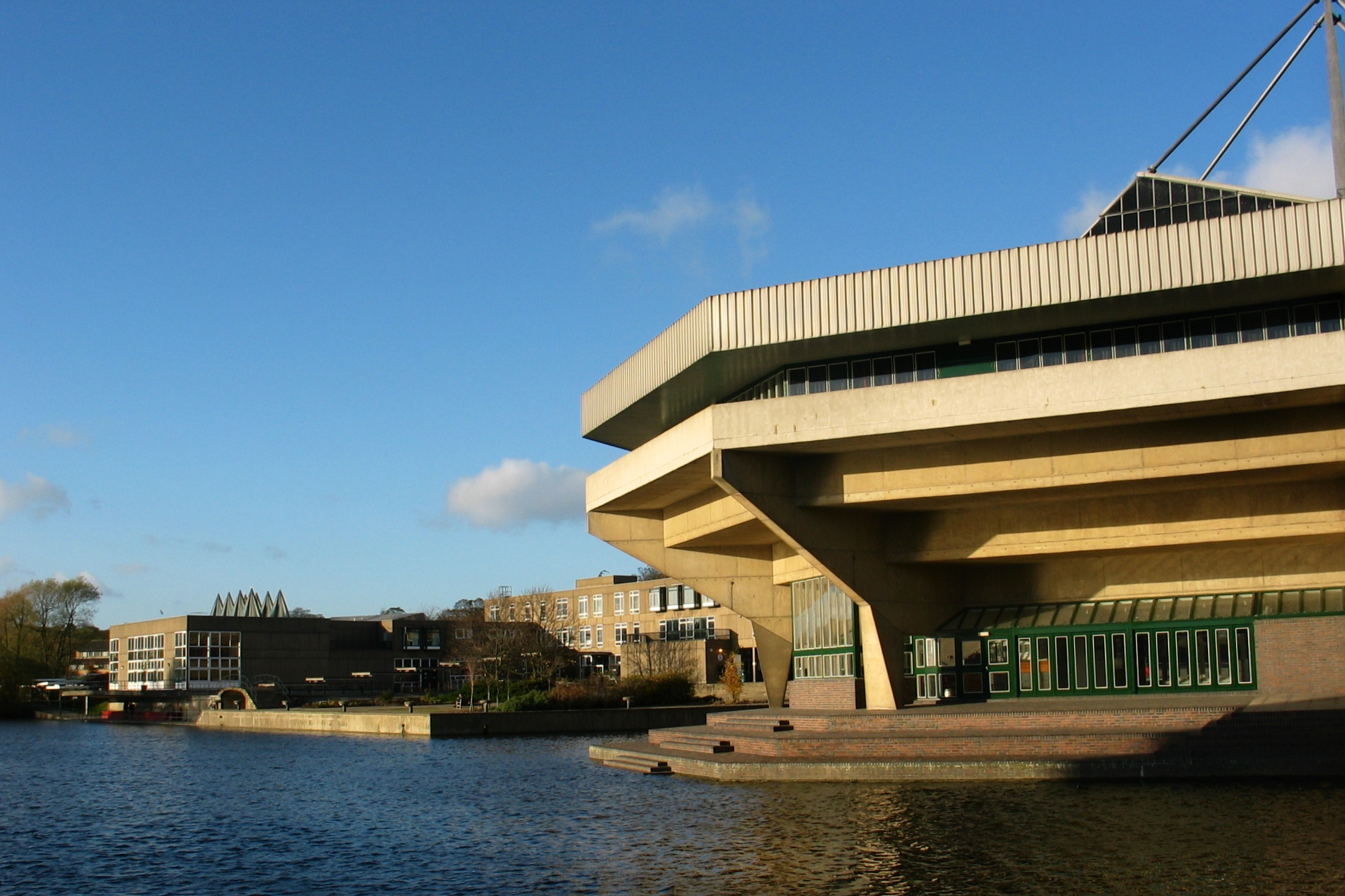
Central Hall

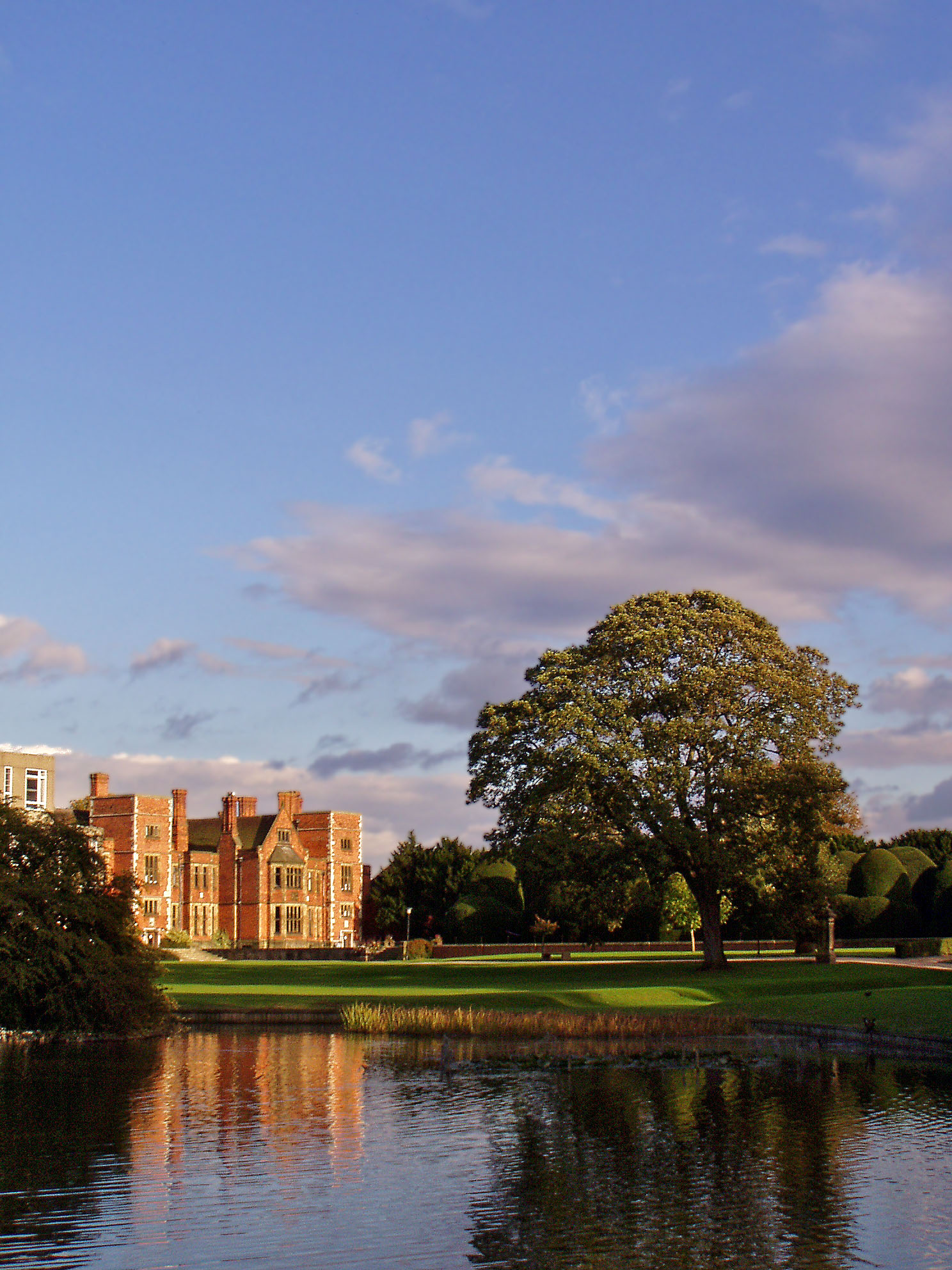
Heslington Hall

== Notable Previous Clients ==
- General Synod of the Church of England
- Samaritans
- Citizens Advice Bureau
- Royal Society for the Protection of Birds
- Association of University Chief Security Officers
- Bat Conservation Trust
