= David Kato College, York =

College of the University of York, England

David Kato College
- University of York
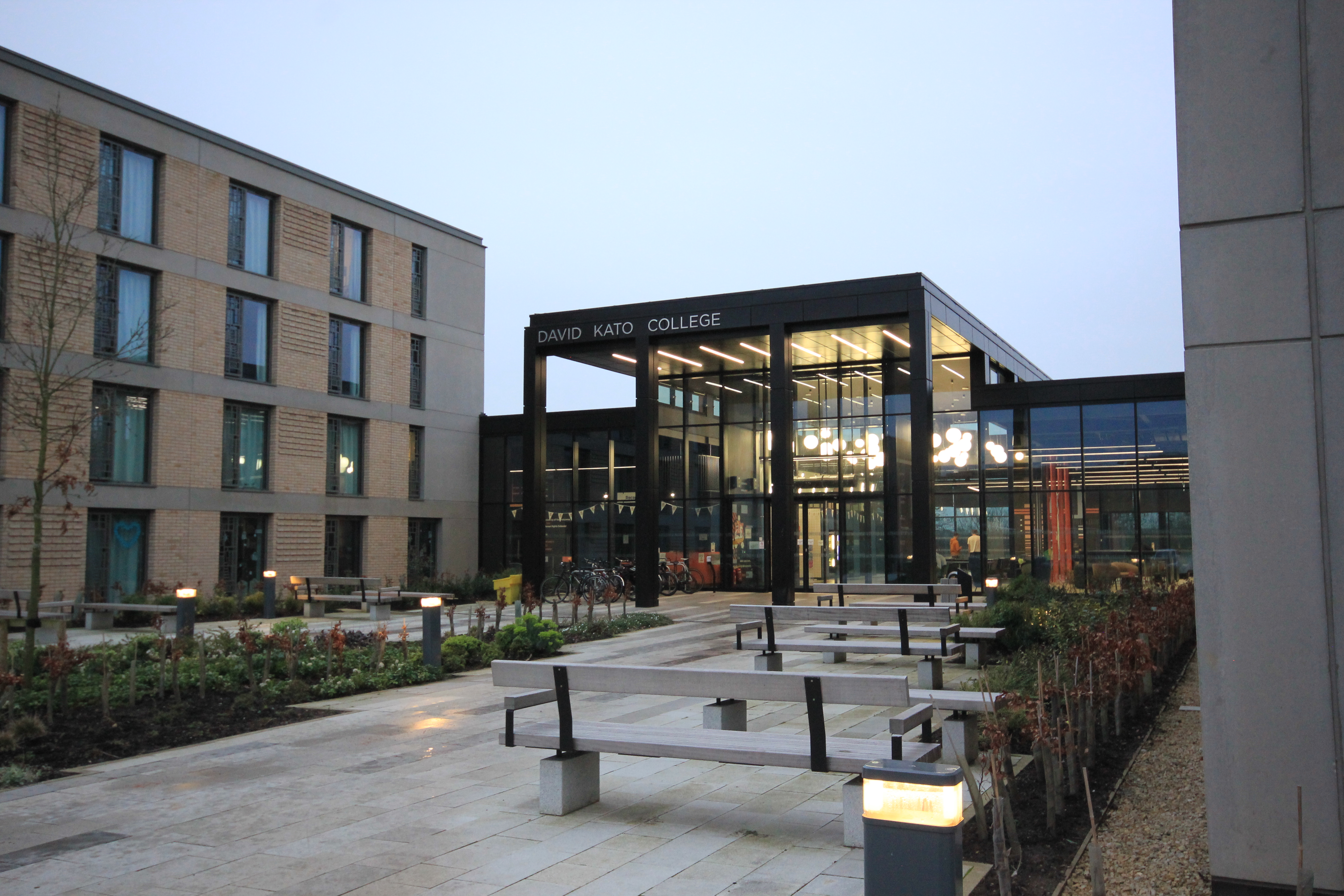
- David Kato college hub
- Location: Heslington East, York
- Coordinates: 53°56′47″N 1°02′01″W
- Established: 2022
- Named for: David Kato
- Architect: Natalia Maximova
- Architectural style: New Brutalism
- College Manager: Sarah Hay
- Deputy College Manager: Paula Mountain Agar
- Undergraduates: 545 (2022/2023)
- Postgraduates: 60 (2022/2023)
- Website: David Kato College
- Student association: David Kato College Student Association

David Kato College is a college of the University of York and was founded in 2022. The college was named after the Ugandan teacher and LGBT rights activist David Kato, who is considered a father of Uganda's gay rights movement, and who had studied at York shortly before his murder in 2011.

== History ==
Part of a 400,000 sqf addition to Campus East consisting of 1,480 beds and costing £130 million, David Kato College along with Anne Lister College form a new student accommodation centre. David Kato consists of nine blocks arranged over three to four floors with a central community Hub containing study spaces, a laundry room, and social spaces. The design focuses on modern design principles and sustainability but also borrows some architectural elements from existing buildings on campus such as the university's iconic 1960s covered walkways.

The university announced in June 2021, during Refugee Week, that the college would be named after David Kato. David Kato College opened to students in September 2022 and was officially opened on 14 March 2023.

=== College shield ===
The college shield was one of 22 entries to a competition to design it. The scroll has the phrase 'A luta continua', which translates as 'the struggle continues'. It has connections to David Kato from its use by his supporters at his funeral, but is not the motto of the college.

== Student association ==
The students of David Kato are represented by the David Kato College Student Association (CSA), who are responsible for planning events for students to attend.

== Services ==
David Kato has a range of room types, all of which are ensuite. Each room has access to a communal kitchen shared by 6–10 people. While the rooms are classed as self-catered, like other Campus East colleges students can attend the weekly college meal held in the Piazza Building, which is included with rent.

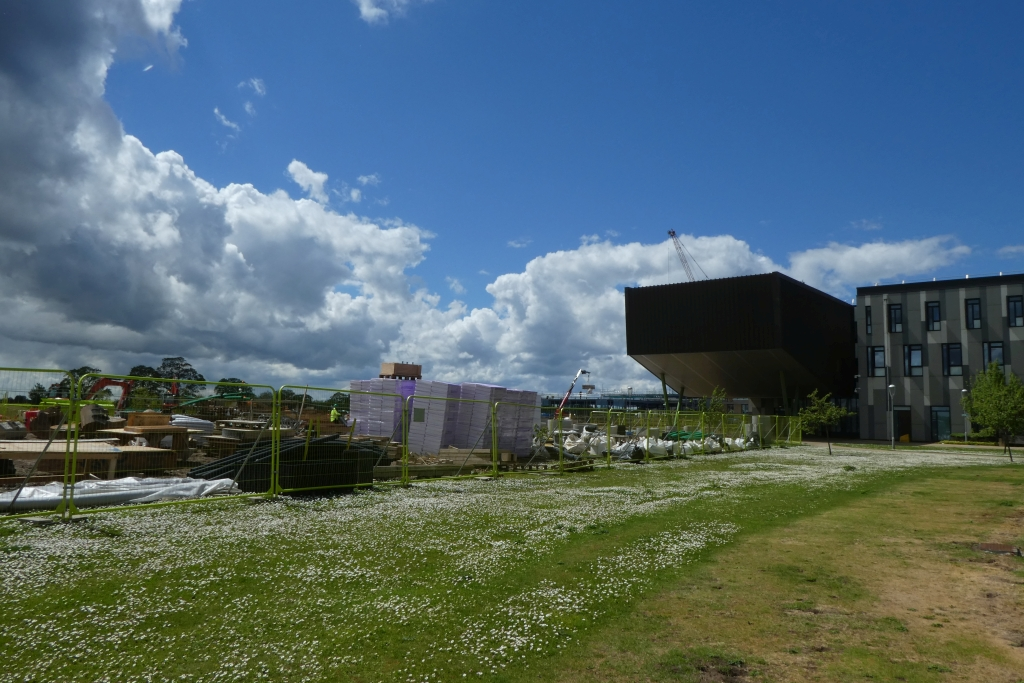
David Kato college under construction

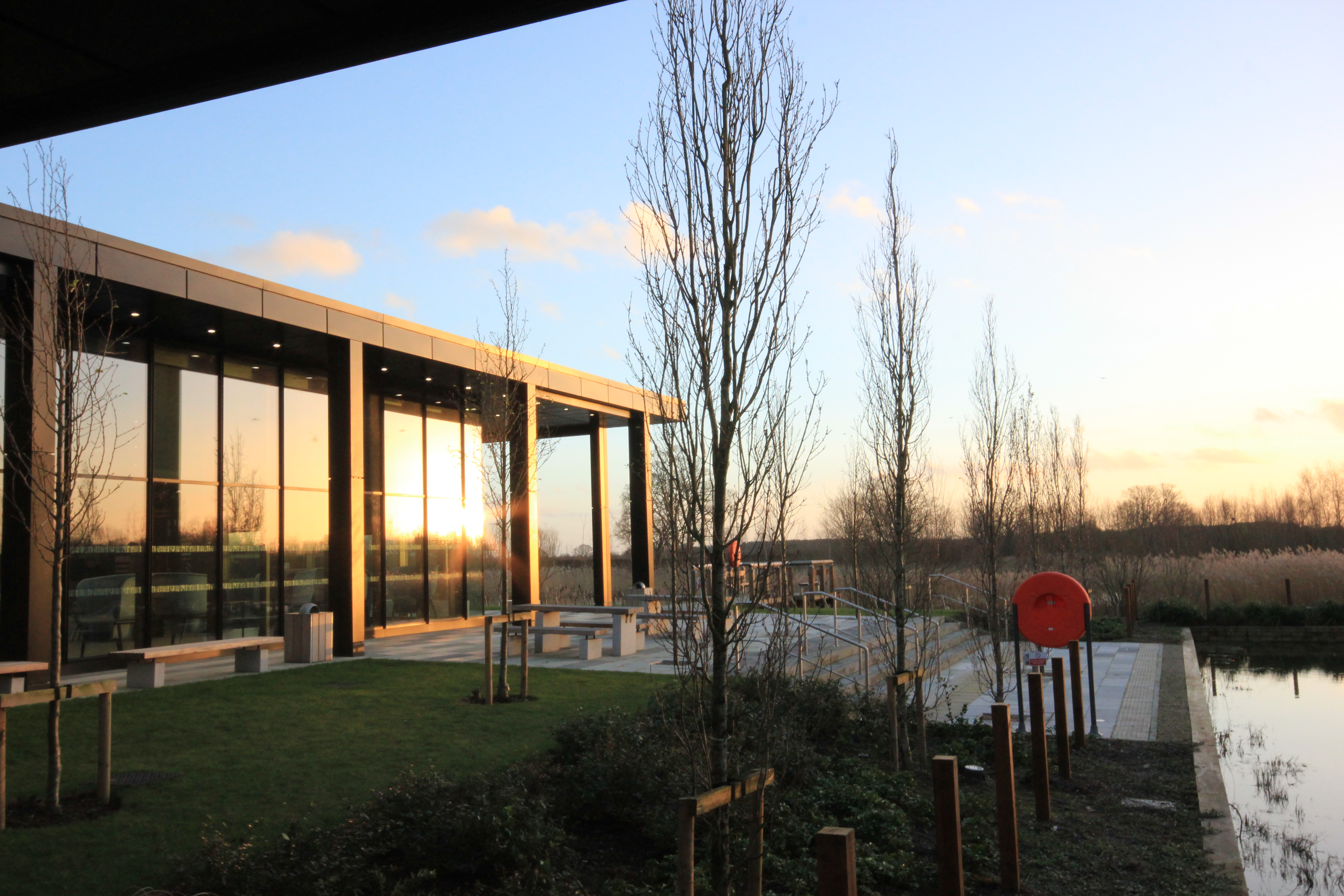
Outside of David Kato hub
