= Anne Lister College, York =

Anne Lister College
- University of York
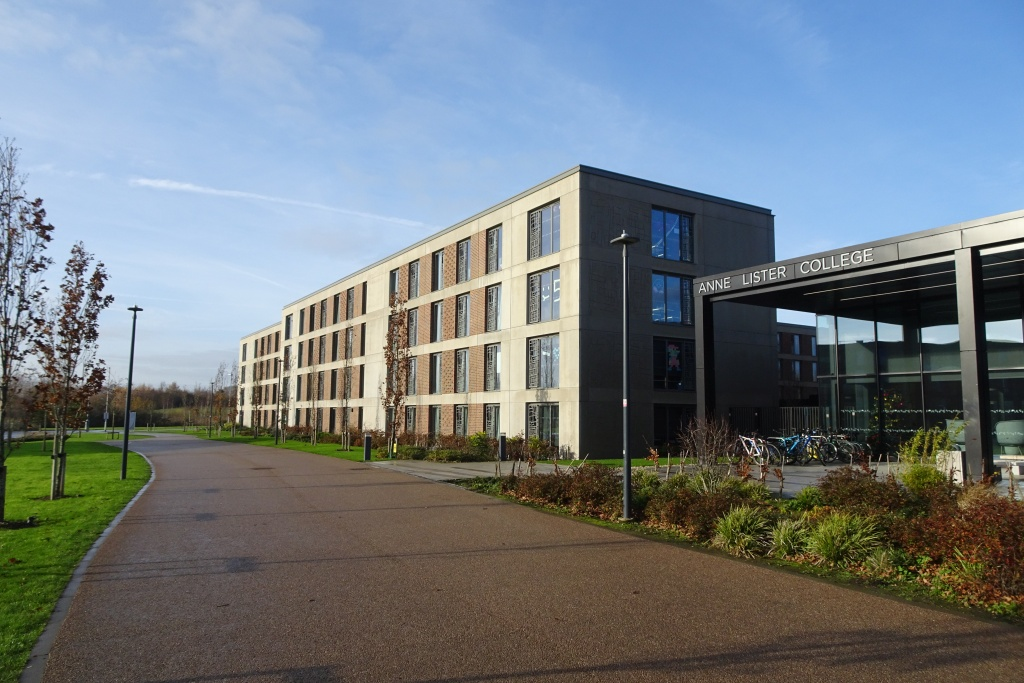
- Location: Campus East, York
- Coordinates: 53°56′52″N 1°02′05″W
- Motto: Ҩ2θ3=5–3)56ρ2∩3
- Motto in English: Have some courage
- Established: 2021
- Named for: Anne Lister
- Architect: Natalia Maximova
- Architectural style: New Brutalism
- College Manager: Tom Metcalf
- Deputy College Manager: Sam Haley
- Undergraduates: 855 (2022/2023)
- Postgraduates: 110 (2022/2023)
- Mascot: Jackie the Jackalope
- Website: Anne Lister College
- Student association: Anne Lister College Student Association

Anne Lister College is one of the constituent colleges of the University of York. Located on Campus East, it is named after Anne Lister, a Yorkshire diarist and landowner, and was opened in 2021.

== History ==
Work began on the new college in November 2019, with work on David Kato College occurring simultaneously. The name of the college was announced in January 2021. The Anne Lister Society played a significant role in convincing the university that it would be suitable to name a college after Anne Lister. The college was officially opened 21 October 2021.

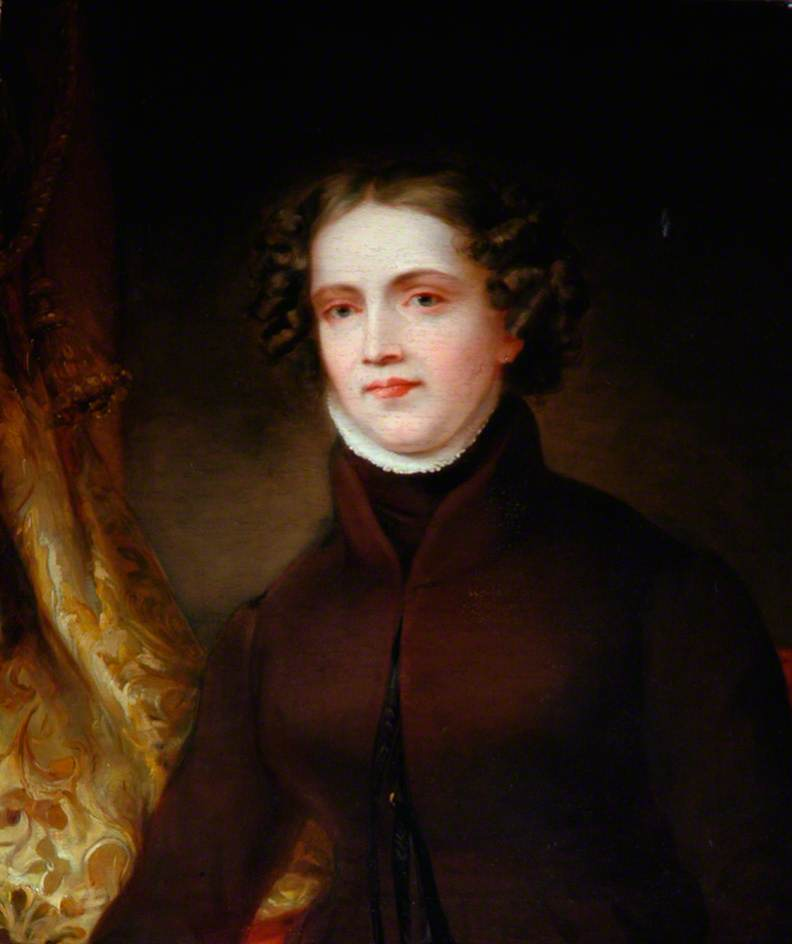
Portrait of Anne Lister the college's Eponym (1791–1840), by Joshua Horner

Anne Lister College partly opened in October 2021, then fully opened in January 2022. Until the college was at full capacity, students had to be housed in separate cities. Most undergraduates lived in University Quarter in Hull, which normally serves as accommodation for University of Hull students. The university provided a shuttle bus to allow students to attend lectures and offered to pay 10% of rent in Hull. This was increased to 25% after pressure from the students, a move supported by the University of York Student Union. It was due to these circumstances that the affected undergraduates created their own group chat titled 'The Hulligans'. Ultimately, the shuttle bus service cost the university an estimated £230,650, which was £3,300 per day. This covered 22 daily bus journeys, 11 from Hull-York and 11 from York-Hull, with the earliest bus being 07:25 and the latest being 02:00.

Anne Lister was one of only two colleges which were made available by the university to accept returner students for the 2022–2023 academic year.

== Buildings and services ==
The college is roughly split into two separate quadrangle, with accommodation blocks around the side. Pergolas lead from the Hub to the accommodation blocks. The western quadrangle contains A, B, C, and D blocks while the eastern quadrangle contains F, G, H, and I blocks. Fencing and gates between the blocks make the college a gated one, with the exception of J Block. J block was built as part of the David Kato project, with the concrete panel sculpting and the window frames both being the pattern of David Kato College. It borders the east side of the Kato-Lister Green.

The Hub is the main social space at the college. It contains laundry facilities, the College Team's offices, reception, common room, and the Quiet Space. To encourage easy socialisation and to cope with large events, the common room is not enclosed but architectural panelling gives it a sense of form.

The Quiet Space is effectively a second common room, but the strength of the college's egalitarian spirit restricts it from any form of separation by designation. It contains sofas, a printer, Amazon lockers, and a library. It also has a serving hatch to the college kitchen, where the weekly brunch is prepared.

The college is self-catered, with students having access to flat kitchens. College members are encouraged to attend the weekly college meal in the Piazza Building.

=== Design ===
Architects Sheppard Robson planned design of Anne Lister College intentionally incorporated the layout of the landscape into the design, to help the buildings to fit into the scenery. To do this, the arrangement of storeys sought to replicate the outline of the ground that it was built on. The style of buildings were also designed to reflect the brutalist appearance of the 1960s buildings on West Campus, using pre-cast concrete sections along with brick. The original colleges were characterised by covered walkways and quadrangles, so these elements were central in designs. Also, by funnelling entrance and exit through the Hub, it is hoped to encourage a strong social and community environment.

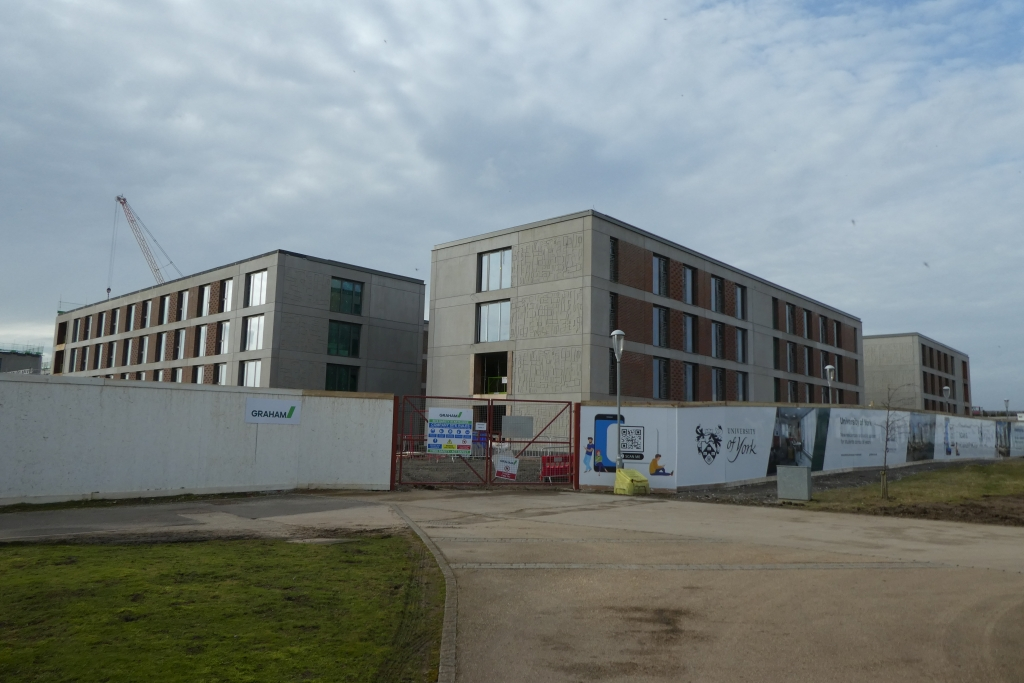
Anne Lister buildings during construction

Anne Lister College and David Kato College were constructed in the same £130 million project, with Anne Lister College costing £64 million. Altogether, the two colleges contain 1,480 student beds. The project was constructed using 'innovative modern techniques', utilising prefabrication to both reduce heat loss and decrease construction time. The college consists of 23,280 square meters of floor space spread across nine blocks.

The college design got the award for the 'Multi residential Built' in the 2022 MSA Awards. In May 2023 the college was one of six projects awarded with the RIBA Yorkshire regional award and is now in the running for the national award.

== Student association ==
Anne Lister has a College Student Association Committee (CSAC), which represents all student members of the college. It organises regular weekly events like Taco in a Bag, boardgame nights, and film nights, as well as large events like Freshers Week, Refreshers Week, and formals.
