= University of York, Campus East =

Campus of the University of York

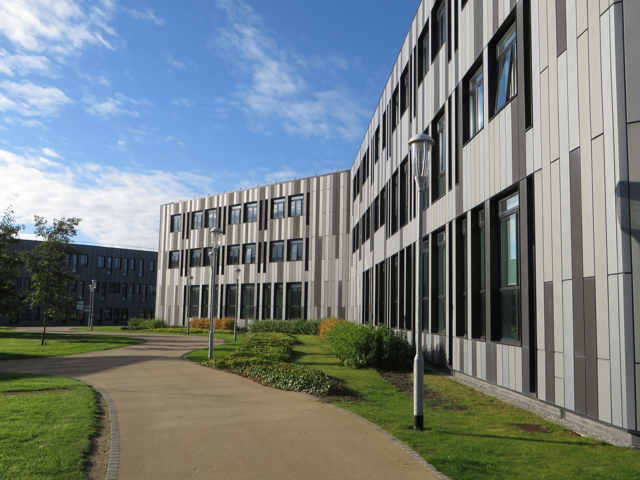
- Established: 2006
- Parent institution: University of York
- Location: Heslington, York, Yorkshire, England
- Campus: 287 acres (116 ha); Countryside

Campus East is a 287 acres (116 ha) site which is part of the University of York. The campus is situated around a 35 acres (14 ha) lake mirroring the design of Campus West. The site currently contains five colleges (Langwith, Goodricke, Constantine, Anne Lister, and David Kato) along with social hubs and academic departments.

== History ==
In 2004 it was recognised that the original campus was becoming over developed and in order to retain its countryside appearance plans were developed to build on arable land east of campus west. The plans were accepted in May 2007. The original name for Campus East was Heslington East.

In May 2008 the City of York planners approved the design for the residential college. It was decided that, rather than create a new college, an existing college should be moved. Ultimately, Goodricke College was selected. and moved onto the new campus in 2009. Their old buildings were taken over by James College. In The Press on 28 July 2008, Shepherd Construction was named as the preferred contractor for the college buildings. Their proposal included landscaping the whole area, constructing a lake with marsh borders, planting light woodland and many specimen trees, and maximising biodiversity. Archaeological excavations prior to construction revealed evidence of human habitation 2000–3000 years before present. The excavations also uncovered the Heslington Brain, a remarkably well-preserved human brain dating from the Iron Age.

Construction began in 2008, with the first buildings, including Goodricke, coming into use in October 2009. The new Goodricke buildings were officially opened by the Duke of York in April 2010. In 2012 Langwith College moved to new buildings on Campus East, with Derwent College occupying their old building. 2014 saw the first establishment of a new college on Campus East, which was named Constantine College after the Roman emperor Constantine the Great.

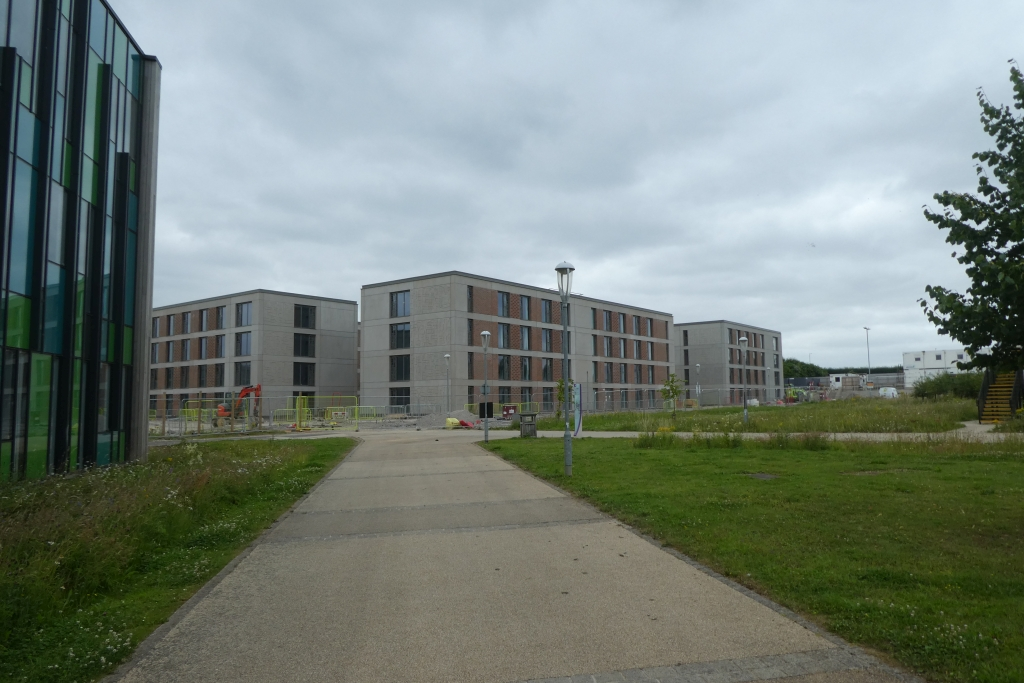
Anne Lister College, York

Work began in December 2019 to build a further two new colleges on Campus East. These would eventually become Anne Lister College and David Kato College. These consist of around 1,400 new student bedrooms as well as new social spaces. The university says that "development has been designed to optimise the beautiful landscape and will be built with respect for the existing ecological diversity around the lake". Construction on the new colleges was completed in 2022. In May 2023, Anne Lister was one of 6 projects to receive the RIBA regional Yorkshire award.

== Departments ==
Computer Science

The Department of Computer Science move into its new buildings on Campus East in September 2010. To celebrate 50 years of computer science at York the Computer Science building was renamed The Ian Wand Building in 2022, after Professor Ian Wand, the second head of department.

Institute for Safe Autonomy

Launched in 2024 in a purpose built £45 million building next to Constantine College, the institute aims to aid research into how AI can be made "safe for everyday use". The facility is a collaborative space for more than 100 researchers across several departments including, Computer Science, Engineering, Physics, Law, Management and Philosophy. The project also aims to be self-sufficient by 2025 using an onsite solar farm.

York Law School and sociology

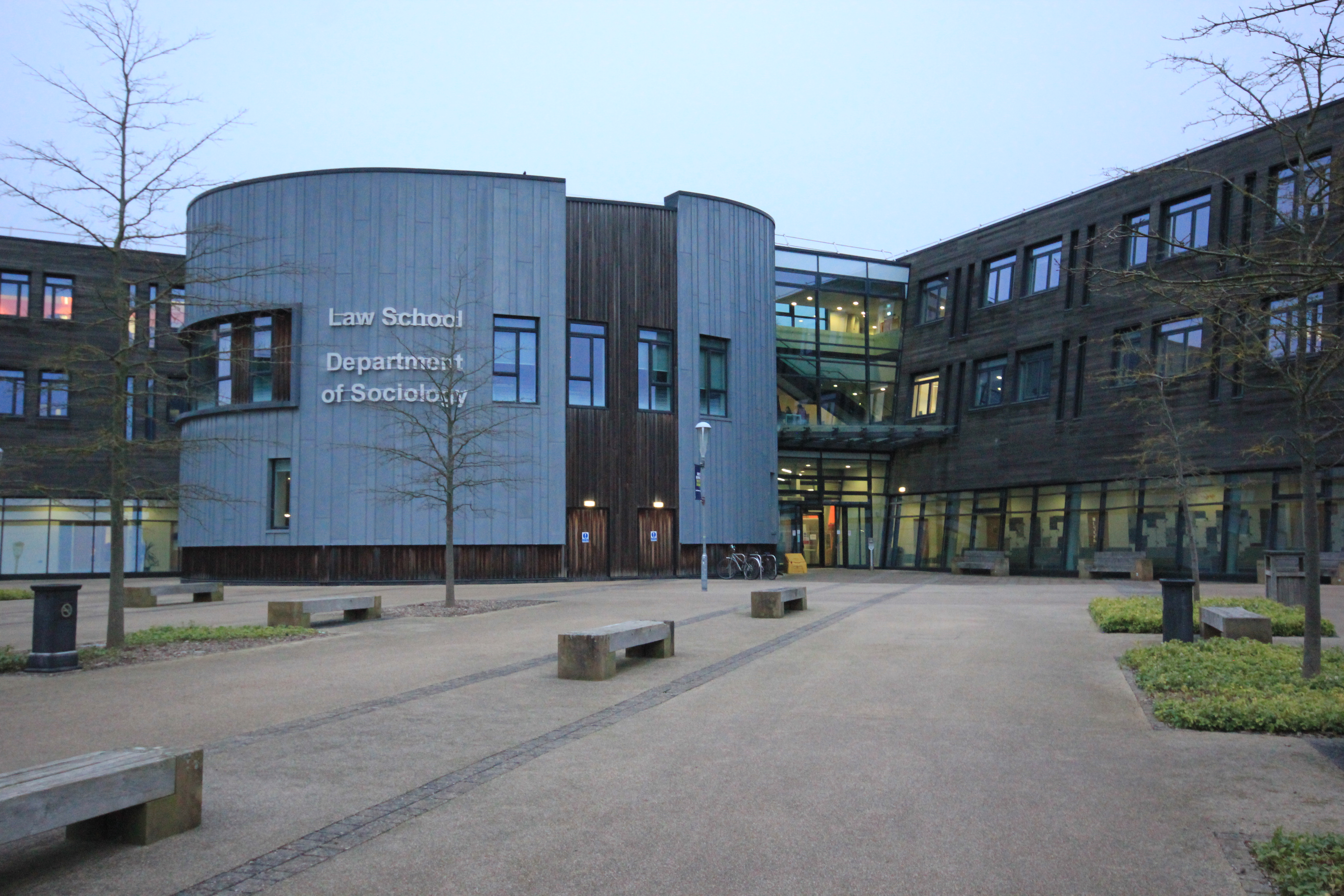
Law and Sociology building

The York Law School, which opened in 2008, moved into the then Law and Management building on Campus East in 2010. The department currently offers both undergraduate and graduate degrees with a focus on problem based learning, being the only university to do so. When the Department of Sociology moved into the building in 2021, the building was given its current name of the Law and Sociology building.

School of Arts and Creative Technologies

The school will amalgamate the Department of Music with the Department of Theatre, Film, Television and Interactive Media. When complete, the new school will be housed in the Ron Cooke Hub, which is scheduled to open late in 2024 after being refurbished. It previously house the 24-hour reception on Campus East. This service has now moved to the Law and Sociology building.

== Buildings ==
=== Piazza Building ===
Piazza Building
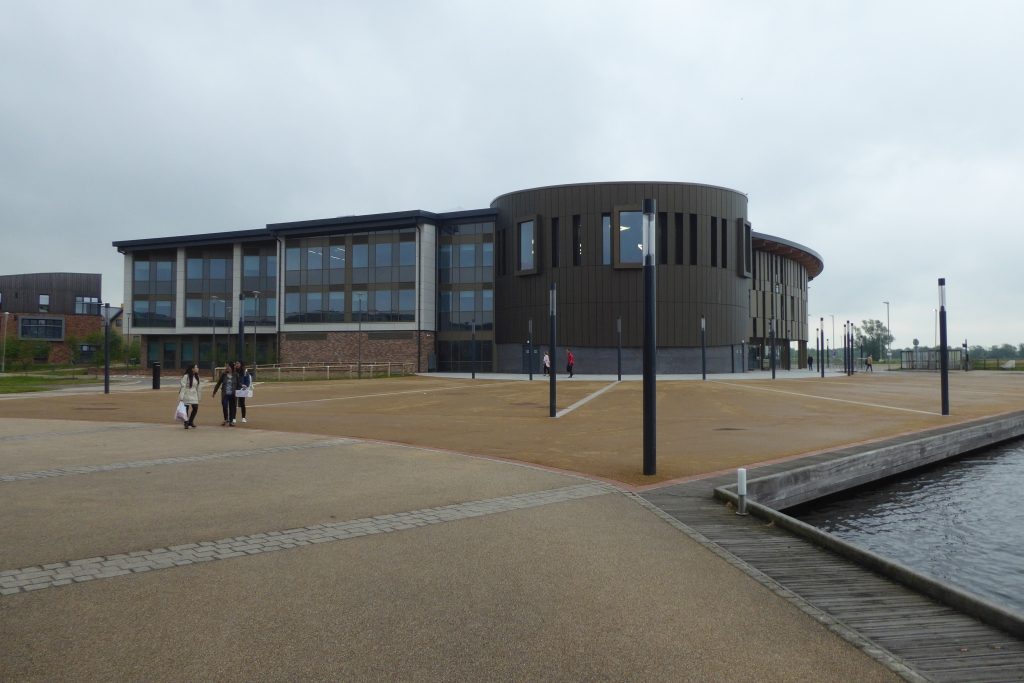

General information
- Construction started: January 2018
- Completed: January 2018
- Cost: £17 million
- Owner: University of York

Technical details
- Floor count: 3
- Floor area: 6,800 m^{2} (73,000 sq ft)

Design and construction
- Architect: Tim Robinson
- Architecture firm: Race Cottam

The Piazza Building is located next to Langwith College. The building was designed by Race Cottam Architects and was completed in January 2018. The site is also home to the International Pathway College.

==== Design ====
The building's layout follows a U-shape plan with a large wall of glazing covered by a screen at the main entrance. The external façade of the building is made of bricks and fibre cement panels with a contrasting section clad in aluminium.

==== Facilities ====
The interior is based around the central 3 storey atrium which on the ground floor houses the Piazza restaurant. Besides housing the International Pathway College, the Piazza Building also contains two laboratories, a 350-seat lecture theatre, and a 100-seat lecture room. A study space termed the 'Library@Piazza' is located on the second floor.

=== Ron Cooke Hub ===
Ron Cooke Hub
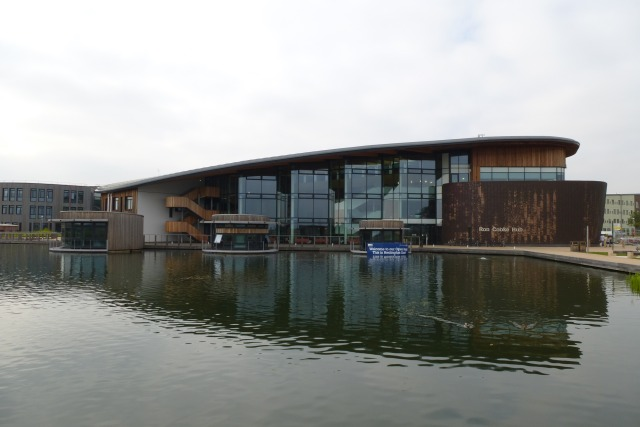
- View of Ron Cooke Hub from lake

General information
- Type: Social Hub
- Completed: October 2010
- Cost: £20 million
- Owner: University of York

Technical details
- Floor count: 4
- Floor area: 6,300 m^{2} (68,000 sq ft)

Design and construction
- Architect: BDP
- Awards: York Design Award 2011

The Ron Cooke Hub is located next to the Computer Science Department and situated on the edge of the 35 acre lake. Located on the lake are three "floating study pods" which are available for students to book. The building was designed by Building Design Partnership (BDP) and was completed in October 2010. The following year the building was awarded with a York Design Award.

==== Design ====
The building is centred around an atrium which acts as the main circulating space and also contains the Hub's café. wherever possible the specific elements of the design were included to limit the buildings carbon footprint such as using exposed concrete ceilings to allow for passive cooling.

==== Facilities ====
The Hub contains a 24 hour study location for students as well as containing various seminar rooms which are available for booking. The site also contains the York Digital Creativity Labs which offers a "multidisciplinary approach to tackling research challenges" helping to improve cross collaboration and innovation.

=== The Catalyst building ===
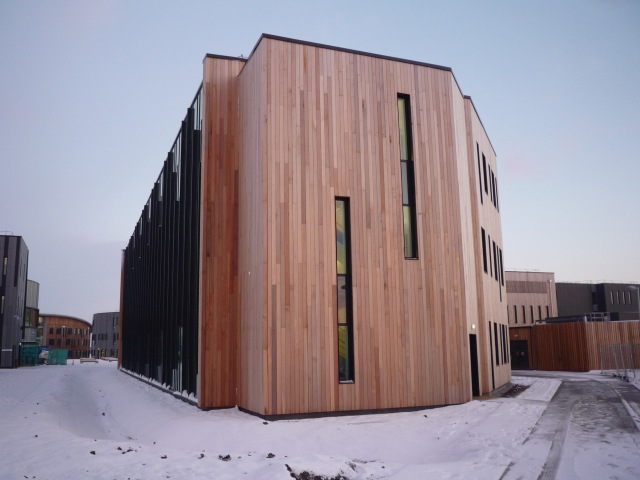
The Catalyst building

The 3,000 sqm building was completed in 2011 by the building firm BDP at a cost of over £4.7 million. The centre supports early businesses in the IT, digital, and media sectors with connections to the nearby department of computer science.

== Future developments ==
As part of York local plan the university is currently developing expansion plans for campus east. The current plans include further academic departments and student housing located south of the current campus. The design of this addition to campus east includes an additional 177,000 square metres (1,910,000 sq ft) of floor space across the 65 hectares (160 acres) site. These plans also include a second lake to be added to campus east to assist in drainage. The plan involves the removal of some land from the green belt which has been a point of contention for some arguing against the project.

== See also ==
- Heslington Brain
