= Constantine College, York =

College of the University of York, England

Coordinates: 53.94908°N 1.02525°W

Constantine College
- University of York
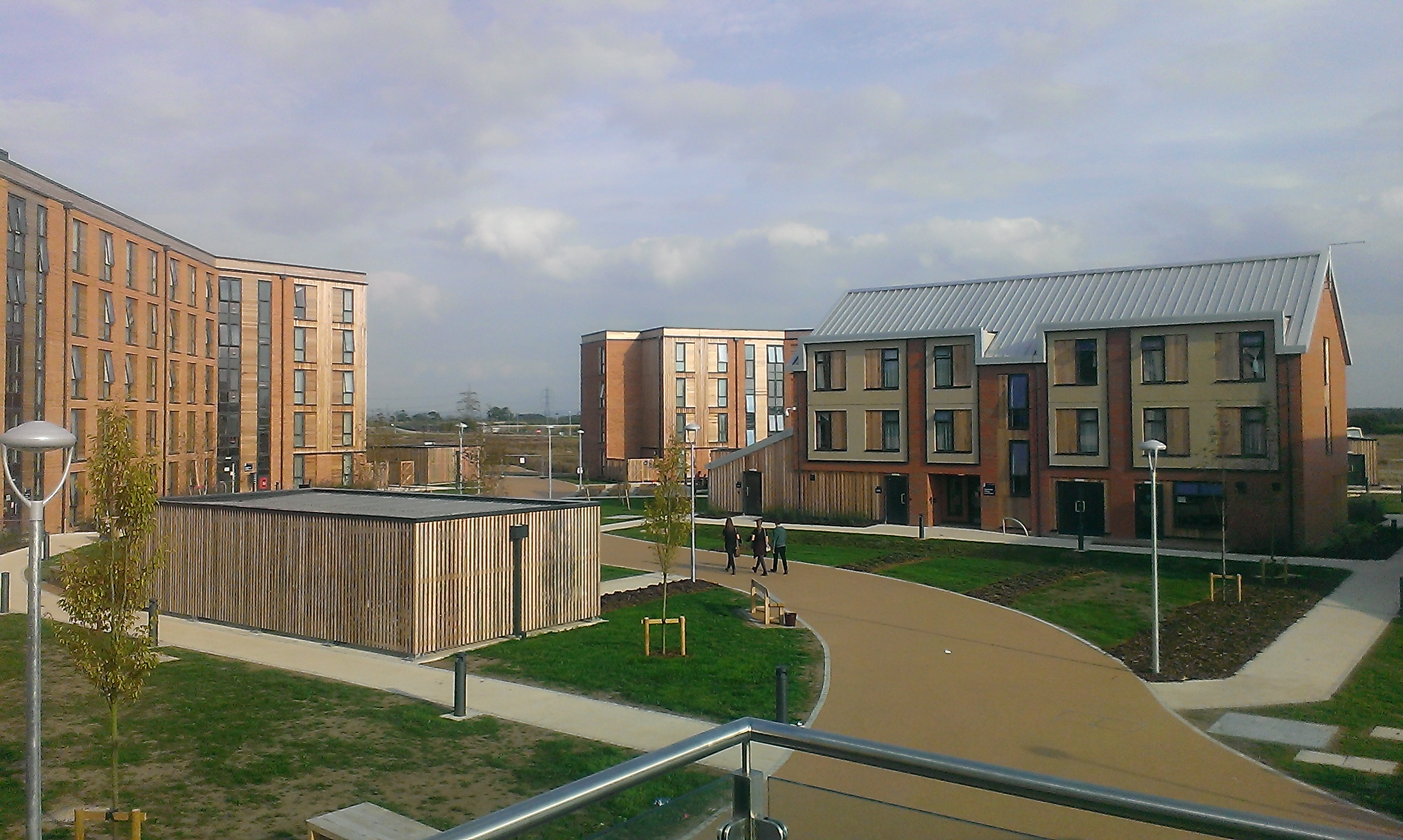
- Constantine College in September 2014
- Location: Heslington East, York
- Established: 2014
- Named for: Constantine the Great
- Senior College Fellow: Andrew Ferguson
- College Manager: Rosie Abbotts
- Deputy College Manager: Naomi Robinson
- Undergraduates: 1,705 (2022/2023)
- Postgraduates: 70 (2022/2023)
- Mascot: Constance the Eagle
- Website: Constantine College
- Student association: CSA

Constantine College is a College of the University of York and was founded in 2014. It was named after the Roman emperor Constantine the Great, who was proclaimed Augustus in York in 306 AD.

Originally the college was owned in equal shares by the Evans Property Group and the university. However, in 2018 the university became the sole owner, purchasing Evans' stake for £9.8 million.

It is the most expensive college, with the cheapest accommodation starting at £166 per week. As of 2021, this made it the least popular of the colleges on East Campus.

== List of Principals ==
The head of college of Constantine is titled the Principal.

- Rob Aitken (2014-2018); first principal
- Jeremy Jacob (2018-2019)
- Andrew Ferguson (2019–present)

== Student life ==
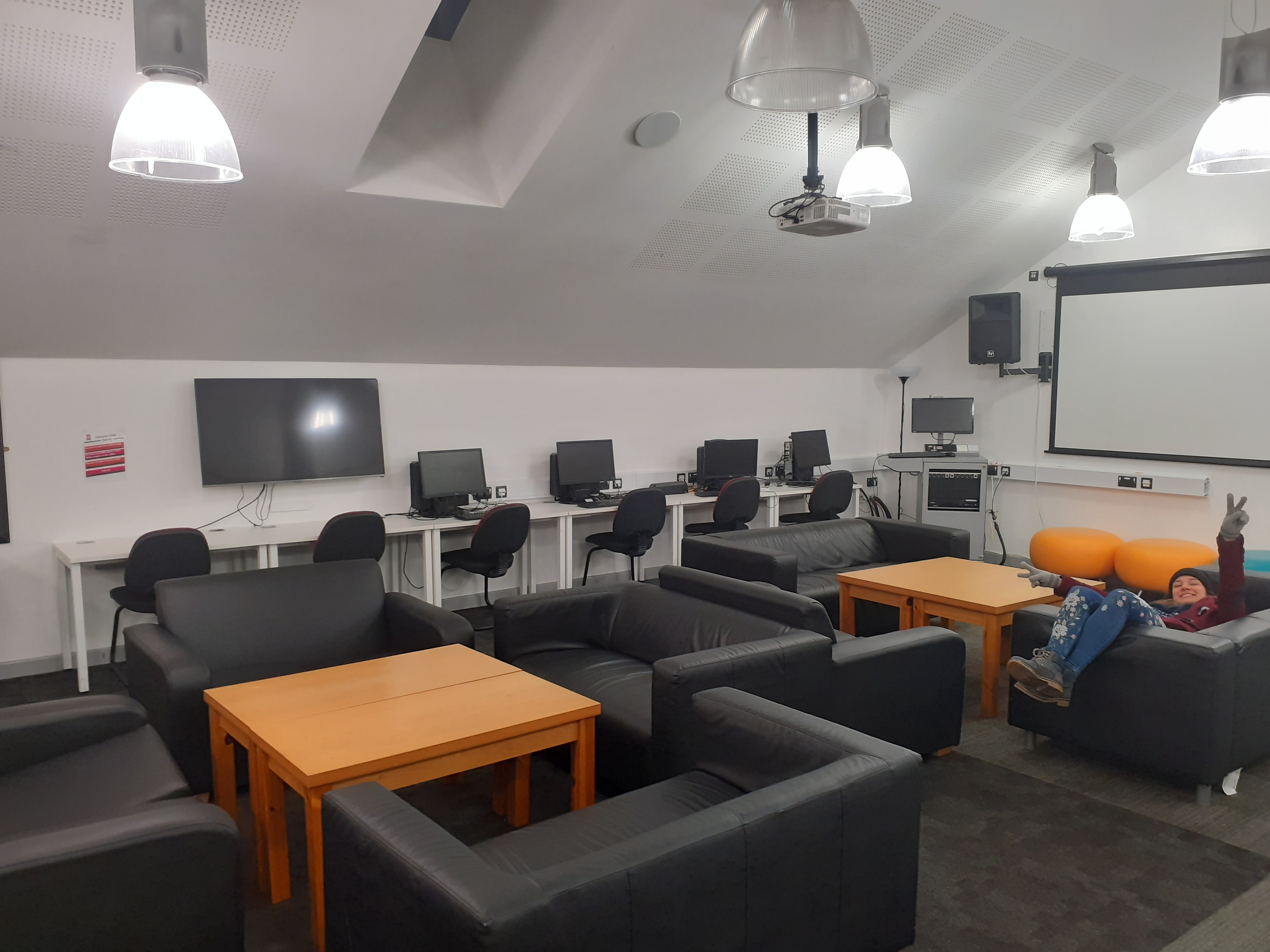
Constantine College junior common room on the first floor of the Forum

Students at Constantine are represented by a College Student Association (CSA).
