= Heslington Brain =

Preserved human brain found in England

- Mass "A" of the Heslington Brain
- Material: Human brain
- Size: (Mass "A") 70 millimetres (2.8 in) × 60 millimetres (2.4 in) × 30 millimetres (1.2 in)
- Created: 673–482 BC
- Discovered: By York Archaeological Trust in August 2008
- Place: Heslington, Yorkshire

The Heslington Brain is a 2,600-year-old human brain found inside a skull buried in a pit in Heslington, Yorkshire, in England, by the York Archaeological Trust in 2008. It is the oldest preserved brain ever found in Eurasia, and is believed to be the best-preserved ancient brain in the world. The skull was discovered during an archaeological dig commissioned by the University of York on the site of its new campus on the outskirts of the city of York. The area was found to have been the site of well-developed permanent habitation between 2,000–3,000 years before the present day.

A number of possibly ritualistic objects were found to have been deposited in several pits, including the skull, which had belonged to a man probably in his 30s. He had been hanged before being decapitated with a knife and his skull appears to have been buried immediately. The rest of the body was missing. Although it is not known why he was killed, it is possible that it may have been a human sacrifice or ritual murder.

The brain was found while the skull was being cleaned. It had survived despite the rest of the tissue on the skull having disappeared long ago. After being extracted at York Hospital, the brain was subjected to a range of medical and forensic examinations by the York Archaeological Trust which found that it was remarkably intact, though it had shrunk to only about 20% of its original size. It showed few signs of decay, though most of its original material had been replaced by an as yet unidentified organic compound, due to chemical changes during burial.

According to the archaeologists and scientists who have examined it, the brain has a "crumbly texture, like very old dried up chocolate". It is not clear why the Heslington brain survived, although the presence of a wet, anoxic environment underground seems to have been an essential factor, and research is still ongoing to shed light on how the local soil conditions may have contributed to its preservation.

== Discovery ==
The site where the brain was discovered is about 3 kilometres (1.9 mi) south-east of York city centre on the eastern edge of Heslington village. It is situated partly on the ridge of an ancient glacial moraine and partly in the basin of the Vale of York. Until the construction of the Heslington East campus of the University of York in 2009, the site was used as agricultural land.

Heslington, England

Survey and excavation work, commissioned by the university, was carried out on the site from 2003. It culminated in a full-scale excavation carried out in 2007–08 by the York Archaeological Trust in an area of just over 8 hectares (20 acres). The archaeologists found that the landscape had been inhabited and farmed for thousands of years. The remains of prehistoric fields, buildings and trackways were discovered, dating from the Bronze Age through to the middle of the Iron Age, with traces of earlier activity as far back as the Mesolithic and Neolithic periods.

During the Iron Age, the area appears to have been the site of a permanent settlement. The excavators found a number of circular features, which they interpreted as the remains of roundhouses. The inhabitants seem to have relocated during the Roman period to a site further up the ridge, leaving the area of the Iron Age settlement to revert to fields.

Around a dozen pits were found on the site and possibly ritualistic objects were found in a number of them. Some pits had been pierced with a single stake, while a number of pits included "burned" cobbles of a local type of stone. The headless body of a red deer had been deposited in a drainage channel and a red deer antler was found in an Iron Age ditch. In one waterlogged pit, a human skull – with the jawbone and the first two vertebrae still attached – was discovered by archaeologist Jim Williams in August 2008, lying face-down at the bottom of the pit. Jim cleaned it up and recorded it but had to leave, so the task of lifting the skull fell to his colleague and friend Rupert Lotherington. The find was seen as unusual but its true importance was not discovered until after it had been transported, within a block of soil, to the Finds Laboratory of the York Archaeological Trust. As Finds officer Rachel Cubitt was cleaning it, she noticed that something was loose inside the skull. She peered through its base and saw that it contained a "yellow substance". She said later that it "jogged my memory of a university lecture on the rare survival of ancient brain tissue ... we gave the skull special conservation treatment as a result and sought expert medical opinion." The skull and its contents were put into cold storage and were examined using a variety of medical and autopsy techniques.

== Analysis ==
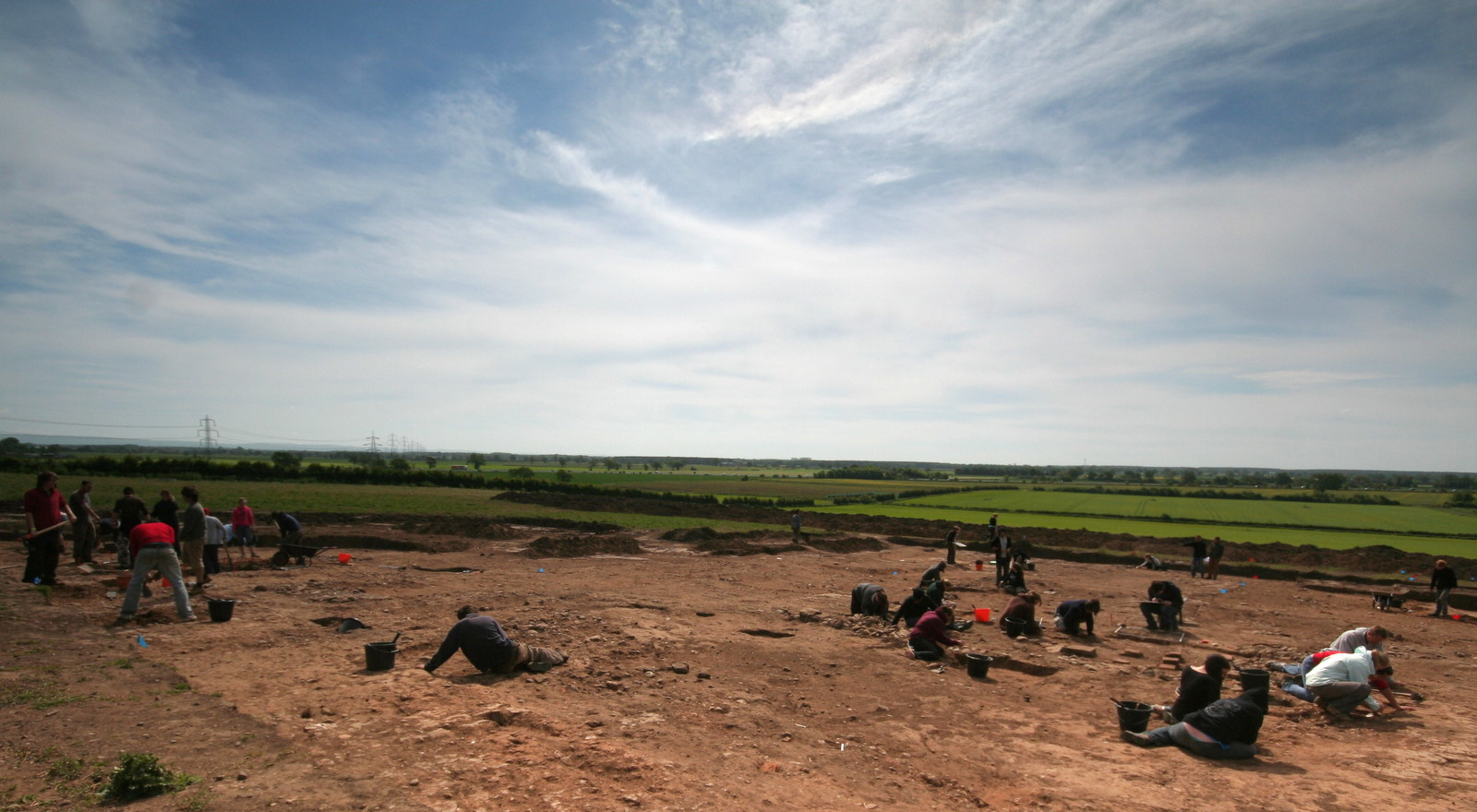
The excavation at Heslington East, May 2008.

The skull was found to be that of a man aged between 26–45 years old at the time of death, likely in his mid-30s. Radiocarbon dating found that the man had died some time between the 7th century BCE and 5th century BCE (673–482 BCE). He belonged to the Mitochondrial DNA haplogroup J1d, which had not previously been seen in Britain, in either living or dead individuals. J1d has been identified previously in only a few people from Tuscany and the Middle East; it may have been more widely present in Britain in the past, and lost through genetic drift.

He had died from traumatic spondylolisthesis – a complete fracture of his spine that is usually associated with death by hanging. Shortly after death his head and upper vertebrae had been severed from his body, almost surgically, using a thin-bladed knife. Although there is evidence from other sites of "trophy heads" in Iron Age societies, it appears that the head was immediately deposited in the pit and buried in fine-grained wet sediment. The reason for the killing is unclear. The archaeological context suggests that the man may have been killed for a ritual or sacrificial purposes.

CT scanning was carried out at York Hospital, where the skull was opened and the contents were removed and forensically examined. The interior of the skull was found to contain several large fragments of brain mixed with sediment. The brain had shrunk to about 20% of its original size, but many anatomical features were still readily identifiable. It was remarkably well-preserved and had few signs of decay other than the presence of a few bacterial spores. One of the fragments clearly showed the neural folds of a cerebral lobe.

Discovery of such a well-preserved brain is all the more remarkable, considering the fragility of all human brains following death. Even when placed in a chilled environment in a mortuary, brains quickly dissolve into liquid. The high fat content of the brain means that it is usually the first major organ to deteriorate. The brains of the crew of the American Civil War submarine H. L. Hunley were recovered along with their skeletonised bodies in 2000, and brains were found in the wreck of the English warship Mary Rose, but archaeologists found that they "liquefied within a matter of minutes" unless preserved immediately in formalin. Brains found in terrestrial environments have tended to be better preserved, as the surviving material tends to have a higher proportion of hydrophobic (water-repellent) matter than in a fresh brain. There appear to be a number of routes by which brains have been preserved, though a common factor appears to be the existence of a wet, anoxic environment. The presence of such an environment is thought to have been responsible for a similar but less complete preservation of brain matter discovered in the 1990s during the construction of a new magistrates' court in Hull.

The preservation of the brain has been attributed to several factors. First, the waterlogged, anoxic soil in which the head was buried, even though only the brain, and not the rest of the tissue, survived burial. Only scanty traces of other tissue remain on the rest of the skull. Second, the brain had undergone unusual chemical changes as a result of being severed and the conditions under which it was buried. In contrast to other brains found, no adipocere – a fatty compound formed through the process of decay – was detected in the Heslington brain, probably because the head was severed from the body before the brain had started to decay. There had also been a major decrease in the amount of proteins and lipids and their replacement by fatty acids and other substances produced as degradation products. Much of the original substance of the brain has been replaced by a high molecular weight, long-chain, hydrocarbon material that is as yet unidentified. According to the archaeologists who have examined it, the brain is "odourless", with a "smooth surface" and a "resilient, tofu-like texture."

Thirdly, the human body tends to decay from the inside out, consumed by a post-mortem swarm of bacteria from the gut which spread around the body via blood from the alimentary tract. In this particular case, the head was severed from the alimentary tract and drained of blood, so the intestinal bacteria did not have an opportunity to contaminate it. The precise mechanism by which the Heslington brain was preserved is unclear, however; in a bid to shed light on this question, researchers buried a number of pigs' heads in and around the campus to see what happened to them.

In a paper published on 8 January 2020 in the Journal of the Royal Society Interface, Axel Petzold et al performed molecular studies on a sample of the brain, and identified over 800 proteins. Some of these proteins were in good enough condition to elicit an immune response. The team also found that the proteins had folded themselves into tightly packed aggregates which are more stable than those found in live brains. This may partly explain how the Heslington brain has been able to stave off decomposition, in addition to the wet, anoxic environment in which the skull was found that could have prevented aerobic microorganisms from surviving.
