= University of York =

University in North Yorkshire, England

Coordinates: 53.947°N 1.052°W

- Latin: Universitas Eboracensis
- Motto: Latin: In limine sapientiae
- Motto in English: On the threshold of wisdom
- Type: Public research university
- Established: 1963; 63 years ago
- Academic affiliations: ACU; EUA; N8 Group; Russell Group; Universities UK; White Rose Consortium; WUN; Defence Universities Alliance
- Endowment: £8.29 million (2025)
- Budget: £538.6 million (2024/25)
- Chancellor: Heather Melville
- Vice-Chancellor: Charlie Jeffery
- Academic staff: 2,540 (2024/25)
- Students: 22,345 (2024/25); 20,360 FTE (2024/25)
- Undergraduates: 16,015 (2024/25)
- Postgraduates: 6,330 (2024/25)
- Location: Heslington, York, England
- Campus: Heslington West, Heslington East, and King's Manor
- Colours: Dark blue and dark green
- Website: york.ac.uk

The University of York (abbreviated as Ebor or York for post-nominals) is a collegiate public research university in York, England. Established in 1963, the university has expanded to more than thirty departments and centres, covering a wide range of subjects.

South-east of the city of York, the university campus is about 500 acres (200 hectares) in size. The original campus, Campus West, incorporates the York Science Park and the National Science Learning Centre, and its wildlife, campus lakes and greenery are prominent. In May 2007 the university was granted permission to build an extension to its main campus, on arable land just east of the nearby village of Heslington. The second campus, Campus East, opened in 2009 and now hosts five colleges and three departments as well as conference spaces, a sports village and a business start-up 'incubator'. Between 1963 and 2026 the institution also leased King's Manor in York city centre, now part of York St John University. The university had a total income of £538.6 million in 2024–25 of which £107.1 million was from research grants and contracts, with an expenditure of £525.1 million.

York was one of the first of the plate glass universities established in the 1960s, and runs a distinctive collegiate system, which currently consists of eleven colleges. The eleventh college, David Kato, opened in 2022. The university is a member of regional research groups including the N8 Group and White Rose University Consortium as well as the national Russell Group.

== History ==
=== Origins ===
The first petition for the establishment of a university in York was presented to James I in 1617. In 1641, a second petition was drawn up but was not delivered due to the English Civil War in 1642. A third petition was created in 1647 but was rejected by Parliament. In the 1820s there were discussions about the founding of a university in York, but this did not come to fruition owing to the founding of Durham University in 1832. In 1903, F. J. Munby and the Yorkshire Philosophical Society, among others, proposed a "Victoria University of Yorkshire".

Oliver Sheldon a director of Rowntree's and co-founder of York Civic Trust, was a driving force behind the campaign to found the university.

=== Establishment ===
John Bowes Morrell was the driving force behind the university's establishment. York accepted its first students the year of Morrell's death, 1963, opening with 216 undergraduates, 14 postgraduates, and 28 academic and administrative staff. The university started with six departments: Economics, Education, English, History, Mathematics, Politics. At the time, the university consisted of three buildings, principally the historic King's Manor in the city centre and Heslington Hall, which has Tudor foundations and is in the village of Heslington on the edge of York. A year later, work began on purpose-built structures on the Heslington Campus, which now forms the main part of the university.

Baron James of Rusholme, the university's first Vice-Chancellor, said of the University of York that "it must be collegiate in character, that it must deliberately seek to limit the number of subjects and that much of the teaching must be done via tutorials and seminars". Due to the influence of Graeme Moodie, founding head of the Politics Department, students are involved in the governance of the university at all levels, and his model has since been widely adopted.

York's first two colleges, Derwent and Langwith, were founded in 1965, as was the University of York Library. These were the first residential colleges. They were followed by Alcuin and Vanbrugh in 1967 and Goodricke in 1968. In 1972 this was followed by Wentworth College.

The university was noted for its inventive approach to teaching. It was known for its early adoption of joint honours degrees, which were often very broad, such as history and biology. It also took an innovative approach to social science introducing a five-year-long degree in the subject.

=== Expansion ===
After 1972, the construction of colleges ceased until 1990 with the foundation of James College. Initially James was intended to be a postgraduate only college. However, the university began to expand rapidly, almost doubling in size from 4,300 to 8,500 students. In 1993, therefore it was decided that the college should become open to undergraduates. The expansion of student numbers also resulted in the creation of more accommodation by the university, which was named 'Halifax Court'; the members of Halifax Court were members of other colleges, however, soon formed their own Junior Common Room. In 2002, Halifax Court was made a full college of the university and was renamed Halifax College.

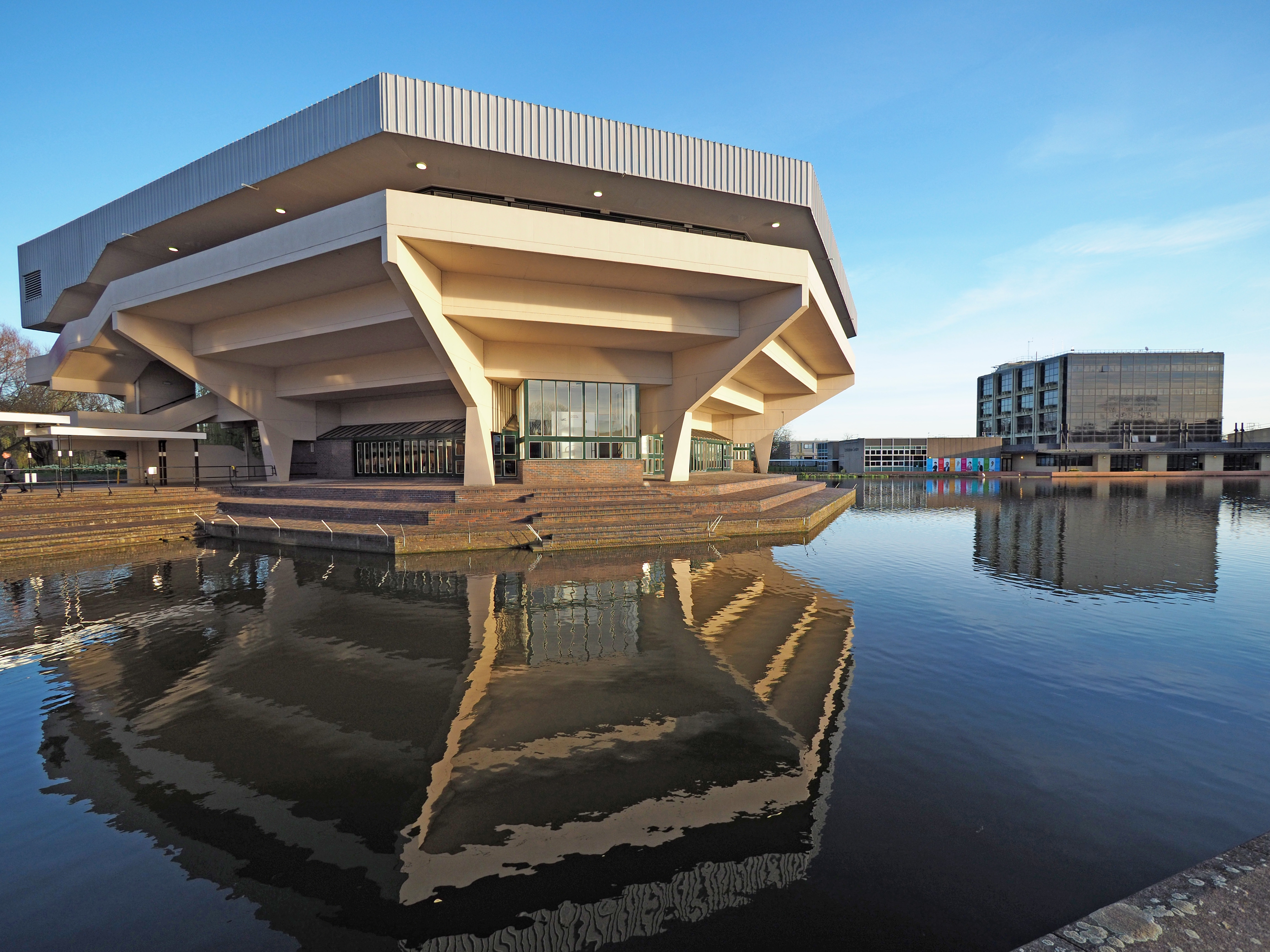
Central Hall and the lake

In 2003, the university set out plans to create a campus for 5,000 additional students, and to introduce a number of new subjects such as law and dentistry. For a number of years, the university's expansion plans were limited by planning restrictions. The City of York planning conditions stipulate that only 20% of the land area may be built upon, and the original campus was at full capacity.

In 2004, plans were finalised for a 117 hectare extension to the campus, initially called Heslington East, designed to mirror the existing Heslington West campus. They are now known as Campus East and Campus West. The plans set out that the new campus would be built on arable land between Grimston Bar park and ride car park and Heslington village. The land was removed from the green belt especially for the purpose of extending the university. After a lengthy consultation and a public inquiry into the proposals in 2006, Secretary of State for Communities and Local Government Ruth Kelly gave the go-ahead in May 2007.

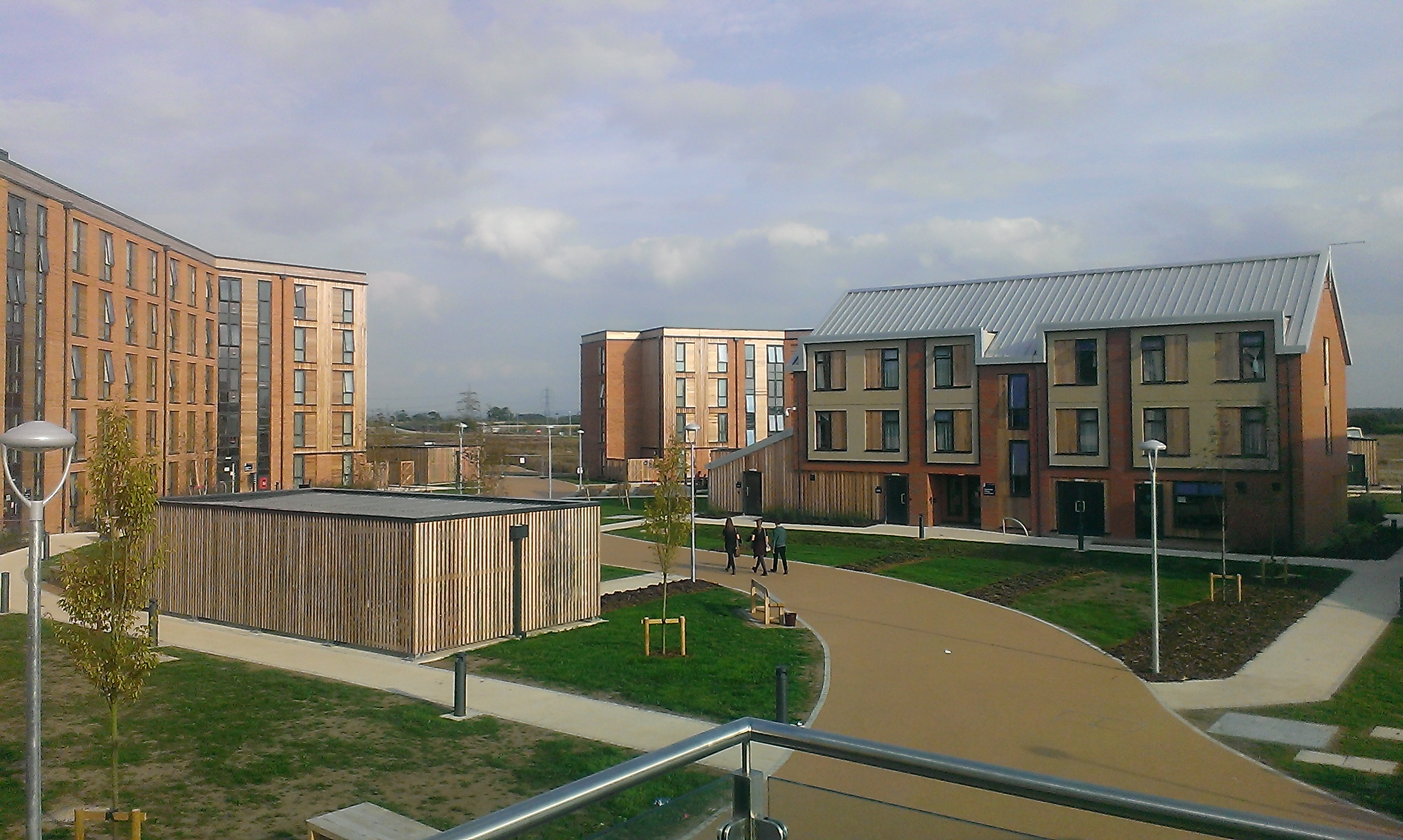
Constantine College was founded in 2014.

In May 2008 the City of York planners approved the design for the residential college, Goodricke. In The Press on 28 July 2008, Shepherd Construction was named as the preferred contractor for the Goodricke College buildings. The proposal included landscaping the whole area, constructing a lake with marsh borders, planting light woodland and many specimen trees, and maximising biodiversity.

Construction began in 2008, with the first buildings, including Goodricke college, coming into use in October 2009. It was decided that rather than create a new college that an existing college should be moved. Goodricke College was selected for this and moved onto the new campus in 2009 with James taking over its building on Campus West. Goodricke was officially opened by the then Duke of York (later Andrew Mountbatten-Windsor) in April 2010. In 2012, the same process took place with Langwith moving to Campus East and Derwent taking over its previous buildings. In 2014 Campus East saw the establishment of the ninth college, named Constantine College after the Roman emperor Constantine the Great, who was proclaimed Augustus in York in 306 AD.

Work began in December 2019 to build two new colleges on Campus East. These will comprise around 1,400 new student bedrooms as well as new social spaces. The university says that "development has been designed to optimise the beautiful landscape and will be built with respect for the existing ecological diversity around the lake".

== Campus ==
=== Campus West ===
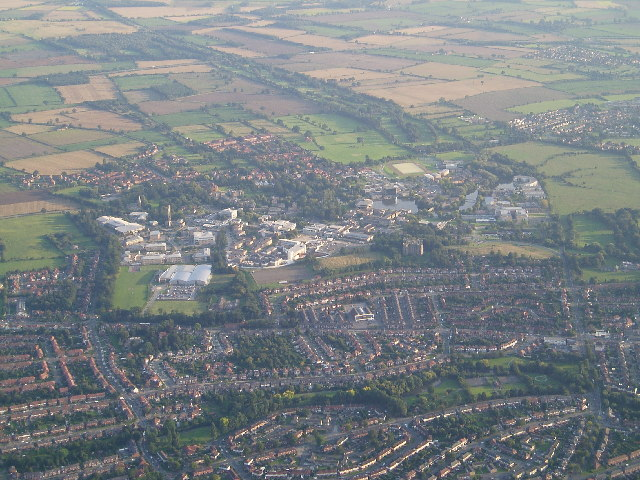
The campus from the air looking south in September 2005

In 1964, work began on the campus facilities in the grounds of Heslington Hall. The marshy land was drained, the winding lake that dominates the campus was built, and the area was landscaped. The original buildings were designed by architects Sir Andrew Derbyshire and Sir Stirrat Johnson-Marshall, with input also from the Vice-Chancellor Lord James, Professor Patrick Nuttgens and the Registrar, John West-Taylor. The new structures were assembled using the CLASP system of prefabricated construction, hence York's inclusion among the so-called plate glass universities. The buildings are connected by numerous covered walkways and bridges. Most of the university's arts departments occupy premises in the college buildings, while many of the science departments have their own buildings.

==== Central Hall ====
A landmark building is Central Hall, a half-octagonal concert hall used for convocations and examinations, as well as theatrical and musical performances. It is a Grade II-listed building, as is the West campus landscape. It has played host to the Wailers, George Melly, Soft Machine, Pink Floyd, and Paul McCartney. Performances by big-name acts have been rarer at the university following a 1985 the Boomtown Rats concert, during which the cover of the orchestra pit was damaged. A ban on pop performances, and in particular dancing, in Central Hall was imposed by the university, although it has occasionally been relaxed. Central Hall is still used for classical concerts and since a rock concert was held there on 13 March 2010 it has been available again for full booking. Public concerts are regularly held in the music department's Sir Jack Lyons Concert Hall, the Arthur Sykes Rymer Auditorium and in some of the colleges.

==== University library ====
The University of York Library opened in 1965 two years after the university itself opened. The building was designed by Robert Mathews, Johnson-Marshall and partners. The primary site of library comprises a series of three linked buildings to the north side of the University of York's West Campus: the JB Morrell, the Raymond Burton, and the Fairhurst buildings. Originally just consisting of the JB Morrell, in 2003 the Raymond Burton library was added to the site, designed by Leach Rhodes Walker architects and houses both the Humanities research reading room and the Borthwick institute for archives. The Raymond Burton Library was also recently nominated for a SCONUL Design award. In 2012 the Library had a £20 million renovation incorporating the neighbouring Fairhurst building, now housing the majority of libraries study spaces including the postgraduate study lounge.

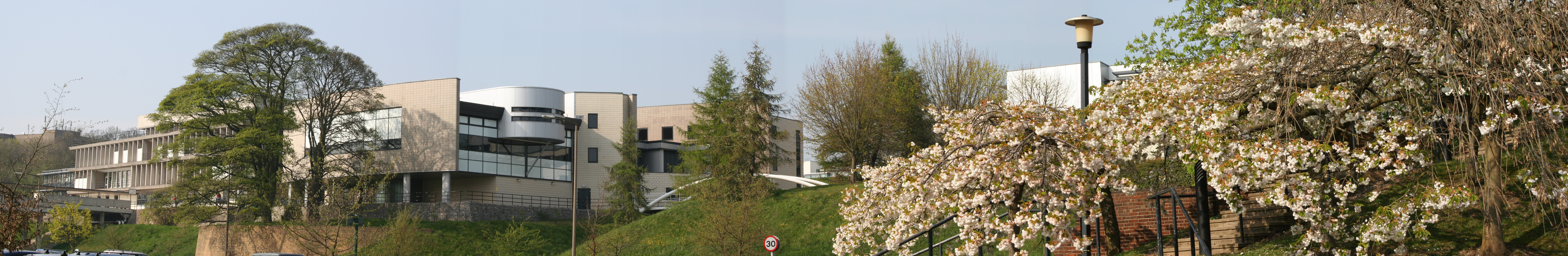
The JB Morrell and Raymond Burton library buildings

==== Grounds ====
The campus lake is the largest plastic-bottomed lake in Europe. The decision by Sir Andrew Derbyshire and Stirrat Johnson-Marshall to give the university a lake had two motivations: one, to give the university a distinct image and identity while also creating areas to foster community; and two, more practically to create a drainage basin for the relatively flat agricultural site as it was feared the construction of the new buildings would increase the risk of flooding. The lake has attracted a large population of wild and semi-wild waterfowl, including greylag, Canada, barnacle and snow geese, coots, moorhens and large numbers of ducks, including mallards, tufted ducks, and common pochards. There is also a growing population of black swans and a few great crested grebe. Grey herons have also been sighted on the lake. The southern end of the lake has been established as a bird sanctuary. Fishing is permitted in season, on purchase of a licence. On occasions the lake has been called Scullion's Lake. However, the use of this name varies, which challenges its authenticity. It has been applied to the whole lake, to the Derwent fish pond, and to the end of the lake around Wentworth. No historic use of the term has been found to add support to any of these terms use.

Other parts of the campus support a large rabbit population. On at least one occasion, students have been cautioned by the university for hunting rabbits.

Campus West has both indoor and outdoor sports facilities, including an all-weather AstroTurf pitch and County standard cricket pitch. A large, tent-like structure allows for indoor sport, gymnastics and dance.

In 2013 it was reported that the university was planning a major redevelopment of Campus West, which would also result in the creation of a tenth college.

==== Heslington Hall ====
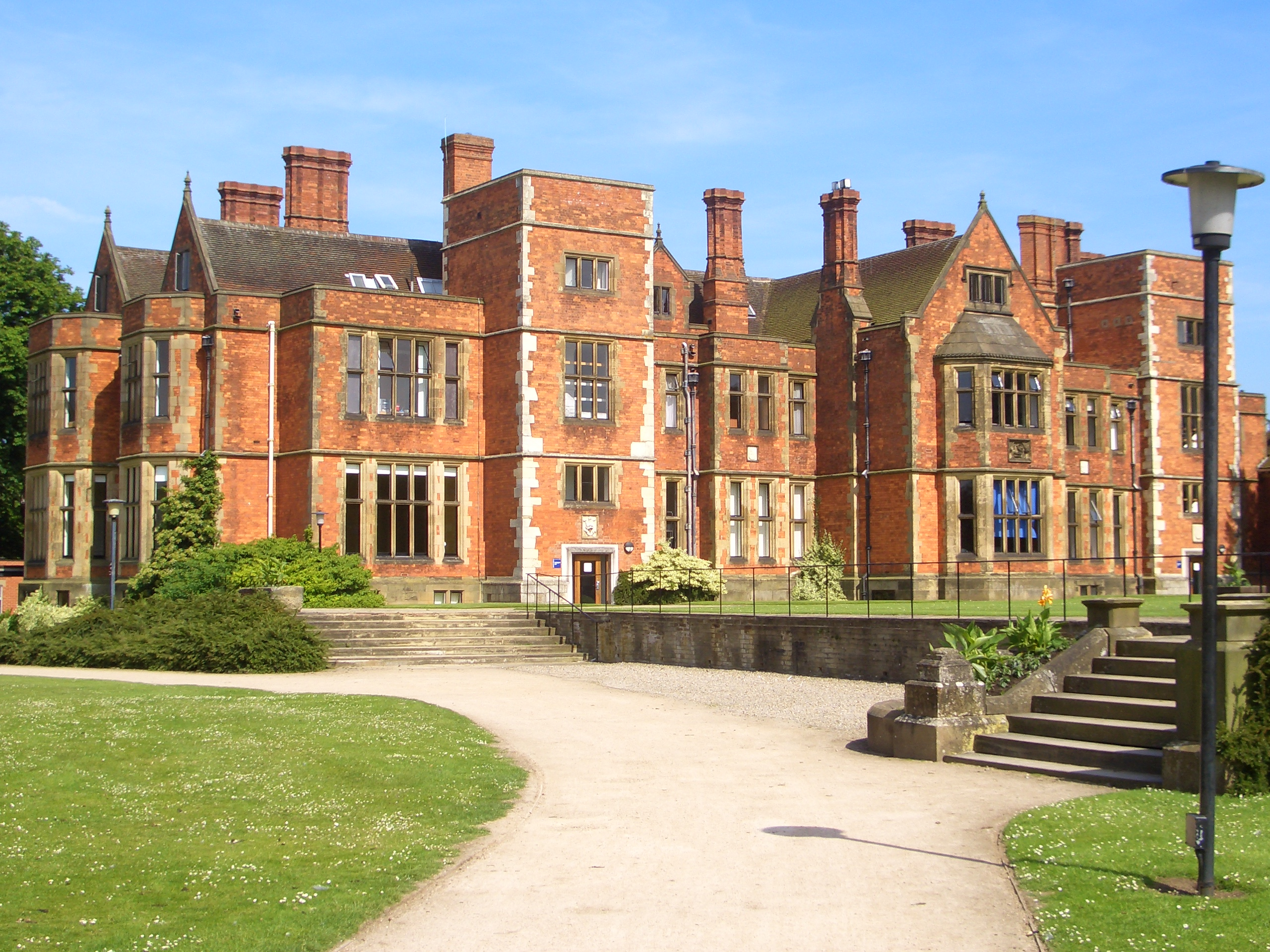
Heslington Hall was built in 1568

Heslington Hall is a Grade II* listed rebuilt manor house consisting of a central nine-bay two-storey block with attics and two two-storey wings at each end. It is built of brick in English bond with sandstone ashlar dressings. The original Manor house was constructed in 1568 for Sir Thomas Eynns, the Secretary and Keeper of the Seal to the Council of the North; and his wife Elizabeth.

At the outbreak of the Second World War, the house was vacated by the family, allowing it to be taken over by the Royal Air Force as the headquarters of No. 4 Group RAF, part of RAF Bomber Command. The hall was not re-occupied by the family after the war. In 1955 the hall was given Grade II* listed building status. When the university was founded, Sir Bernard Feilden supervised its conversion into the administrative headquarters of the university. The hall and University were at that time in the East Riding of Yorkshire although they are now part of the City of York.

==== Science Park and on-campus organisations ====
Next door to the university on the York Science Park are organisations including the Higher Education Academy, the Digital Preservation Coalition, the National Non-Food Crops Centre, the York Neuroimaging Centre, the York JEOL Nanocentre, the IT office of VetUK, the UK head office of AlphaGraphics, the accelerated mass spectrometry specialists Xceleron Ltd, and the Leeds, York & North Yorkshire Chamber of Commerce. The Science Park is also home to some parts of the School of Physics, Engineering and Technology. The Department of Electronic Engineering's Recording studios are located in the park and in summer 2011, the Department of Physics moved its Plasma Physics and Fusion Group to the Genesis buildings in the Science Park at the newly created York Plasma Institute, and moved its Physics of Life group to the Science Park in winter 2019. York Conferences are located on the university campus.

=== King's Manor ===
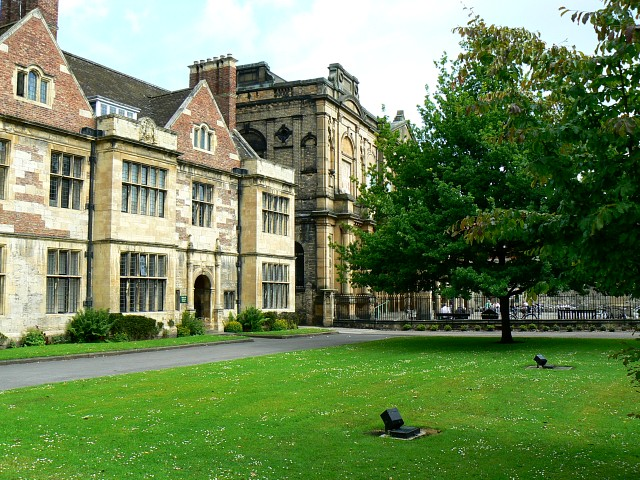
King's Manor

Located in York city centre, about 2 miles (3 km) from the main Heslington West campus, the historic King's Manor began as the Abbot's House of St Mary's Abbey and went on to become the headquarters of the Council of the North following the dissolution of the monasteries. For many years after 1966, the King's Manor housed the Institute of Advanced Architectural Studies (IoAAS). The IoAAS was a postgraduate institute primarily specialising in providing mid-career education for architects and others. In particular, it became well known for its one-year Diploma Course in Conservation Studies.

The university announced in 2024 that it would stop using King's Manor for teaching and research due to the cost of maintaining the property and problems with accessibility, with the departments moving to the main Heslington campus. The research centres in humanities, medieval studies, renaissance and early modern studies, and eighteenth century studies, moved to Heslington Hall in 2025, while the Department of Archaeology is planned to move to the Berrick Saul Building in summer 2026. The lease for the site, owned by City of York Council, will be taken over by York St John University in 2026.

=== Campus East ===
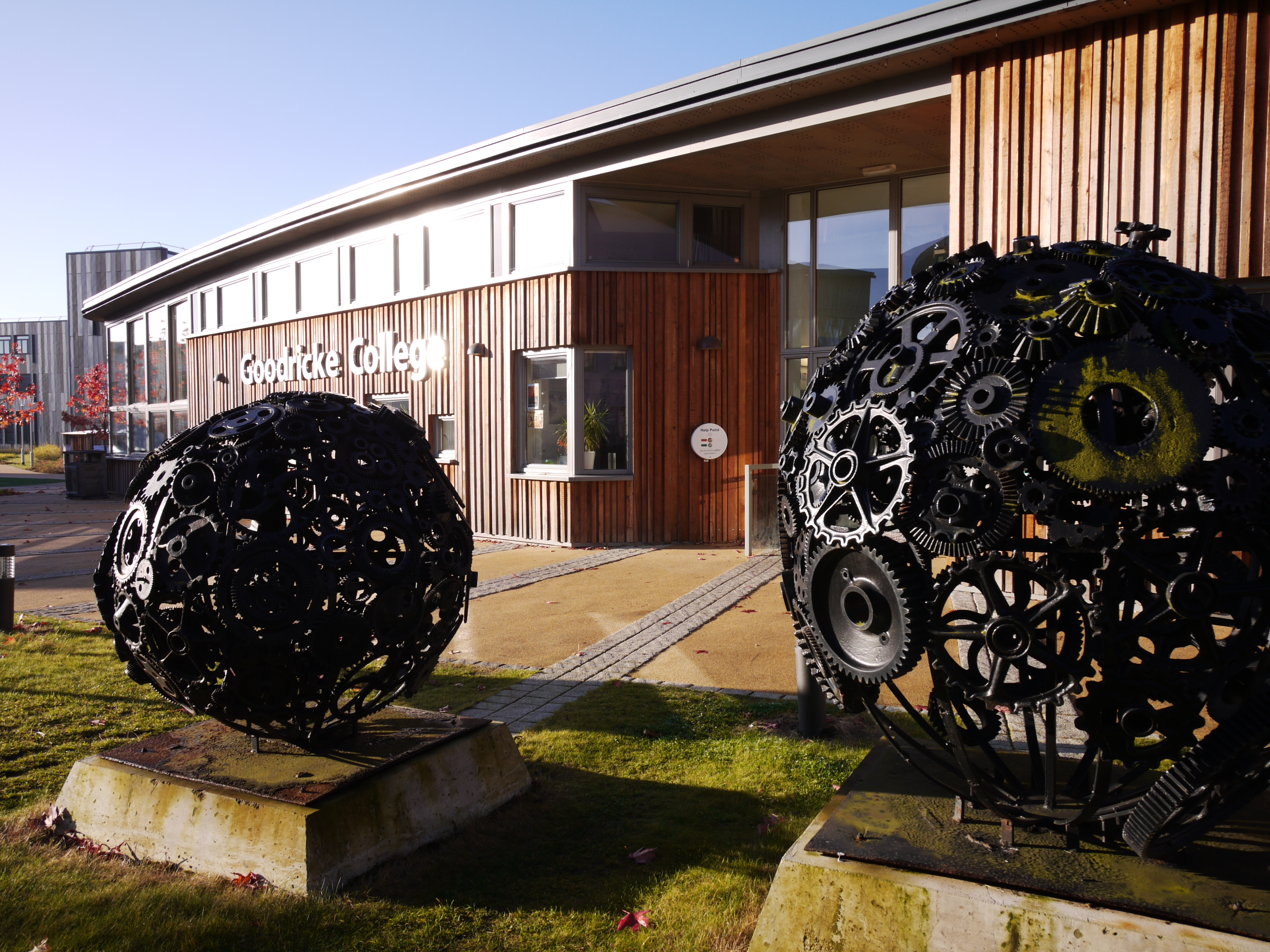
Goodricke College, Heslington East campus

Several departments have purpose-built facilities on Campus East, including York Law School. In October 2010, several departments moved into new facilities on Campus East including the Department of Theatre, Film and Television and the Department of Computer Science.

Campus East also includes the York Sports Village and a new purpose built £1.1 million Olympic-sized outdoor velodrome, the only one in Yorkshire or the North East of England.

=== Other properties ===
The university owns several other properties including Catherine House, Constantine House, 54 Walmgate, and Fairfax House. The university publishes an annual code of practice for student accommodation to help students living off-campus.

== Organisation and administration ==
=== Colleges ===
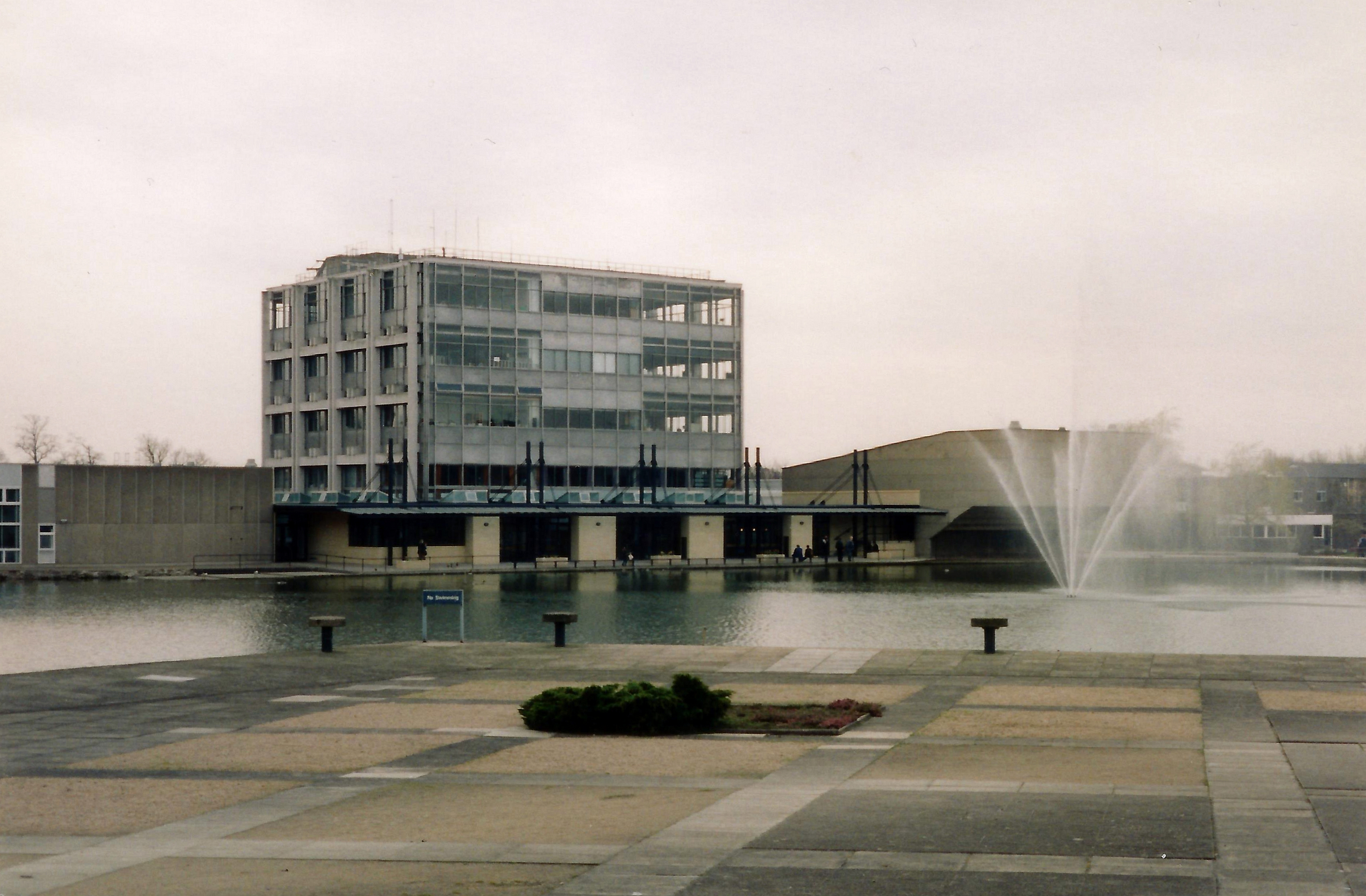
Physics Block, University of York.

York is a collegiate university and has eleven colleges. All colleges have equal status, and each has its own constitution. Each college is governed by its own College Council, which contains a combination of university staff and elected student members and is chaired by a Senior College Fellow. The day-to-day running of the colleges is managed by administrative staff from the university's Student Life and Wellbeing unit, with all the colleges coordinated by an administrative Senior Colleges Manager. In 2023, the university substituted the academic role of College Principal for the unrenumerated post of Senior College Fellow. Most colleges have a Junior Common Room for undergraduate students, which is managed by the elected Junior Common Room Committee. Some colleges retain a Graduate Common Room for postgraduate students, as well as a Senior Common Room, which is managed by elected representatives of the college's academic and administrative members. Other colleges however combine undergraduate and postgraduate representation together into student associations. The colleges are deliberately assigned undergraduates, postgraduate students and staff from a wide mixture of disciplines. The Sunday Times noted, "The colleges are tight-knit communities within the university and enjoy a healthy rivalry." The colleges share practical features of the halls of residence of other UK universities, as well as the traditional Oxbridge and Durham colleges. In recent years, the university has built three new colleges on Campus East. The ninth college was founded in 2014 and was named Constantine after the Roman emperor Constantine I, who was proclaimed Augustus in York in 306 AD. The tenth was founded in 2021 and named after Anne Lister. The eleventh was founded in 2022 and named after David Kato.

Name	Foundation	Named after
Derwent College	1965	River Derwent
Langwith College	1965 (Note: Langwith moved to the Campus East in 2012)	Langwith Common
Alcuin College	1967	Alcuin of York, scholar and advisor to Charlemagne
Vanbrugh College	1967	Sir John Vanbrugh, designer of Castle Howard
Goodricke College	1968 (Note: Goodricke moved to the Campus East in 2009)	John Goodricke, astronomer
Wentworth College	1972 (Note: Wentworth was refounded in 2001 and became a postgraduate only college.)	Thomas Wentworth, 1st Earl of Strafford
James College	1990 (Note: James College was originally postgraduate only, but changed to accept undergraduates in 1993.)	Lord James of Rusholme
Halifax College	2002 (Note: Halifax College was originally Halifax Court, but received college status in 2002.)	Edward Wood, 1st Earl of Halifax
Constantine College	2014	Emperor Constantine the Great
Anne Lister College	2021	Anne Lister, Yorkshire landowner and diarist
David Kato College	2022	David Kato, Ugandan human rights defender

Halifax College

=== Academic departments ===
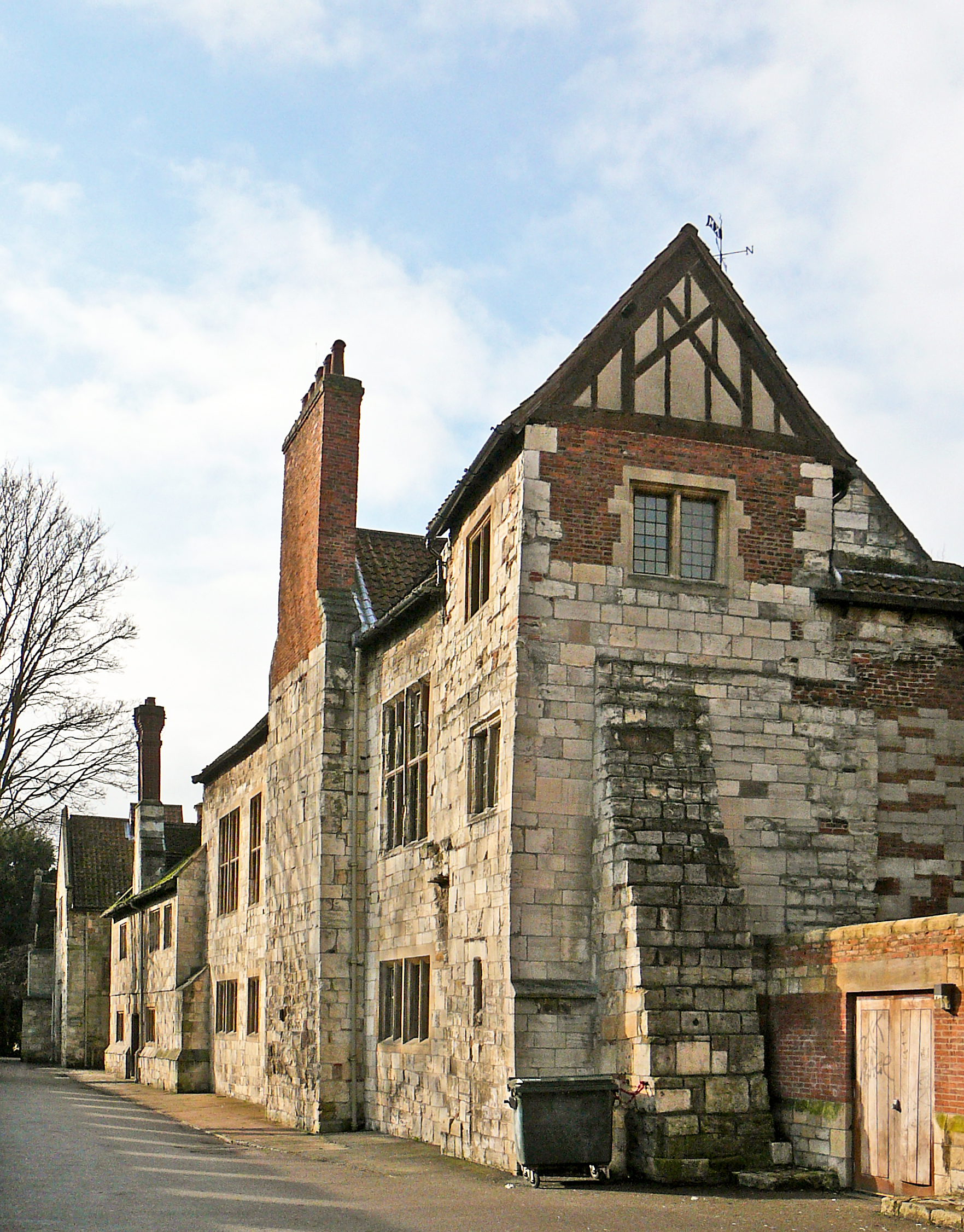
The Archeology Department of the University of York

The university hosts a number of interdisciplinary research centres, including the Borthwick Institute for Archives, Centre for Renaissance and Early Modern Studies, the Centre for Eighteenth-Century Studies, the Centre for Modern Studies, the Centre for Medieval Studies, the Institute for Effective Education and the Institute for the Public Understanding of the Past. The Department of Politics hosts the Post-war Reconstruction and Development Unit and the Centre for Applied Human Rights.

Campus West hosts the National Science Learning Centre which opened in March 2006, it serves as the hub for a £51 million national network of centres dedicated to revitalising science teaching in schools. It is operated by the White Rose University Consortium (which comprises the Universities of Leeds, Sheffield and York) together with Sheffield Hallam University.

- Department of Archaeology
- Department of Architecture and the Built Environment (opening September 2025)
- Department of Biology
- Department of Chemistry
- Department of Computer Science
- Department of Economics and Related Studies
- Department of Education
- School of Physics, Engineering and Technology
- Department of English and Related Literature
- Department of Environment and Geography
- Centre for Health Economics
- Department of Health Sciences
- Department of History
- Department of History of Art
- Department of Language and Linguistic Science
- York Law School
- School for Business and Society
- Department of Mathematics
- Hull York Medical School
- School of Arts and Creative Technologies
- School of Natural Sciences
- Department of Philosophy
- School of Philosophy, Politics and Economics
- Department of Politics and International Relations
- Department of Psychology
- Institute of Railway Studies
- School for Business and Society
- Department of Sociology
- School of Arts and Creative Technologies

=== Governance ===
==== List of chancellors ====
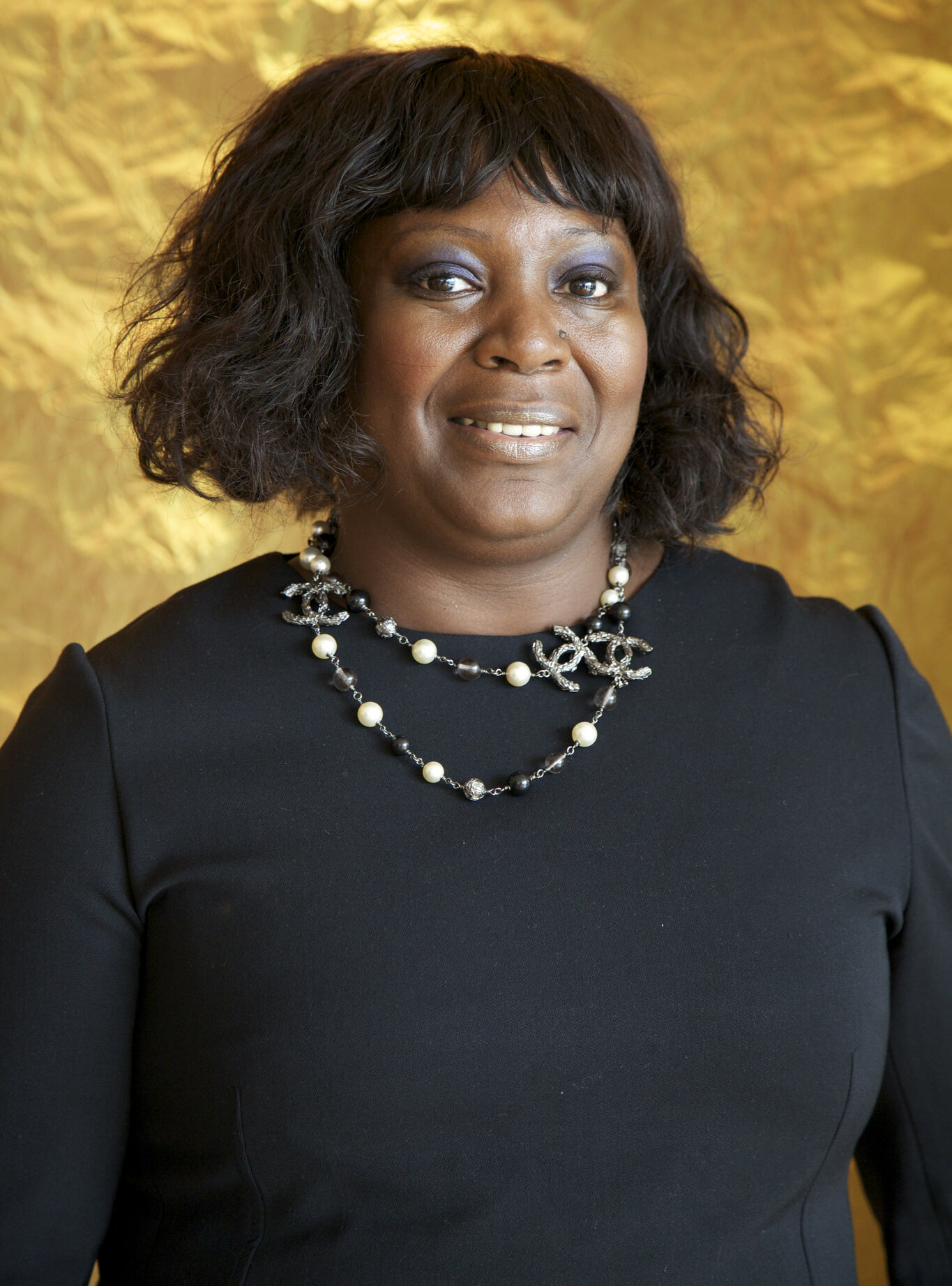
Heather Melville, the incumbent Chancellor (2022)

- George Lascelles, 7th Earl of Harewood (1962–1967)
- Kenneth Clark, Baron Clark (1967–1978)
- Michael Swann, Baron Swann (1979–1990)
- Dame Janet Baker (1991–2004)
- Greg Dyke (2004–2015)
- Sir Malcolm Grant (2015–2022)
- Heather Melville, (2022–)

==== List of vice-chancellors ====
- Eric James, Baron James of Rusholme (1962–1973)
- Morris Carstairs (1973–1978)
- Berrick Saul (1979–1993)
- Ron Cooke (1993–2002)
- Brian Cantor (2002–2013)
- Jane Grenville, acting (2013)
- Koen Lamberts (2014–2018)
- Saul Tendler, acting (2018–2019)
- Charlie Jeffery (2019–present)

==== List of pro-vice-chancellors ====
- Matthias Ruth (2019–2025)
  - Pro-vice-chancellor of research
- Kiran Trehan (2019–present)
  - Pro-vice-chancellor of partnerships and engagement
- Ambrose Field (2019–present)
  - Pro-vice-chancellor of global strategy
- Tracy Lightfoot (2019–present)
  - Pro-vice-chancellor of teaching, learning, and students

=== Finances ===
In the financial year ending 31 July 2024, the University of York had a total income of £515.5 million (2022/23 – £496.6 million) and total expenditure of £379.4 million (2022/23 – £496.6 million). Key sources of income included £260.1 million from tuition fees and education contracts (2022/23 – £256.3 million), £54.8 million from funding body grants (2022/23 – £59.4 million), £100.4 million from research grants and contracts (2022/23 – £96.8 million), £10.1 million from investment income (2022/23 – £7.1 million) and £4.1 million from donations and endowments (2022/23 – £3.2 million).

At year end, York had endowments of £7.85 million (2023 – £7.42 million) and total net assets of £472.7 million (2023 – £344.2 million).

=== University of York Music Press ===
University of York Music Press (UYMP) was founded in 1995 by David Blake with Bill Colleran. UYMP maintains online catalogues for composers and their music. At present, there are a total of twenty-seven house composers and thirty-one associate composers. UYMP has so far published more than one thousand projects in twelve sections. Among the composers whose music is published by UYMP are David Blake and Anthony Gilbert.

== Academic profile ==
=== Reputation and rankings ===
Rankings
National rankings
- Complete (2027): 20
- Guardian (2027): 46
- Times / Sunday Times (2027): 18

Global rankings
- ARWU (2026): 301–400
- QS (2027): 158=
- THE (2026): 154=

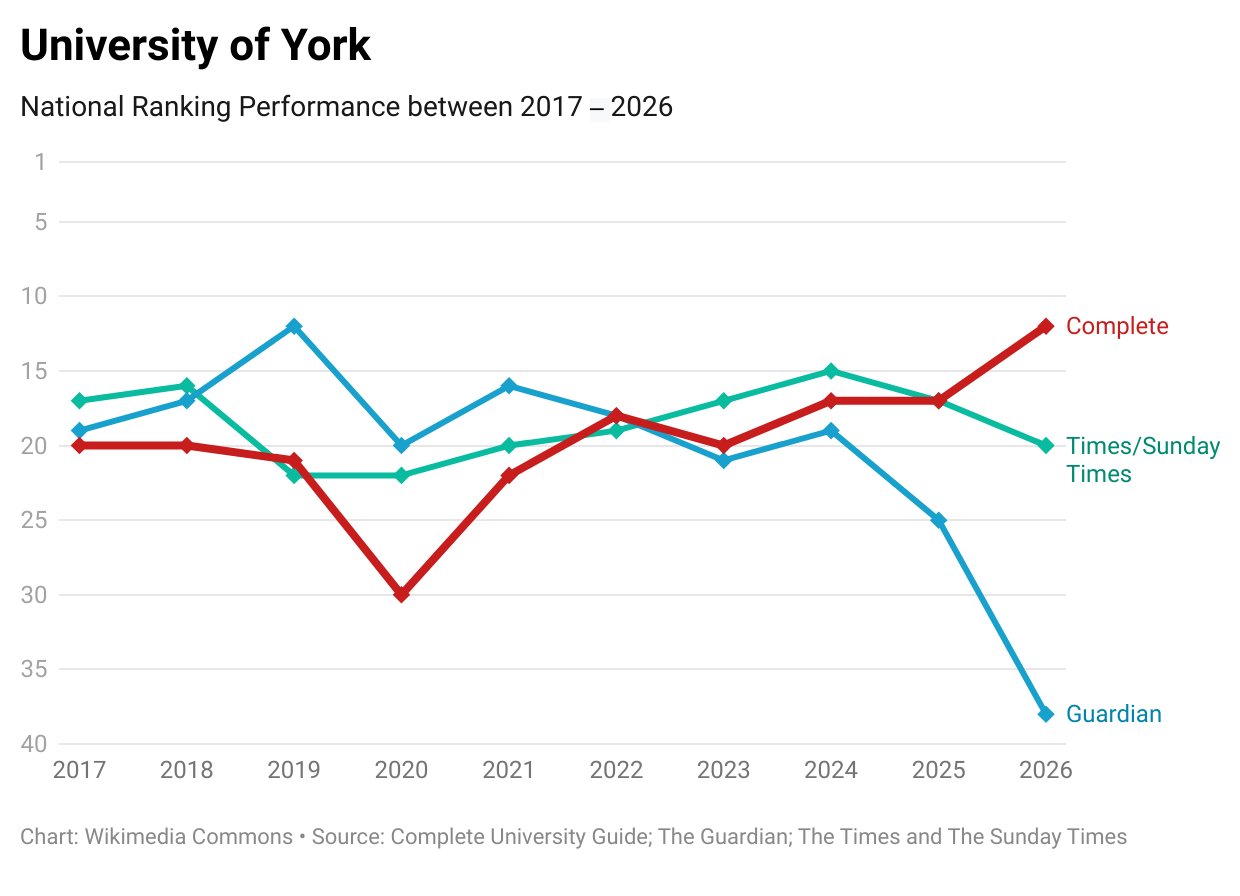
University of York's national league table performance over the past ten years

In 2010, York was named "University of the Year" by Times Higher Education for its "success in combining academic excellence with social inclusion, as well as its record in scientific discovery".

In national university rankings for 2026, the University of York was ranked 12th by the Complete University Guide, 38th by the Guardian University Guide and 20th by the Times and Sunday Times Good University Guide.

In global rankings, York was ranked in the 201–300 range in the Shanghai Ranking Consultancy Academic Ranking of World Universities, 169th in the Quacquarelli Symonds QS World University Ranking and joint 154th in the Times Higher Education World University Ranking.

Historically, York was ranked 6th in the UK in The Sunday Times 10-year (1998–2007) average ranking of British universities based on their performance in the Sunday Times league tables. In a 2000 analysis of league tables published by The Times, Daily Telegraph, Sunday Times and Financial Times, the Sutton Trust also placed York 6th. The University of York reached its best ever position of 70th in the QS World University Rankings in 2009.

=== Admissions ===
UCAS Admission Statistics
	2025	2024	2023	2022	2021
Applications (Note: Main scheme applications, International and UK)	31,470	32,650	30,240	30,180	27,625
Accepted	6,900	5,505	5,185	4,955	5,295
Applications/Accepted Ratio	4.6	5.9	5.8	6.1	5.2
Overall Offer Rate (%)	86.8	80.1	78.5	79.1	83.5
↳ UK only (%) (Note: UK domiciled applicants)	87.2	79.3	78.9	78.7	83.6
Average Entry Tariff	—N/a	—N/a	142	158	157
↳ Top three exams (Note: The maximum tariff score for three exams is 168: the equivalent of A*A*A* at A-Level, 777 at HL for the IB Diploma Programme, or AAA at Advanced Higher)	—N/a	—N/a	142.5	150.5	149.3

HESA Student Body Composition (2024/25)
Domicile and Ethnicity	Total
British White (Note: Not be confused solely with White British)	65%
British Ethnic Minorities (Note: Includes those who indicate that they identify as Asian, Black, Mixed Heritage, Arab or any other ethnicity except White.)	16%
International EU	2%
International Non-EU	17%
Undergraduate Widening Participation Indicators
Female	58%
Independent School	12%
Low Participation Areas (Note: Calculated from the Polar4 measure, using Quintile1, in England and Wales. Calculated from the Scottish Index of Multiple Deprivation (SIMD) measure, using SIMD20, in Scotland.)	10%

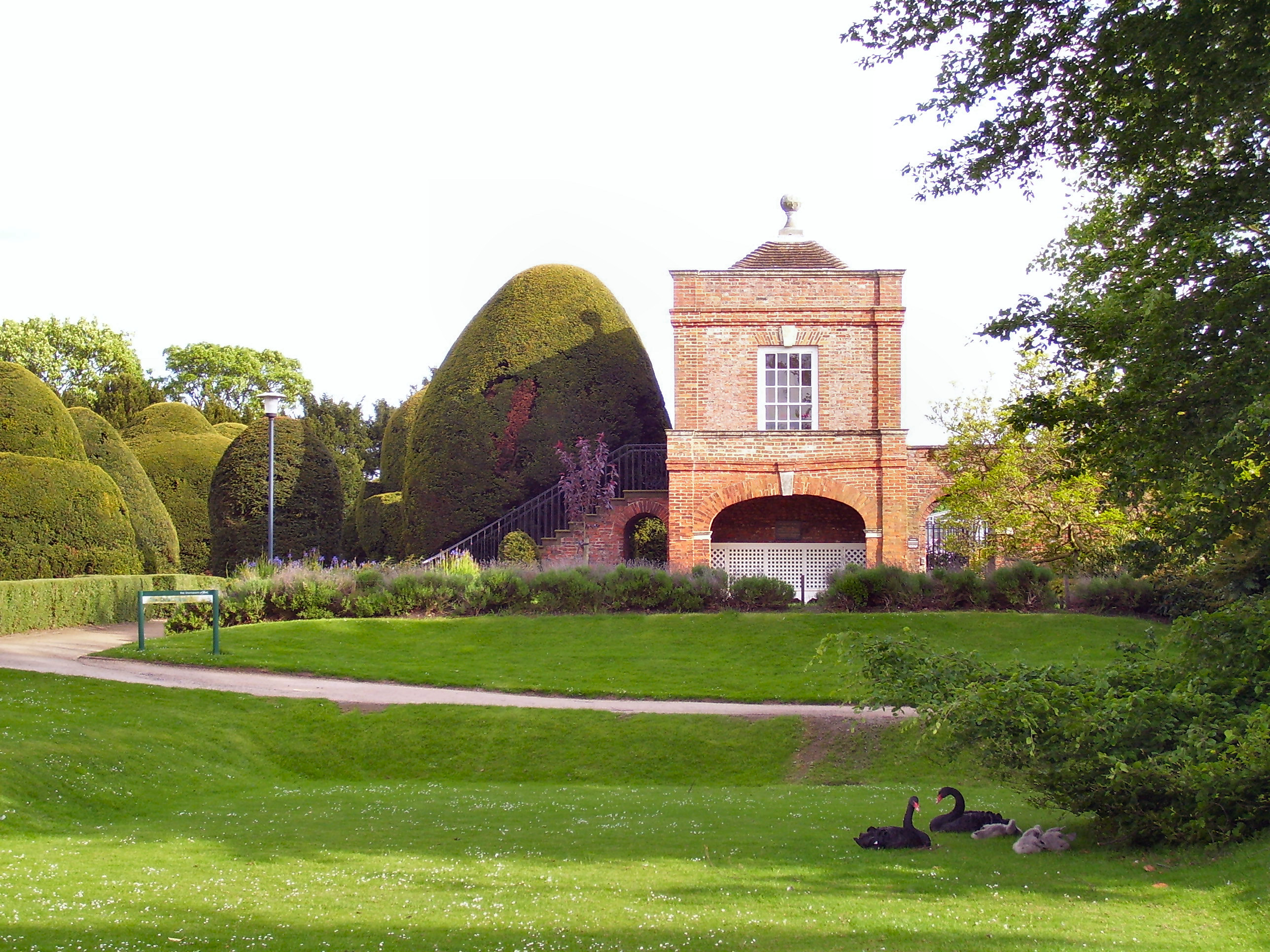
The Quiet Place by Heslington Hall

In the 2024/25 academic year, the student body consisted of 22,345 students, composed of 16,015 undergraduates and 6,330 postgraduate students. The university is consistently designated as a 'high-tariff' institution by the Department for Education, with the average undergraduate entrant to the university in recent years amassing between 142–151 UCAS Tariff points in their top three pre-university qualifications – the equivalent of AAB to A*AA at A-Level. Based on 2022/23 HESA entry standards data published in domestic league tables, which include a broad range of qualifications beyond the top three exam grades, the average student at the University of York achieved 158 points – the 26th highest in the country. The university gave offers of admission to 78.5% of its applicants in 2015, the joint 15th lowest amongst the Russell Group. There are around 6.2 applications for every undergraduate place, and a completion rate of 93.2% with around 80% of graduates graduating with a First/2:1.

17.9% of York's undergraduates are privately educated, the joint 20th highest proportion amongst mainstream British universities. In the 2016–17 academic year, the university had a domicile breakdown of 80:5:16 of UK:EU:non-EU students respectively with a female to male ratio of 56:44. 56.2% of international students enrolled at the institution are from China, the third highest proportion out of all mainstream universities in the UK.

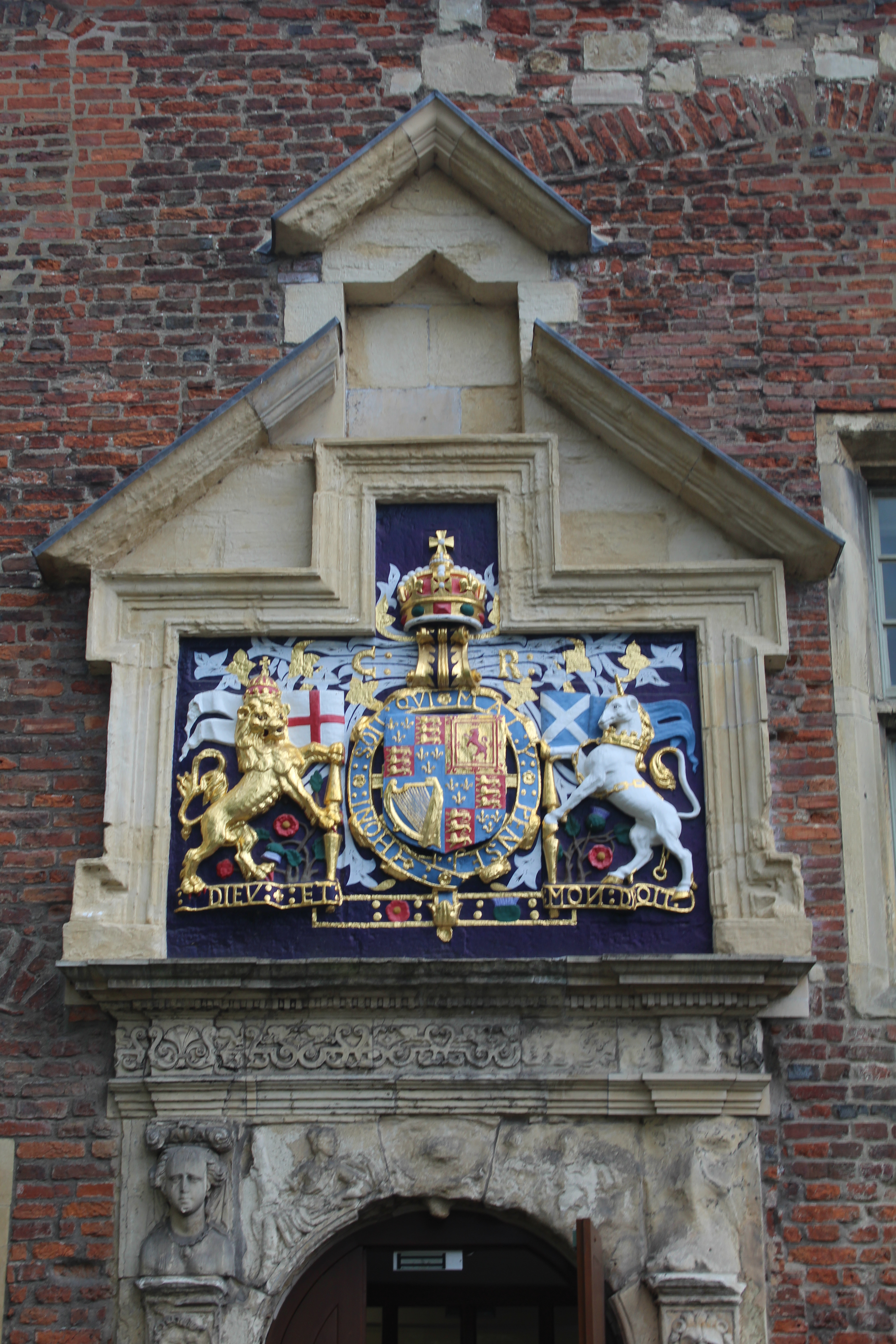
Coat of Arms above King's Manor.

== Student activities ==
=== Representation ===
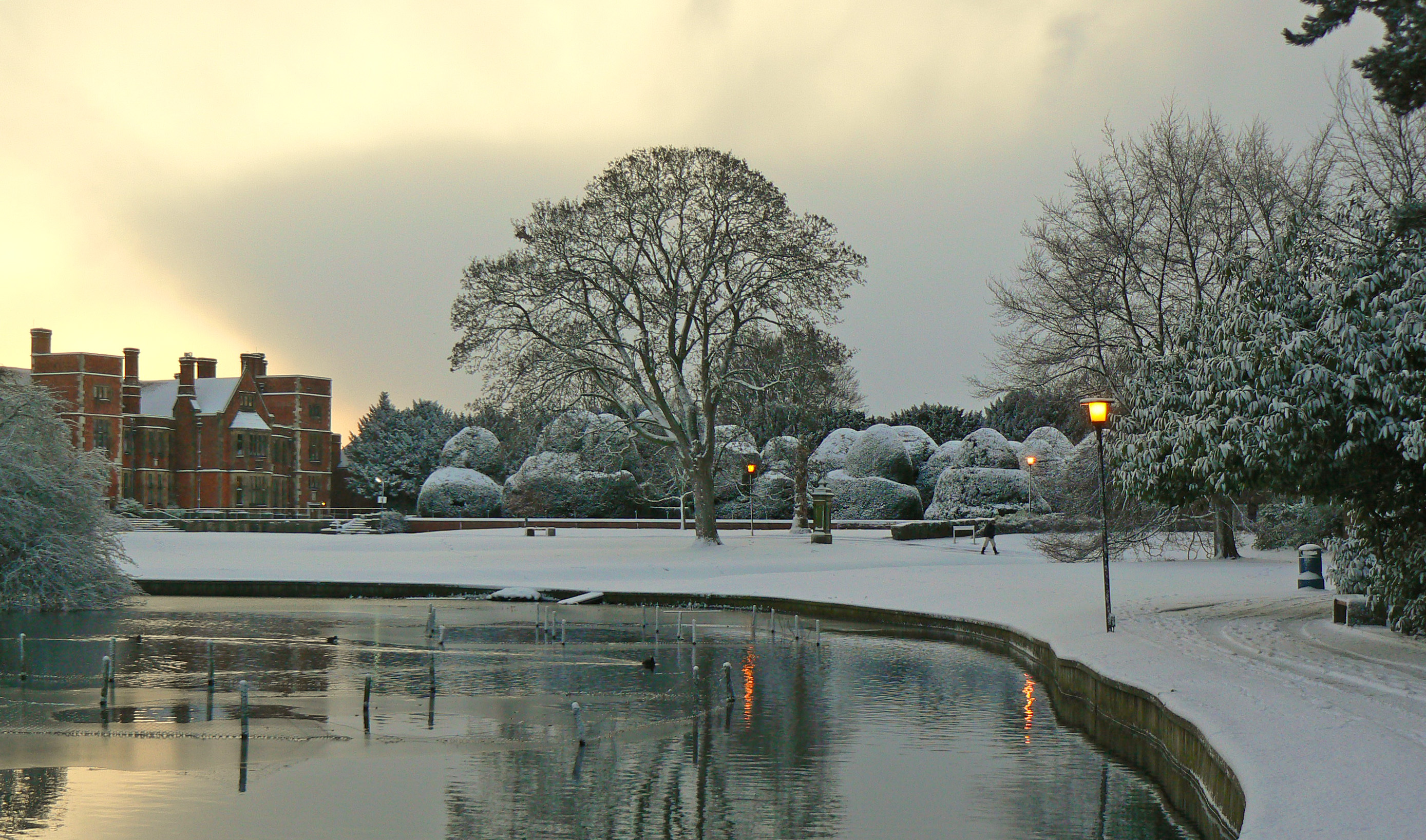
Heslington Hall in winter

The students' union is the University of York Students' Union and is referred to as YorkSU. Its membership is currently the entire student population of the university. It merged with the postgraduate union, the Graduate Students Association (GSA) in 2024. In 2008 YUSU was able to open its first Union-run licensed venue The Courtyard.

Each college has its own JCRC or students' association which provide a variety of services, including college events and student welfare services; they also organise the Freshers' Fortnight activities in their college.

Non-partisan political societies are well represented at the university, with the York Student Think Tank, which produces student policy research and hosts informal debates; the York Dialectic Union, which hosts speakers and debates; and the debating society, which competes in inter-varsity debating tournaments against other universities. There are also party political societies on campus with the University of York Labour Club, the University of York Liberal Democrat Society, the University of York Conservative and Unionist Association and the University of York Green Party Society; campaigning on issues both on and off campus, as well as organising debates and talks by high-profile speakers. There is also a branch of People and Planet, which campaigns on environmental and ethical issues. Additionally, there is an active Palestinian Solidarity Society, and multiple pro-Palestinian protests and encampments have appeared over the past few years.

There are multiple organisations for lesbian, gay, bisexual, trans and queer (LGBT) students. The York SU LGBTQ+ Network is a liberation society built into the students' union, which represents LGBTQ+ students by campaigning for issues on campus, offering welfare & support and running events for all LGBTQ+ students to attend, such as cabaret evenings and chilled mixers. YorQueer, formerly the LGBTQ Social Society, also organises social events aimed at LGBTQ+ students and their friends. In November 2024 the two officially merged, however as of May 2025 they still use both the YorQueer and Network labels for different events. They have strong links with the Staff LGBTI+ Matters Forum, which offers a largely similar provision to staff members of the university. Additionally, the 2024/25 academic year saw the creation of the Sapphic Society, which "aims to provide an uplifting and inclusive space for all students interested in Sapphic culture, identity and history".

=== Student Union bars and venues ===
The university's Students' Union run a number of bars and venues across both campuses, namely The Courtyard, The Kitchen, The Glasshouse, The Lounge and Vanbrugh Arms. Additionally, the Union also ran a venue known as D-Bar (located in Derwent College) but had to temporarily close it due to the COVID-19 pandemic. D-Bar later reopened as a cafe during refurbishments of Derwent, before fully reopening in 2022. Shortly after reopening as a bar, D-Bar was hosting an LGBTQ+ event when it was gate crashed by Derwent College Rugby team which was criticised on social media by the then-LGBTQ+ Officers, Matt Rogan and Daniel Loyd.

In 2020, Patrick O'Donnell, the president of YUSU, unveiled a new, purpose built venue named The Forest which would be used for a wide variety of events. Later that year, Brian Terry, the then Student Activities Officer, had the venue used as part of a week long Freshers Fair, advertising societies and clubs to students in a Covid-safe environment.

In 2021, The Lakeside Tap was opened to replace The Forest but was closed the next year.

=== Media ===
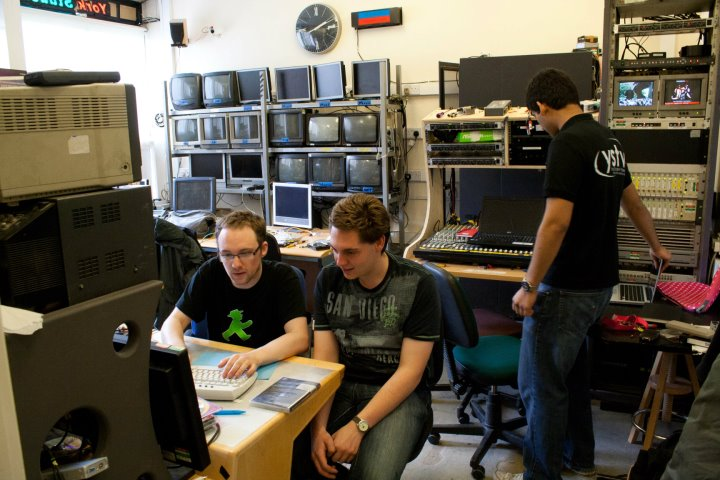
York Student Television control room, located in James College

York Student Television (YSTV) was founded at the university in 1967 and is England's oldest student television station. YSTV once held the world record for longest continuous television broadcast under a single director. It was named the best student television station at the 2012, 2014, 2019 and 2025 NaSTA Awards. The University of York Filmmaking Society was a student-run filmmaking group; between 1999 and 2014 its members made two feature films and many shorts, some of which were shown at national film festivals.

University Radio York (URY) is the oldest independent radio station in the United Kingdom and winner of the Student Radio Awards Best Station Award 2020.

Nouse was established in 1964 and was 2005 NUS/Mirror Student paper of the year and 2009 NUS Best Student Media. It has also won multiple Guardian Student Newspaper awards throughout the past decade, for both its pioneering website and outstanding individual journalists. Its rival newspaper, Vision, was named Guardian Student Newspaper of the Year for three consecutive years between 2002 and 2004—the only time this has occurred in the 27-year history of the prestigious awards—and won it again in 2007. In 2011, it won the award for a fifth time, making it the most awarded student newspaper in the United Kingdom. It also won Best Small Budget Publication at the 2006 NUS/Mirror National Student Media Awards.

Matrix, the campus feminist newspaper, was founded in 1990 and ran until 2000, and was then relaunched in 2006 as Matrix Reloaded.

The Lemon Press, York's satire magazine, was launched in 2009, in both print and online formats. In 2010 it won the NUS Award for Best Student Media. The Yorker is an online publication set up by students as an independent company in 2007; it was nominated for the Guardian Student media awards after running for only a few months, though has not published since 2023.

York Student Cinema (YSC), operating since 1966, show 3 films a week, using an industry standard Christie CP2000 digital projector and a full size CinemaScope screen in one of the largest rooms on campus. It has won the BFFS film society of the year award several times, and celebrated its 50th anniversary in 2016.

In 2019, the History of Art department began publishing Aspectus, an annual research journal edited by current postgraduates within the department.

=== Sports ===
The university teams play in black-and-gold colours. York is a member of British Universities and Colleges Sport (BUCS) and has 65 teams participating. At the end of the 2013/14 BUCS season York came 38th out of 145 participating institutions.

As well as BUCS every summer term the university take part in the Roses Tournament, a sports competition against Lancaster University, which is the largest inter-university tournament in Europe. The venue of the event alternates each year between York and Lancaster, and involves numerous sports clubs, including the conventional (football, hockey) and the more unusual (octopush, ultimate frisbee). As of 2015 Lancaster are leading York with 30 wins to 28, with one draw in 1974.

The university has also previously also been in the White Rose Varsity Tournament. This started in 2005 against York's other university, York St John University. York won all six of the tournaments held. In 2011 attempts to try and increase the competitiveness of the competition saw York St John replaced by the University of Hull. York won all 3 tournaments against Hull, which resulted in it being scrapped in 2013.

In 2014 College Varsity was created, which is held between the colleges of the University of York and the colleges of Durham University.

=== Arts ===
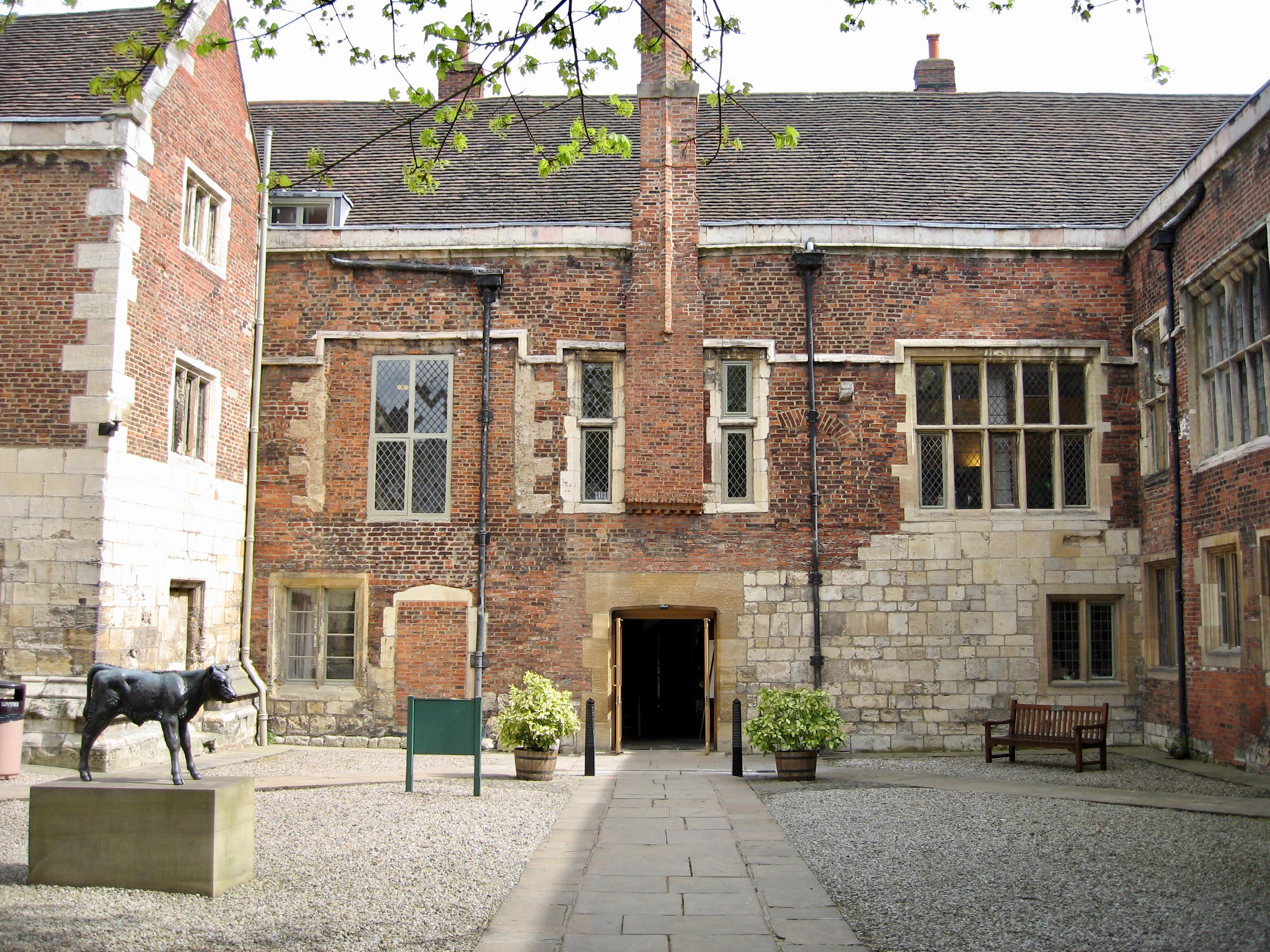
The courtyard at King's Manor. A bronze sculpture of a Frisian calf by Sally Arnup can be seen.

The University of York Music Society and the University of York Drama Society are two of the largest student societies on campus; with each having performances and/or concerts every week during term. Central Hall Musical Society performs a number of shows and showcases every year.

Other performing societies include the Gilbert and Sullivan Society, PantSoc who stage a student-written pantomime three times a year, and York ComedySoc, who perform a comedy show every week. ComedySoc sends two shows to the Edinburgh Fringe each year: The Shambles and The Dead Ducks. Both troupes perform throughout the year and have received critical acclaim for their shows at the Edinburgh Fringe.

=== Long Boi ===
Long Boi was a 70-cm tall Indian Runner-Mallard Duck cross that lived by Derwent College, and became an unofficial mascot to the university. In 2022 students campaigned to erect a life-sized statue of Long Boi due to his 'cultural significance' and 'contribution to student life'. In response, the union president said that he would explore possible options to construct a statue. In spring 2023, after several months without a confirmed sighting, the university announced that Long Boi was presumed to be dead.

A fundraising campaign raised enough money to commission a life-size bronze statue of Long Boi by sculptor Neil Mason. The statue was formally unveiled by BBC Radio Presenter Greg James in The University of York's Central Hall on 26 September 2024. However, on the night of 14 November 2024, the statue was vandalised and sustained damage to its left leg. It was later removed indefinitely, and a subsequent investigation failed to identify the responsible party.

== Notable alumni and academics ==
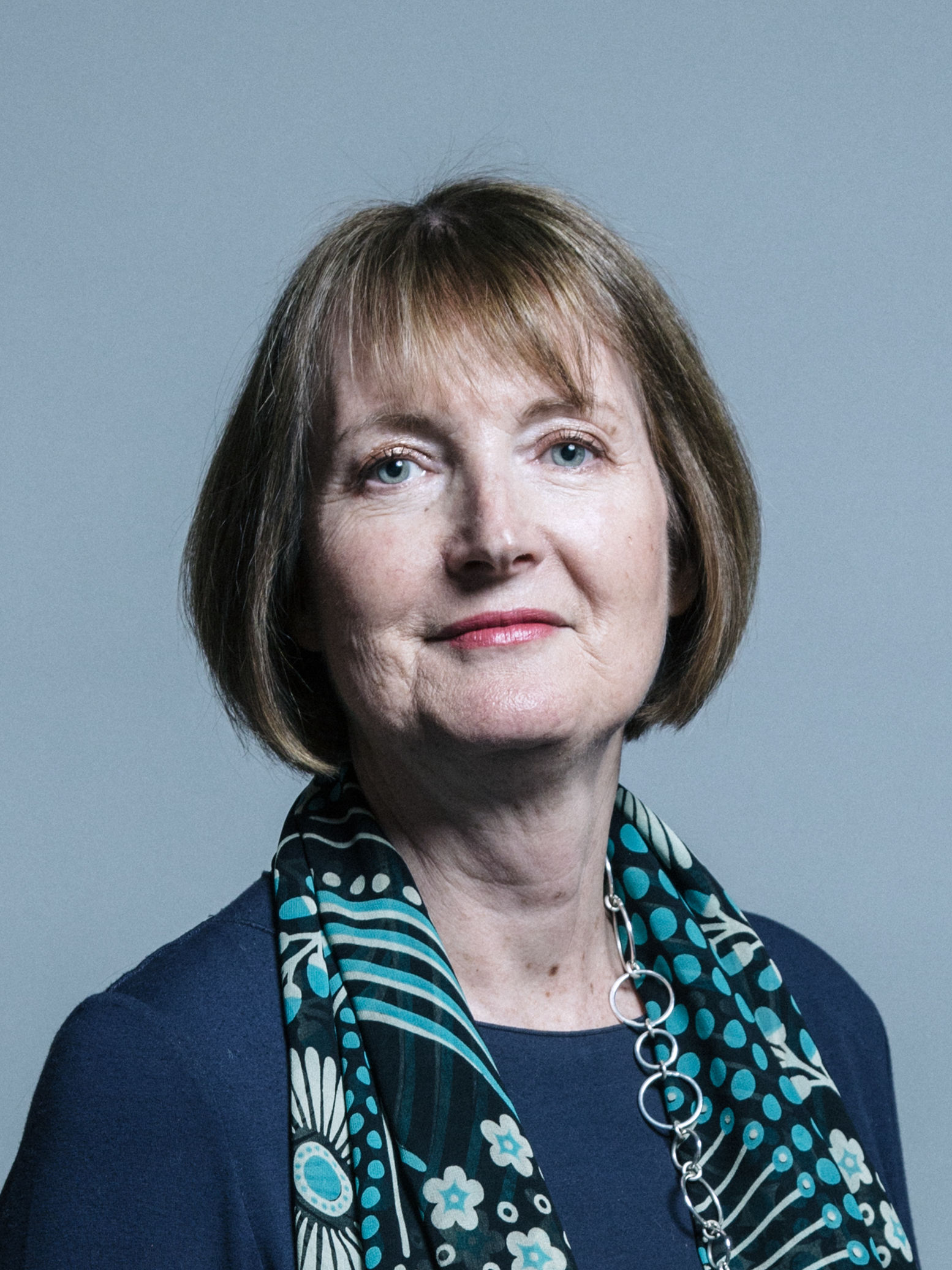
Former Member of Parliament Harriet Harman is an alumna of York.

York has a large number of alumni who have been active in politics, including at least twenty members of the United Kingdom Parliament, five members of the House of Lords, two members of the Scottish Parliament, one member of the European Parliament and several ministers of other governments around the world. The former president and former prime minister of Portugal Aníbal Cavaco Silva completed his doctorate in economics at York. South Korea's 39th prime minister, Han Seung-soo earned his doctorate in economics in 1968. Former governor-general of Belize Colville Young holds a doctorate in linguistics from York. The senior vice president of the World Bank Group Mahmoud Mohieldin holds a master's degree in economic and social policy analysis from York.

Prominent alumnus Daron Acemoglu has been named a recipient of the Nobel Prize in economic science.

The university is also represented by alumni educated in the liberal arts such as English literature, social sciences, economics, philosophy, medieval history, and music. The author Anthony Horowitz attended York and graduated in 1973 with a degree in English literature and art history. Greg Dyke, chair of the Football Association and British Film Institute, is a former student, and graduated in 1974 with a BA in politics, returning to York as university chancellor from 2004 to 2015. Writer, critic and broadcaster, Victor Lewis-Smith, studied music in the late 1970s. The comedian Harry Enfield studied politics, graduating in 1982. The current director of the Natural History Museum, Sir Michael Dixon, has a PhD in zoology from York. Presenter and former web developer Tom Scott graduated with a degree in linguistics from York. Businesswoman and Dragons' Den star Sara Davies graduated from York with a business degree in 2006.

More recently, due to expansion into areas of technology, it has also produced notable computer scientists, such as the Ethereum co-founder Gavin Wood, computer scientist Chris Lilley, and computational biologist Sue Jones.

Prominent academics associated with the University of York include the distinguished literary teacher F. R. Leavis and anti-apartheid activist Adrian Leftwich.

== See also ==
- Armorial of UK universities
- List of UK universities
- Plate glass university
- White Rose Theatre, theatre company originating at the university
- York College, further education college in York
- York St John University, another university in York
