= Goodricke College, York =

College of the University of York, England

Coordinates: 53.94846°N 1.03111°W

Goodricke College
- University of York
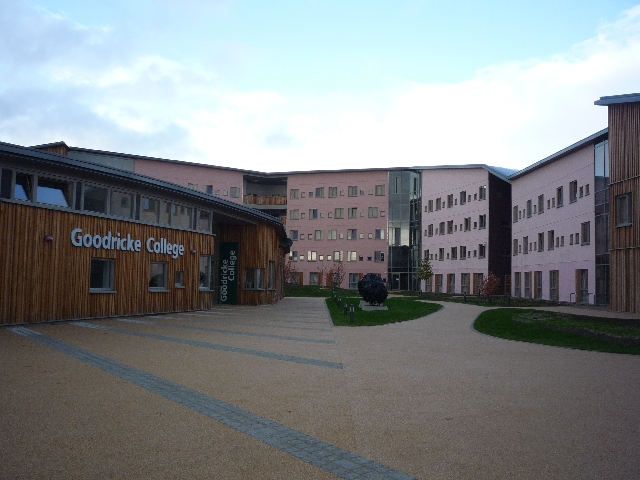
- Goodricke College, Heslington East campus
- Location: Heslington East, York
- Motto: "Setting the standard"
- Established: 1968
- Named for: John Goodricke
- Undergraduates: 1,685 (2022/2023)
- Postgraduates: 150 (2022/2023)
- Mascot: Ricke
- Website: Goodricke – Colleges, University of York
- JCR: Goodricke College

Goodricke College is a college of the University of York. It was founded in 1968 and named after the astronomer John Goodricke. The college has approximately 1500 undergraduate members, of whom some 500 live in college accommodation, and about 140 postgraduate members, most of whom live in college accommodation.

== History ==
=== Heslington West ===
Goodricke College was opened on 18 October 1968 by Michael Swann and was the fifth college to be built. The opening of Goodricke is commemorated by a plaque on the outside of the Old Dining Hall – now part of James College.

While Goodricke College was located on Heslington West, it had four accommodation blocks: A, B, C and D. Blocks A and B were standard university accommodation, built to the CLASP system, and situated near the main college Nucleus. C-block and D-block were whitewashed brick buildings, considered to provide a lower quality of accommodation to A- and B-blocks. C-block was located next to the college Nucleus, while D-block was situated on the other side of the university lake from the main college buildings. The reason for the detached nature of D-block is that it was once part of Wentworth College. The internal walls of Blocks C and D were noted for their lack of plaster. Campus legend has it that this lack of plaster is due to fire regulations requiring a minimum width in corridors.

During the 2002 York University Students' Union (YUSU) 'Collegeopoly' campaign about accommodation rent Goodricke College C Block was deemed to be the worst accommodation at York University, inspiring the unflattering nickname Cell Block C. The Campaigns Officers created a mockup of a Monopoly board with different accommodation blocks taking the places of the traditional streets. Goodricke C-block took the place of Old Kent Road.

In 2002–2003, the Goodricke Student Junior Common Room Committee, ran a campaign to Grade C list C- and D-blocks to raise awareness amongst students and administration regarding the university's lack of maintenance of the accommodation. Over 10 years after the previous makeover, the blocks were finally given new carpeting, kitchen units, furniture and internet access. However, the rooms were upgraded to 'Standard' instead of 'Economy' by administration, thus forcing the inhabitants to pay the same amount as for more spacious accommodation. C- and D-blocks, meant to be demolished for a number of years, have exceeded their stated lifetime, but due to shortages in accommodation campus-wide, they have had to serve longer.

In 2003 the college saw the closure of its old dining facilities and the opening of The Roger Kirk Centre, now part of James College. The centre is a new purpose-built amenities building and consists of a large dining room, and smaller coffee and snack bar. It is named after Roger Kirk, a former member of the University Court.

=== Move to Heslington East ===
In 2003, the university set out plans to create a campus for 5,000 additional students, Heslington East. In May 2008 the City of York planners approved the design for the new campus. It was decided that rather than create a new college that an existing College should be moved. Goodricke College was selected for this and moved onto the new campus in 2009 with James College taking over its building on Heslington West. The old Goodricke buildings were divided between James College and Vanbrugh College.

2009 marked the 40th anniversary of Goodricke College, with celebrations throughout the academic year to mark the occasion.

== Buildings and services ==
Goodricke Nucleus is the name of the main administrative and facility building in Goodricke College and is located on the Heslington East campus. It also houses the Junior Common Room and the General Common Room. Portering services are provided from the Ron Cooke Hub. Goodricke consists of a mixture of standard and en-suite accommodation and a large, central, 'nucleus' with large JCR, GCR and offices for staff. This approximately doubled the capacity of the college to over 600 students, including 100 postgraduate students.

The new college accommodation is divided into Courts, each named after a member of the university who has made a significant contribution to its life: Oliver Sheldon, Janet Baker and Kenneth Dixon. Originally, each of the Courts has a resident member of college staff. The College Dean lived in Janet Baker Court while at least one College Tutor lived in each of the other Courts.

Heslington East is connected to the Heslington West campus by the 66, 67, and 68 buses, all of which are free to students not travelling further than these campuses.

== List of Provosts ==
The head of college of Goodricke is titled the Provost. The current Provost is Professor Matt Matravers.

- Michael Woolfson (1968 to 1972) first provost
- Professor Bill Shiels (1983 to 1995) provost
- Jane Clarbour (2004 to 2015)
- Professor Matt Matravers (2015 to present)

== Alumni ==
- Christine Hamilton
- Harriet Harman
- Fleur Anderson
- Joanna Moorhead
