= Fleur Anderson =

British politician (born 1971)

Fleur Anderson MP
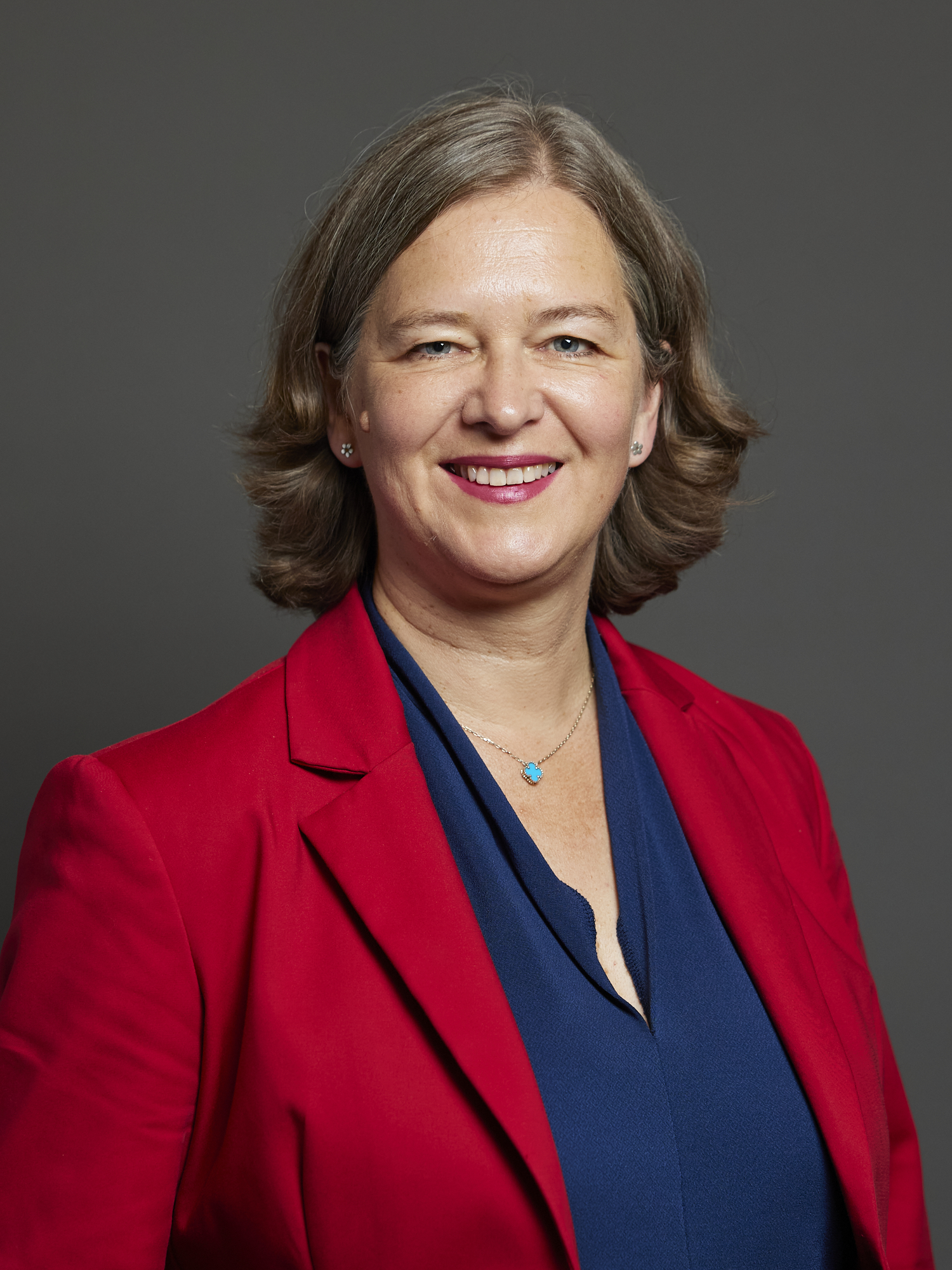
- Official portrait, 2024

Parliamentary Under-Secretary of State for Northern Ireland
- In office 9 July 2024 – 7 September 2025
- Prime Minister: Keir Starmer
- Preceded by: The Lord Caine
- Succeeded by: Matthew Patrick

Member of Parliament for Putney
- Incumbent
- Assumed office 12 December 2019
- Preceded by: Justine Greening
- Majority: 12,488 (25.3%)

Member of Wandsworth Council for Bedford
- In office 22 May 2014 – 29 March 2021
- Succeeded by: Hannah Stanislaus

Personal details
- Born: Kathleen Fleur Anderson; 6 February 1971 (age 55) Jersey, Channel Islands
- Party: Labour
- Education: Goodricke College, York (BSc); The Open University (MSc)
- Website: www.fleuranderson.co.uk

Kathleen Fleur Anderson (born 6 February 1971) is a British politician serving as Member of Parliament (MP) for Putney since 2019. A member of the Labour Party, she served as Parliamentary Under-Secretary of State for Northern Ireland between 2024 and 2025.

== Early life and education ==
Anderson was born on the Channel Island of Jersey. She graduated with a Bachelor of Science degree in politics from the University of York in 1993. She was a member of Goodricke College. She was elected as president of the Student's Union, holding that post in 1993/94. In 2007, she attended the Open University for a Master of Science degree in Global Development Management, awarded in 2010.

== Career ==
=== International development and advocacy ===
Anderson began her career in development and environmental and poverty campaigns, both in London and abroad. She worked for Christian Aid from 1994 to 1997, taking on roles as a campaign assistant in London, working in Serbia during the war and as Head of Country Office in Bosnia in the aftermath of the Bosnian War. From 1997 to 1999 she was Head of World Action for the Methodist youth organisation MAYC, leading campaigns on bullying, Burma and international debt cancellation. She then worked for CAFOD in London as Head of Campaigns and Advocacy Strategy Manager. Here she co-founded the Trade Justice Campaign. From 2003 to 2006 she was a trustee of the Jubilee Debt Campaign. During her time as a freelance consultant in Kenya from 2007 to 2010, she worked on several successful campaigns on water and urban nutrition, working with organisations such as End Water Poverty and Oxfam, as well as helping to establish grassroots organisations such as the Shalom Centre for Conflict Resolution and Reconciliation. Upon returning to London, Anderson joined WaterAid as Head of Global Campaigns.

=== Politics ===
Anderson decided to get involved in politics in response to the closing of children's centres and local institutions. She was elected to represent Bedford Ward on Wandsworth London Borough Council in 2014, alongside Rosena Allin-Khan, and re-elected in 2018. Anderson was the Labour Spokesperson for Community Services and the Environment from 2015 to 2018 and the Deputy Leader of Wandsworth Labour Group from 2016 to 2018. She resigned from the council in March 2021.

She co-founded Wandsworth Welcomes Refugees and was the head of community services for the Katherine Low Settlement, a community centre in Battersea from 2016 to 2020. Locally, she campaigned for the 20 mph speed limit, against the closure of children's centres, and against cutting the Autism Advisory Service.

Anderson was elected MP for Putney on 12 December 2019, succeeding retiring MP Justine Greening, who had been elected as a Conservative. In a national election in which Labour won its fewest House seats since 1935, Putney was the only constituency Labour gained. She made her maiden speech on 9 January 2020. She backed Keir Starmer and Rosena Allin-Khan in the 2020 Labour leadership and deputy leadership elections, respectively.

On 7 January 2021, Anderson was promoted from Parliamentary Private Secretary to Preet Gill as Shadow Secretary of State for International Development to replace Helen Hayes as a Shadow Minister for the Cabinet under Rachel Reeves due to Hayes resigning over Labour's support for the European Union (Future Relationship) Act 2020. In December 2021, she was promoted within the shadow Cabinet Office team to serve as Shadow Paymaster General. In the September 2023 shadow cabinet reshuffle, leader Keir Starmer appointed her to be Shadow Minister for Northern Ireland.

Anderson wrote a letter to Prime Minister Rishi Sunak requesting a ceasefire in Gaza and a ban on sale of arms to Israel in April 2024.

Following the 2024 general election, Anderson was appointed Parliamentary Under-Secretary of State for Northern Ireland, she held the position until the September 2025 reshuffle when she returned to the back benches. She is currently the chair of the Environment All Party Parliamentary Group.

Parliament of the United Kingdom
Preceded by Justine Greening	Member of Parliament for Putney; 2019–present	Incumbent
