= Vanbrugh College, York =

College of the University of York, England

Coordinates: 53.94778°N 1.05452°W

Vanbrugh College
- University of York
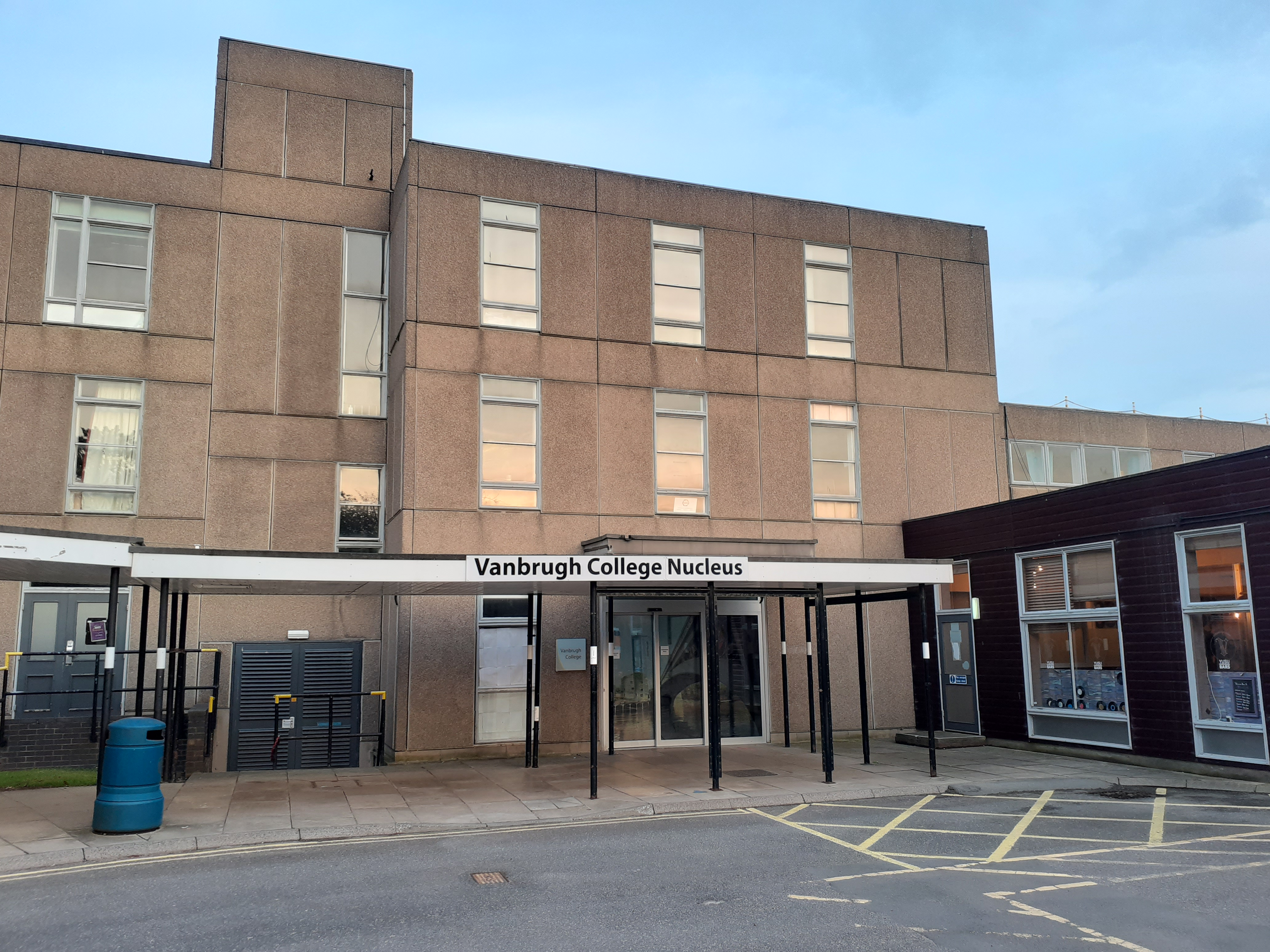
- Vanbrugh College Nucleus
- Location: Heslington West, York
- Established: 1967
- Named for: Sir John Vanbrugh
- College Manager: Georgina Heath
- Principal: Rob Aitken
- Deputy College Manager: Larry Healy
- Undergraduates: 1,740 (2022/2023)
- Postgraduates: 130 (2022/2023)
- Mascot: Duck Norris
- Website: Vanbrugh College
- JCR: Vanbrugh CSA

Vanbrugh College is one of the eleven colleges of the University of York.

== History ==
It was opened in 1967 and is named after Sir John Vanbrugh, designer of Castle Howard.

In 2013 'Green Vanbrugh' was established. This group was created to increase awareness of the environmental issues within the college and to promote involvement from college members.

== Buildings and services ==
The college is home to the History and History of Art departments, Language and Linguistics and Music together with some 2100 undergraduates and 180 graduate students.

The main college building, three storeys high and constructed in the 1960s in the CLASP system, consists of four blocks arranged within a square. The western, northern and eastern blocks are known, respectively, as A, B and C blocks, all of which were residential blocks when the college opened in 1968. The southern side, often known as the teaching block, contains offices for the History and History of Art departments plus two lecture theatres. It was also the base for the Mathematics department until the early 2000s. C Block also houses a Computing Service computer room, V058, previously known in abbreviated form as "vuft" when it belonged to the Computer Science department.

In addition, social space located in an extension off the teaching block includes a dining hall, V-bar, JCR, SCR, a Porter's Lodge and a corridor known as Vanbrugh Stalls, which takes its name from the frequent society and ticket-selling stalls that are set up there.

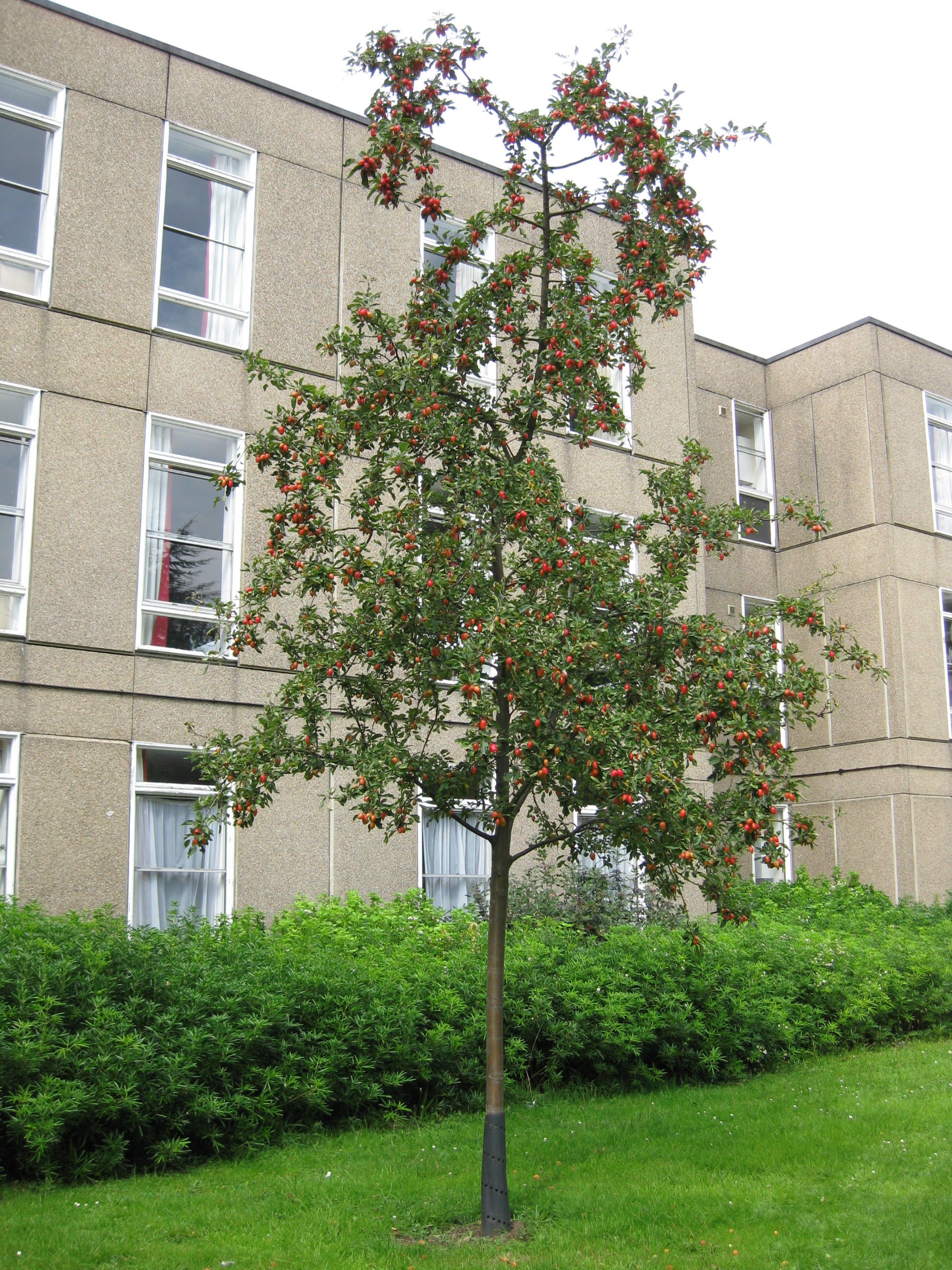
One of the interior grassed areas of Le Page Court

A further building to the west contains offices for the Students Union as well as Your:Books, the Students' Union second hand book store. Now called Grimston House, it was originally known as X Block. University buildings are named by their college or building name initial and then a block letter. As the fourth block in Vanbrugh, this would have been known as VD block. The university decided to call it VX instead. This was in part as the building, when viewed from above, was X-shaped. The building underwent major alterations in 1999, changing the shape of the east frontage, and was then renamed.

Vanbrugh students also can apply for off-campus accommodation at Fairfax House which is situated on Heslington Road, approximately 10 minutes walk from the main college building, housing approximately 90 students, in addition to around 30 Vanbrugh residents in the hall of residence on Fulford Road, Fulford House.

In 2005 it was decided that half of Block B and all of Block C would be converted into offices. In January 2006, 86 students moved into P and Q blocks of Alcuin College while retaining their membership of Vanbrugh College. These accommodation arrangements were only for the year 2005–2006 while the old Bleachfield site to the north-west of Heslington campus was completed.

Vanbrugh is made up of four main accommodation areas:

- Donald Barron and Barbara Scott Courts - named after prominent former members of the university.
- Eric Milner-White Court - in 2009, when Goodricke College moved to the Heslington East development, the original Goodricke site was divided between Vanbrugh College and James College. While James College received the old Goodricke nucleus and Cell Block C (Now N Block), Vanbrugh College received Blocks A and B, which were renamed Eric Milner-White court after the Very Reverend Eric Milner-White who died in 1963. From 2011 Wentworth E block was pinned to Eric Milner-White court for Vanbrugh undergraduate use after a renovation of blocks A-D by Wentworth College meant it did not meet postgraduate standard. Wenworth E block is an exact copy of the old Cell Block C, now James N block.
- Fairfax House - originally constructed in 1922, Fairfax House was initially accommodation for nurses working at The Retreat. When acquired by the university, it was merged with Vanbrugh College, and now serves as off-campus accommodation for 90 students.
- Le Page Court - Le Page is Vanbrugh's oldest accommodation on campus. Used as undergraduate accommodation, the former blocks A and B were renamed when the college let go of its old C block. The name is used in honour of the first Vanbrugh provost, Professor Robert Le Page. In 2012, the top floor of the 3 storey building was reclaimed as offices for the History department.

The paved area between Vanbrugh College and the lake, previously known as Vanbrugh Paradise, was renamed as Greg's Place in 2016 in honour of Greg Dyke who had been university chancellor till 2015.

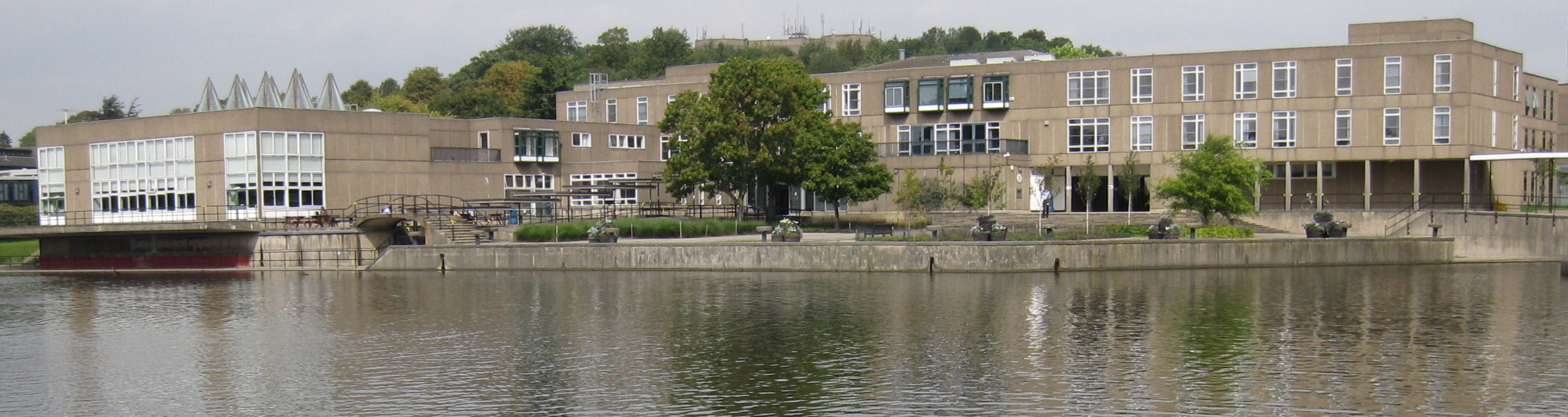
Panorama of Vanbrugh "paradise" viewed from across the lake

=== University Radio York ===
Between Vanbrugh A Block and Grimston House a shed, once used as a cleaners' cupboard, is used by University Radio York: the first legal independent radio station in the United Kingdom, which broadcasts online, on 88.3 FM and on DAB digital radio

== Organisation and administration ==
The Head of college is the Principal, a university academic who shares teaching duties with college responsibilities. Initially the head of Vanbrugh College was titled Provost, but from 2013 this was changed to Principal. The incumbent principal is Professor Andy Parsons.

=== List of Principals ===
There have been five Principals of Vanbrugh College:

- Professor Robert Le Page (1967–1972)
- Reverend Dr Gerald Higginson (1972–1984)
- Dr Allen Warren (1984–2008)
- Reverend Dr David Efird (2008–2013)
- Dr Barry Thomas (2013–2016)
- Professor Andy Parsons (2016-Present)

== Student life ==
=== Student representation ===
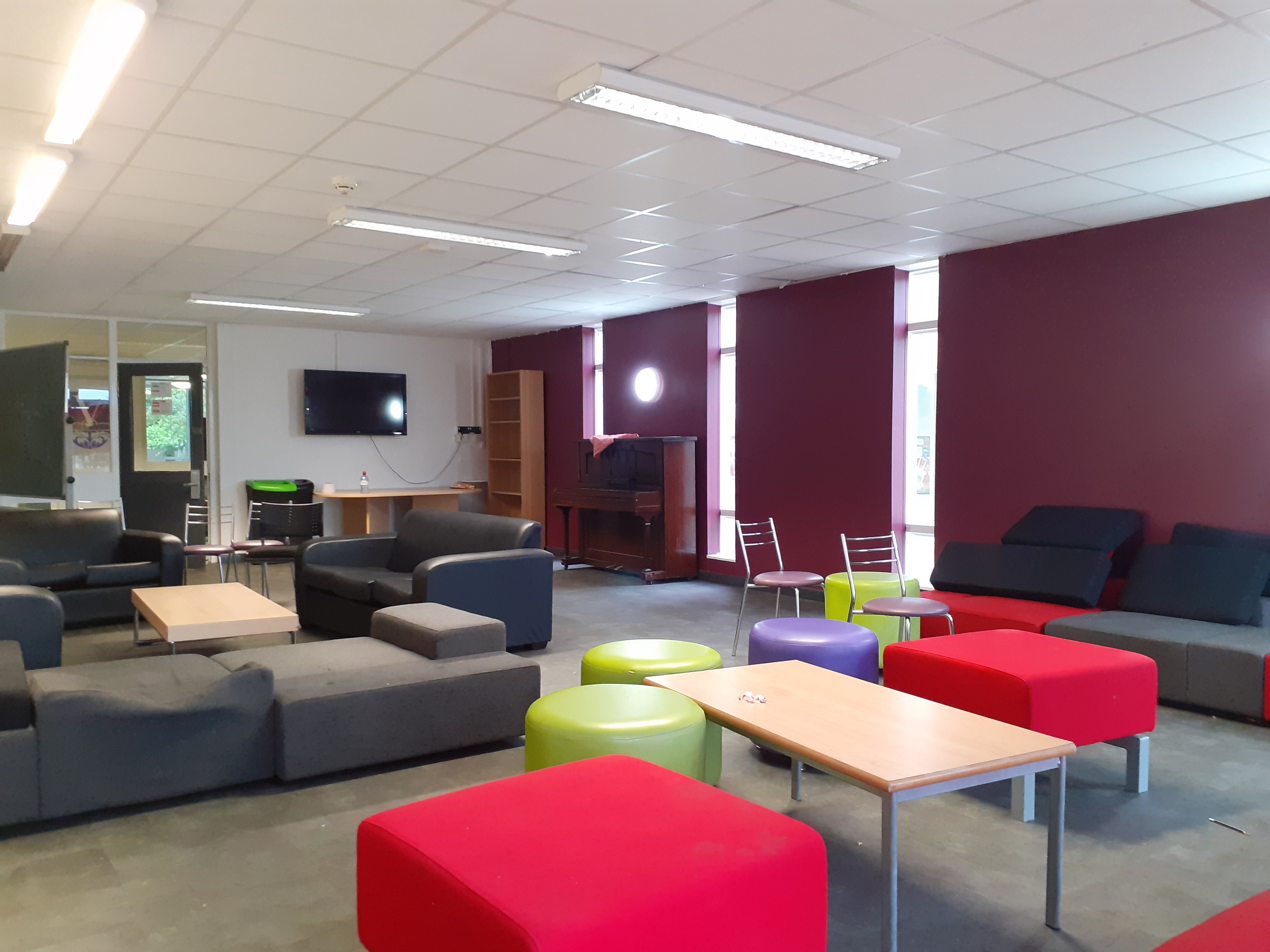
The junior common room

All undergraduate members of Vanbrugh College are members of the Junior Common Room, and continue to remain members throughout their time at the university. In 2021, the JCRC was rebranded as a College Student Association (CSA) via a referendum. The Vanbrugh College Student Association (VSA) consists of around 40 members and is headed by the President. There is additionally a Senior Common Room for the use of postgraduate students.

=== Events ===
Volume was a disco-type event run by Vanbrugh VSA. The event took place in the college bar, JCR and Vanbrugh Hall simultaneously, with each of which playing a different style of music. All areas have a late licence, usually until 1:00 am. Occasionally this is extended until 1:30 am. With a capacity of 600, it is the largest college venue on campus. Volume is the rebranded version of Planet V, which was scrapped at the end of 2007. In 2013, the decision to drop Volume.

However, as of the start of the 2016 Fresher's Week, the VSA brought back Planet V to huge success, exceeding capacity of over 500. The event has now been set up a termly event and has become a key characteristic of the central college.
