= Colleges of the University of York =

The University of York has eleven colleges. These colleges provide most of the accommodation for undergraduates and postgraduates at the university. While lectures, examinations, laboratories and facilities such as the central library are run by the university, the colleges play an important role in the pastoral care of the student body.

Every student is a member of a college, staff may choose to join a college if they wish. All the colleges are of equal status, but each has its own constitution. The day-to-day running of the colleges is managed by an elected committee of staff and student members chaired by the college's 'Senior College Fellow', alongside the administrative College Manager.

Each college has a Junior Common Room or College Student Association for students, which is managed by the elected Junior Common Room/College Student Association Committee. The older colleges also have a Senior Common Room, which is managed by elected representatives of the college's academic and administrative members. The colleges are deliberately assigned undergraduates, postgraduate students and staff from a wide mixture of disciplines.

== History ==
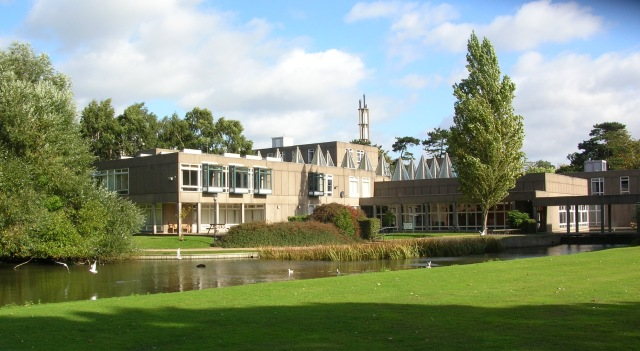
Derwent College, one of the two original colleges founded in 1965.

In 1963 the University of York opened. At the time, the university consisted of three buildings, principally the historic King's Manor in the city centre and Heslington Hall, which has Tudor foundations and is in the village of Heslington on the edge of York. A year later, work began on purpose-built structures on the Heslington West campus, including the construction of the Colleges, which now form the main part of the university.

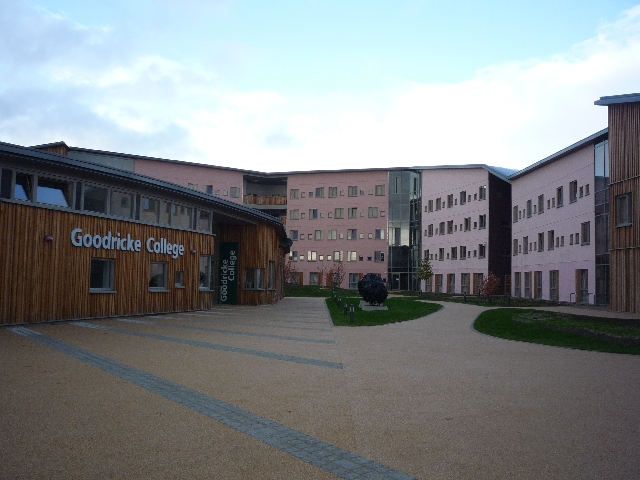
Goodricke College was originally based on Heslington West, it moved to Heslington East in 2009 becoming the first college on that campus.

Baron James of Rusholme, the university's first Vice-Chancellor, set out to create a modern university which retained and updated the collegiate system of the traditional collegiate universities of Oxbridge, It was planned that "Each college will be a unit of 300 students, 150 of whom will be resident, the remainder being in lodgings or in student flats, but using the college as their social centre. This organisation is unlike that of Oxford and Cambridge on one hand or the halls of residence at civic universities on the other. The college will differ from 'Oxbridge' in that they will not be autonomous financially, nor will they be responsible for admission of students or appointment of staff. They will differ from halls of residence in that teaching will be carried on in them." York's first two Colleges, Derwent and Langwith were founded in 1965, and were followed by Alcuin and Vanbrugh in 1967. Goodricke and Wentworth were founded shortly afterwards, in 1968 and 1972 respectively.

After 1972 the construction of Colleges ceased until 1990 with the foundation of James College, York. Initially James was intended to be a postgraduate only college, however the university began to rapidly expand in size almost doubling in size from 4,300 to 8,500 students, in 1993 therefore it was decided that the college should become open to undergraduates. The expansion of student numbers also resulted in the creation of more accommodation by the university which was named 'Halifax Court'; the members of Halifax Court were members of other colleges however soon formed their own Junior Common Room. In 2002 Halifax Court was made a full College of the university and was renamed as Halifax College, York.

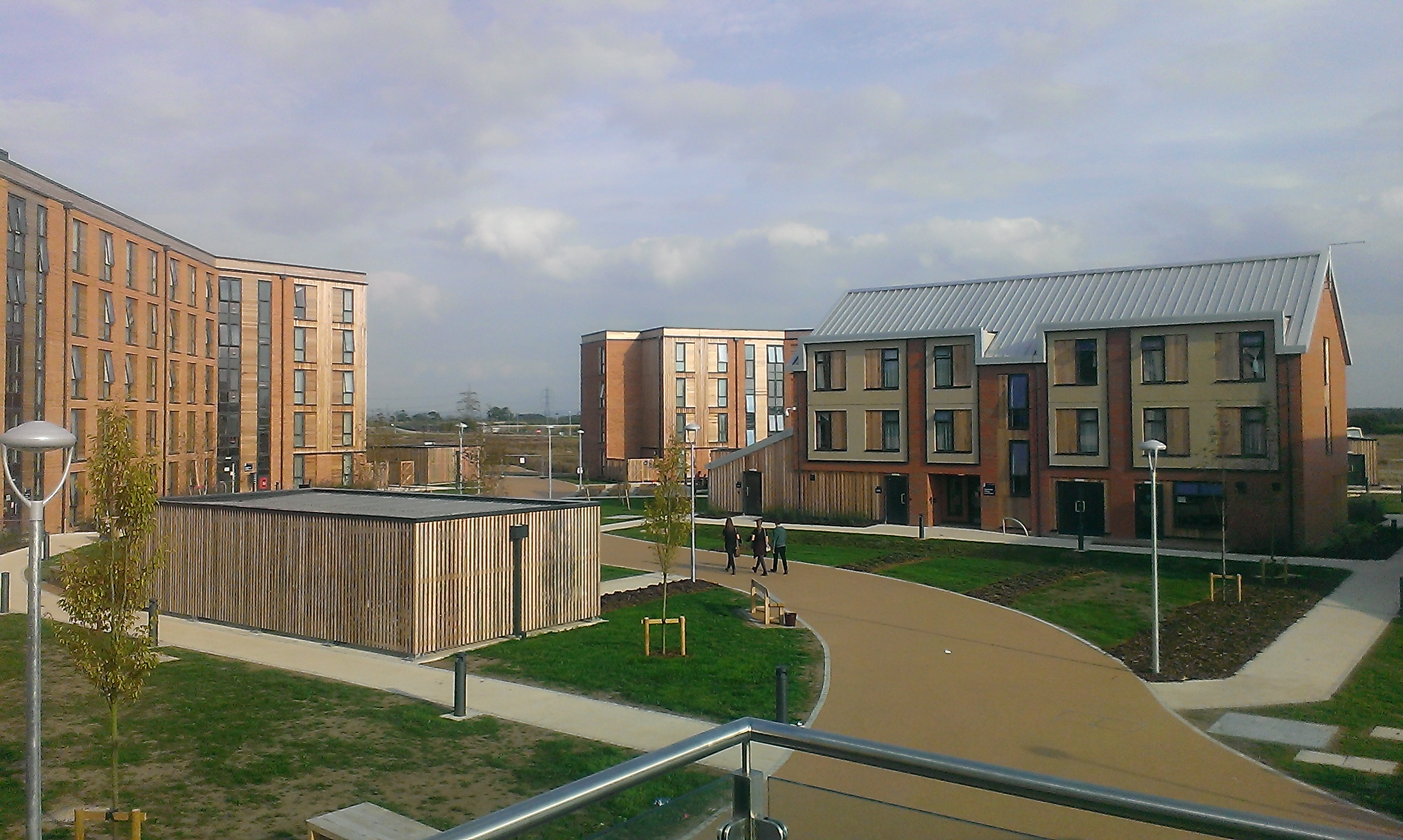
Constantine College was founded in 2014.

In 2003, the university set out plans to create a campus for 5,000 additional students, Heslington East. In May 2008 the City of York planners approved the design for the new campus. It was decided that rather than create a new college that an existing College should be moved. Goodricke College was selected for this and moved onto the new campus in 2009 with James taking over its building on Heslington West. In 2012 the same process took place with Langwith moving to Heslington East and Derwent taking over its previous buildings.

In 2014 Heslington East saw the establishment of the ninth college and was named Constantine after the Roman emperor Constantine the Great, who was proclaimed Augustus in York in 306 AD.

Due to increasing demands for accommodation, two new colleges have been built on the University's East Campus. The first, opened in 2021 is named after Anne Lister and the second is named after David Kato.

In November 2024, the presidents and chairs of all of the colleges wrote an open letter to the university's vice chancellor, expressing the fear that "York’s collegiate system, and the people (both staff and students) who work so hard within it are becoming increasingly devalued" among the financial crisis facing British universities. The letter contained three demands: a statement from the university recognising the importance of the colleges; a commitment to better communication, including the reinstatement of regular meetings between the colleges chairs and presidents and universe senior leadership; and consultation with the colleges before any future changes that would have significant impact on them. In a response sent later that month, the vice chancellor stated that "The Collegiate system is of strategic importance to the University. The distinctive character of each college – rooted in the student-led initiatives, contributions, and spirit of each community – remains central to the University’s identity, and we are committed to preserving and celebrating that uniqueness." He also committed to reinstating the twice-yearly meetings between the colleges and university leadership, which would include conversations about potential changes, but said that formal consultation might not always be possible.

== Lists of colleges ==
Name	Foundation	Location	Named after
Derwent College	1965	Campus West	River Derwent
Langwith College	1965	Campus East (Note: Originally based on Heslington West, Langwith moved to the Heslington East campus in 2012)	Langwith Common
Alcuin College	1967	Campus West	Alcuin of York, scholar and advisor to Charlemagne
Vanbrugh College	1967	Campus West	Sir John Vanbrugh, designer of Castle Howard
Goodricke College	1968	Campus East (Note: Originally based on Heslington West, Goodricke moved to the Heslington East campus in 2009)	John Goodricke, astronomer
Wentworth College	1972 (Note: Wentworth was refounded in 2001 and became a postgraduate only college.)	Campus West	Thomas Wentworth, 1st Earl of Strafford
James College	1990 (Note: James College was originally postgraduate only, but changed to accept undergraduates in 1993.)	Campus West	Lord James of Rusholme
Halifax College	2002 (Note: Halifax College was originally Halifax Court, but received college status in 2002.)	Campus West	E. F. L. Wood, 1st Earl of Halifax
Constantine College	2014	Campus East	Constantine the Great, Roman emperor
Anne Lister College	2021	Campus East	Anne Lister, Yorkshire landowner and diarist
David Kato College	2022	Campus East	David Kato, Ugandan human rights activist

== Organisation and governance ==
Like other plate glass universities, such as Lancaster, colleges are primarily residence halls as opposed to having the legal status of 'listed bodies' as seen at Oxford and Cambridge. However, the colleges do still have considerable autonomy.

Every college is governed by its own constitution, which designates a college council as its governing body. This is chaired by the Senior College Fellow, and consists of the College Manager, the Deputy College Manager, and representatives of the student membership. Often other non-voting members are included such as college fellows, and college tutors.

Changes to the structure of the colleges starting in September 2015 meant that the previous role of Head of College became part-time, and the full-time role of Assistant Head of College was introduced. In September 2019, this role was renamed to College Manager, with the role of Head of College becoming titled the College Principal. Before it was discontinued, the last colleges with a College Principal were Derwent College, Langwith College, and Vanburgh College.

Following the Colleges Governance Review, in April 2023 the Student Life Committee agreed to discontinue the role of College Principal. College Council would be chaired by the Senior College Fellow, with all colleges who did not already have one now appointing one. College Managers will continue to have operational responsibility for the college, and will serve as the Executive Officer of the Council. In November 2023, the College Constitution was suitably updated.

== College life ==
=== Representation ===
The day-to-day running of the colleges is managed by an elected committee of staff and student members chaired by the college's Senior College Fellow. Colleges have a Junior Common Room for undergraduate students, which is managed by the elected Junior Common Room Committee, and a Graduate Common Room for post-graduate students, as well as a Senior Common Room, which is managed by elected representatives of the college's academic and administrative members.

The only exceptions to this are Wentworth which as a postgraduate only college does not have a Junior Common Room, and Halifax, Constantine, Anne Lister, David Kato, and Goodricke which are run by a College Student Association that represents both undergraduates and postgraduates together. Vanbrugh and Langwith's Junior Common Room Committees are branded as College Student Associations, however both Vanbrugh and Langwith retains a Graduate Common Room and a Senior Common Room and therefore it's CSA plays the same role as the JCRC in the other colleges.

A University of York Students' Union (YUSU) referendum proposing the formation of College Student Associations passed in 2013. This did not change the structure of student representation in the colleges however, as the colleges are independent of YUSU and therefore any change in the way representation is organised would require a college referendum. No college has changed its status (Halifax having already had a CSA, and Constantine only being founded after the referendum), with Wentworth and Vanbrugh being the only colleges to have held a referendum on changing to a Student Association which resulted in a no vote.

Junior Common Rooms and Student Associations are each different in composition, but are broadly headed by an 'Executive Committee' made up of a Chair/President, Vice Chair/Presidents, Secretary, and Treasurer who have signatory powers. Below the executive committee are the rest of the members of the committees who have responsibilities for welfare, activities, events and the general running of the committee.

=== Social activities ===
The colleges are responsible for many of the social activities of their members, and each JCRC/CSAC organises the 'Fresher's Week' activities for its college. Another central role is the appointment of STYCs (an abbreviation for Second and Third Year Contacts) who are returning students who are responsible for looking after new first years.

Intercollegiate sport is one of the main activities of the colleges. Currently there are 21 leagues with weekly fixtures, in addition a number of one day events are organised as well. The results of the leagues and the one-day events are combined to determine the winner of the 'College Cup', in the 2013/14 standings James College won, with Derwent College coming second, and Alcuin College coming third.

In 2014, College Varsity was created which is held between York's colleges and the colleges of Durham University. York hosted the first tournament which was won by Durham's colleges. Since then the host university has alternated, though the 2021 event was canceled due to COVID-19 pandemic.

== See also ==
- Colleges of the University of Cambridge
- Colleges of Durham University
- Colleges of the University of Oxford
