= Halifax College, York =

College of the University of York, England

Coordinates: 53.94154°N 1.04669°W

Halifax College
- University of York
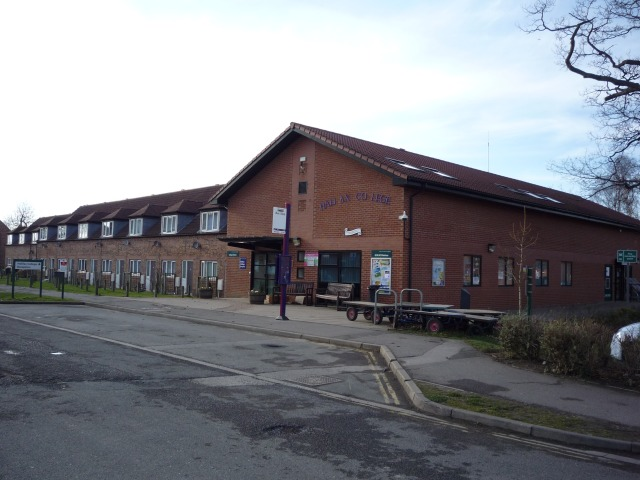
- Halifax College porters lodge
- Location: Heslington West, York
- Motto in English: Scholarship, Activity and Community
- Established: 1996 – as Halifax Court; 2001 – as Halifax College
- Named for: Lord Halifax
- Sister colleges: The County College, Lancaster (2015 – present); Van Mildert College, Durham (2012 – present)
- College Manager: Jenny Underhill
- Undergraduates: 2,220 (2022/2023)
- Postgraduates: 450 (2022/2023)
- Mascot: Faxy the Lion
- Website: Halifax College

Halifax College is a constituent college of the University of York. Founded in 2001, the college was named after Edward Wood, 1st Earl of Halifax and is the largest college at York by number of students.

The college is situated to the south of the main campus, next to the village of Heslington and the university sports fields. The college is linked between both main university campuses via the UB1 shuttle bus.

In 2006/07, Halifax College won the university's College Sport Championship; and successfully held onto the title in the 2007/08 and 2008/09 seasons. They regained the title in the 2010/11 season.

== History ==
In the 1990s the university began to rapidly expand, almost doubling in size from 4,300 to 8,500 students; the expansion of student numbers resulted in the creation of more accommodation by the university which was named Halifax Court. The first blocks of Halifax College which formed Ingram, Irwin, Younger, Lindley and Wood Courts were built in the summer of 1996. The members of Halifax Court were members of other colleges however soon formed their own Junior Common Room; the lack of any tie between the campus, colleges, and the houses in Halifax Court led the members form their own Junior Common Room and to demands that Halifax Court be given full college status. In 2002 Halifax Court was made a full College of the university and was renamed as 'Halifax College'.

The location of the buildings – at the back of the existing (1970s built) St Lawrence Court (used at the time almost exclusively for post-graduate and foreign students) – meant that even the student union paid little attention to the students, despite them forming the largest group at the university.

Halifax Court residents were the first to pay differential rents on their accommodation and lets were a mandatory 38 weeks. All others students, whether in the newer James College blocks or the very dated Derwent blocks paid the same rate. Despite this, accommodation in Halifax in 1997 was £38 a week – £6 more than the rest of campus but still one of the lowest rents in the country.

The campaign for full status was delayed primarily because of the insistence of the Dean of Halifax Court, Mark Evans and the Junior Common Room Committee (JCRC) that Halifax Court should have all the facilities of a campus college. At that time, the Halifax Court Centre Building (now JJ's) consisted of a central common room (unlicensed though clearly built with the concept of housing a bar), the only part-time portering service (Geoff the porter) at the university (every other college had 24hr portering at that time), an adjacent laundry room accessed from the outside (now the lounge area of JJ's), and a small convenience store accessed from the outside (now the pizzeria). The building of today is almost unrecognisable from that of this time.

The lack of desire for a common room (it was very rarely used) and the need for a bar led to the construction of a new building housing the portering service and the shop and the complete refurbishment of the Halifax Court Centre Building into JJ's. The area now occupied by the newer Ainsty and Hickleton Courts (next to the car park) was a large 'village green' for the Halifax Court/College residents. During the summer term this was frequently full of students playing frisbee, having barbecues (strongly against the wishes of the university administration) and studying together.

In 2009 Halifax College changed its college crest from its original blue and white shield to a newer crest derived from the coat of arms of Lord Halifax while maintaining the college's traditional colour.

== Buildings and services ==
Unlike the other Colleges, Halifax does not consist of a main building divided into blocks and corridors. Instead, students live in houses which are grouped together to form courts. There are nine Courts in Halifax: St Lawrence Court, Lindley Court, Wood Court, Ingram Court, Irwin Court, Younger Court, Ainsty Court, and Hickleton Court. Ainsty and Hickleton Courts are managed by UPP Projects Ltd as part of the University Partnership Programme. They were built and originally maintained by Jarvis plc. College members with families also live in 'Garrowby Way', an area of housing which is part of Halifax College. McHugh Lane was its first new-build accommodation. The other Courts are managed by the college and the university's Accommodation Office. St Lawrence court is the largest court.

JJ's used to be the Halifax College bar and pizzeria. It is believed to have been named after two former College Sports Officers, named John and John, who won a competition to name the new bar. JJ's is now a well-equipped and comfortable common room, the largest on campus.

== Mascot ==
'FAXY the Lion', the official Halifax mascot introduced in summer 2012, by the HCSA, represents the college at most campus events supporting college sports teams across the university.

== Associated Institutions ==
In keeping with the tradition of Oxbridge Colleges being twinned with each other, since 2012 Halifax College has been twinned with Van Mildert College, Durham, Durham University and since 2015 with The County College, Lancaster University.

== Student life ==
=== Student representation ===
Halifax College students are represented by the Halifax College Students' Association (HCSA), which represents all students of the college. Halifax was the first College at York to have combined graduate and undergraduate student association. It was also the first to have a 'President' leading the HCSA (unlike the other colleges at the time who had the position of 'Chair').

The 2026 HCSA Executive Committee is:

- President - Rico Ramos
- Vice President of Events and Services - Bethany Cromie
- Vice President for Wellbeing and Liberation - Kit Radcliffe
- Vice President for Sports and Activities - Thomas Cross
- Treasurer - Sameen Baqa
- Secretary - Louis Miller

The Students' Association provides Halifaxers with a variety of services, including large events, student welfare, volunteering, charity work, recycling, college merchandise, college sports and representation to the college and University. It also organises the College Freshers' Fortnight.

Halifax was the first college at York to offer certified Fairtrade College merchandise and continues to stay on top of many issues.

=== Social events ===
Halifax College hosts and organises social events such as barcrawls through York, quizzes in JJ's, court BBQs, trips to various cities or the beach (“Fax off to Scarborough”, anyone?).

In early 2012 the HCSA led by George Offer re-launched XTRA branded events, presenting the college's famous bar crawls and themed club nights in college.

Halifax Summer Ball is held each year, which in the academic year 2010–2011 was held on a boat, Snow Ball, 'Faxival', Halifax Has Got Talent, and 'Freshers Week which changes in content and length from year to year.

Faxival, is a festival/carnival held throughout the college. Including live music, BBQs, hog roast, a bar, inflatables etc. It was started in 2011.
