= Efird =

Efird is a surname. Notable people with the surname include:

- Cynthia Efird (born 1950), American diplomat and ambassador
- David Efird (born 1974), American lecturer, philosopher, and priest
