= University of York Restore Britain Society =

University political society

University of York Reform Society
- Formation: May 2026
- Type: University political society
- Location: University of York

The University of York Restore Britain Society is a student association founded in 2026 at the University of York. It is affiliated with the University of York Students' Union.

== History ==
The society was founded in May 2026 by Nye Gollings, who had been the president of the university's Reform Society. They were the second Restore Britain university society to be ratified in the country, and the first at a Russel Group university.

The creation of the society was expected to be met with backlash, so the student union had to pre-emptively publish a document explaining that it was legally required to allow it. The ratification lead to student protests at the offices of the student union. These amounted to 70 protesters, with 20 members of the society staging a counter-protest close by. A range of societies, including York Green Party and Duck Society, issued a joint statement in opposition to the decision to ratify, with FemSoc highlighting that the society was able to exist independent of the student union, so affiliation is tantamount to endorsement. The formation of the society merited British Archaeology Jobs and Resources raising concerns over the agenda of the society, and presented evidence regarding the multi-racial history of Britain that archaeology teaches.

The society dismissed left-wing attacks on it as misconstrued, based on misreading their affection for English culture and national identity as detesting any other cultures.

An early event the society held was a Detain and Deport themed social, which drew criticism. The society defended itself on the grounds that this is simply their views, and that others were choosing to be offended, although Nye did concede that the name was a 'touch too inflammatory'.
