= Joanna Moorhead =

British journalist and author

Joanna Moorhead is a British journalist and author who writes for The Guardian, The Independent, The Observer and many other UK newspapers and magazines. Her book The Surreal Life of Leonora Carrington gained reviews in The Guardian, The New Yorker, The Times, The Financial Times, Press and Journal, The Herald (Glasgow), The Spectator and Irish Examiner. A second book on Carrington - Surreal Spaces - exploring the homes, houses and institutions she lived in during her journeys from England to Mexico was published June 2023 (UK) and August 2023 (North America) The Art Newspaper .

She is a fellow of West Dean College. She has curated/joint curated exhibitions on Leonora Carrington including, most recently, Leonora Carrington: Rebel Visionary.

She attended the University of York, where she was a member of Goodricke College.
