= David Efird =

American philosopher and Anglican priest (1974–2020)

The Reverend David Efird
- Born: David Hampton Efird; May 18, 1974; Raleigh, North Carolina, US
- Died: 9 January 2020 (aged 45); York, England United Kingdom
- Occupations: Philosopher, academic and clergyman
- Title: Senior lecturer in Philosophy

Academic background
- Education: Duke University; Princeton Theological Seminary; University of Edinburgh; University of Oxford
- Thesis: Unfenced existence (2002)
- Doctoral advisor: Timothy Williamson

Academic work
- Discipline: Philosophy
- Sub-discipline: Philosophy of religion Philosophy of language Metaphysics; Social epistemology Theological ethics Philosophical theology
- Institutions: University of York; Vanbrugh College, York; James College, York

David Hampton Efird (May 18, 1974 – January 9, 2020) was an American philosopher and Anglican priest. As an academic, he specialised in the philosophy of language and the philosophy of religion.

Efird worked at the University of York from 2002. He was a lecturer between 2002 and 2007, and was a senior lecturer from 2007 until his death. He was head of two of York's colleges: Provost of Vanbrugh College, York from 2008 to 2013, and Principal of James College, York from 2013 to 2020.

Efird was a Church of England priest. He was ordained a deacon in 2010 and to the priesthood in 2011. He was a Minor Canon of York Minster, where he served his curacy. He later served as an assistant curate of the Parish of St. Mary Bishophill, an Anglo-Catholic parish in the City of York.

Efird died suddenly on January 9, 2020, in York, United Kingdom, aged 45.

== Early life and education ==
Efird was born on May 18, 1974, in Raleigh, North Carolina, United States. He studied at Duke University and graduated with a Bachelor of Arts (AB) degree in 1995. He then studied theology at Princeton Theological Seminary, a seminary associated with the Presbyterian Church (USA), and graduated with a Master of Divinity (M.Div.) degree in 1998. Having moved to the United Kingdom, he studied at the University of Edinburgh and graduated with a Master of Science (MSc) degree in 1999. He then undertook postgraduate research at the University of Oxford under the supervision of Professor Timothy Williamson. He completed his Doctor of Philosophy (DPhil) degree in 2002. His doctoral thesis was titled "Unfenced existence: the logic and metaphysics of necessary beings".

== Career ==
=== Academic career ===
In 2002, Efird joined the University of York (in York, England) as a lecturer in philosophy. He was promoted to senior lecturer in 2007. He taught metaphysics, social epistemology, theological ethics, and philosophical theology.

Efird was involved in the leadership of two of York's colleges and was also a head of college twice. From 2003 to 2008, he was Dean of Vanbrugh College, York. From 2008 to 2013, he was Provost of Vanbrugh. From 2013 to 2017, he was Principal of James College, York.

Efird served as an assistant editor of the journal Mind.

=== Ordained ministry ===
In 2008, Efird began training for the priesthood with the Yorkshire Ministry Course. He was ordained in the Church of England as a deacon in 2010. On 19 June 2011, he was ordained as a priest by John Sentamu, Archbishop of York, during a service at York Minster. From 2010 to 2013, he served his curacy at York Minster where he was also Vicarius Canonicorum (a type of Minor Canon). From 2013 until his death, he was a non-stipendiary priest and assistant curate in the Parish of St. Mary Bishophill, an Anglo-Catholic parish in the City of York. The parish includes St Mary's Church and St Clement's Church.
