= University Radio York =

Coordinates: 53.9482°N 1.054°W

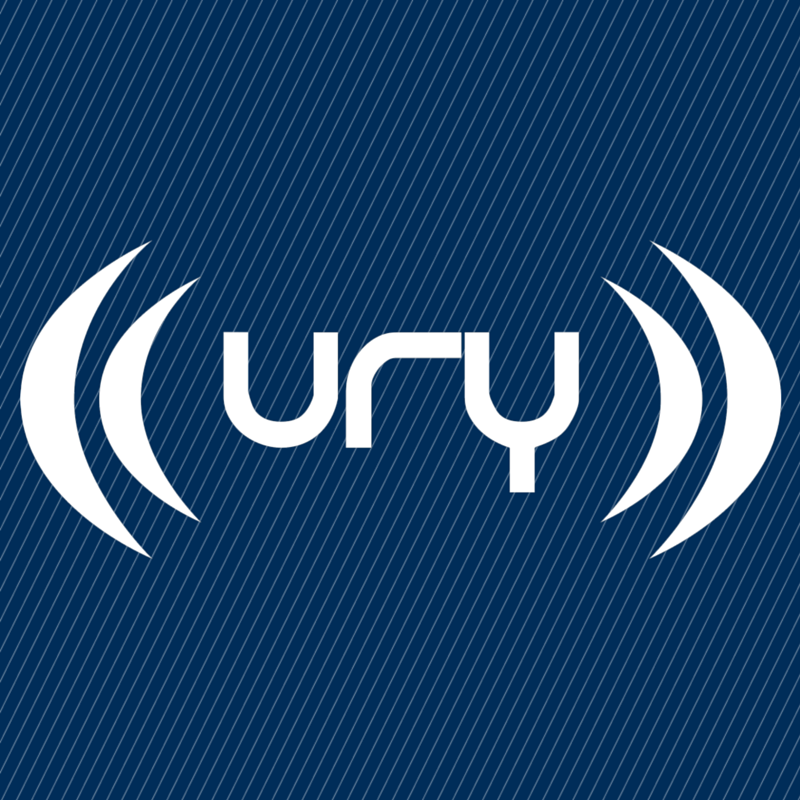
- York, England; England
- Frequencies: FM: 88.3 MHz (restricted to cover the University's campuses); DAB: Band 8B (York)

Programming
- Format: University Radio
- Affiliations: University of York; Student Radio Association; York University Media; Nouse (newspaper); York Vision (newspaper)

Ownership
- Owner: York SU
- Sister stations: YSTV (television)

History
- First air date: 1968
- Former frequencies: 999 kHz; 1350 kHz

Links
- Webcast: Live stream online and iTunes
- Website: ury.org.uk

University Radio York (commonly known as URY) is a University Radio station covering the campuses of the University of York. It was the first legal independent radio station in the United Kingdom. Broadcasting from Vanbrugh College on the University's west campus, URY has won a number of awards from various organisations including the Student Radio Association of which it is a member.

== About ==
Like most student radio stations, University Radio York is run entirely by volunteers, all students studying at the University of York. The station broadcasts 24 hours a day. Most programming is created during term time, outside of which broadcasting falls to a sustainer service. The schedule is made up of a variety of shows including entertainment, news, speech, drama and music. With a new intake of students each academic year, the station's output can change significantly.

== History ==
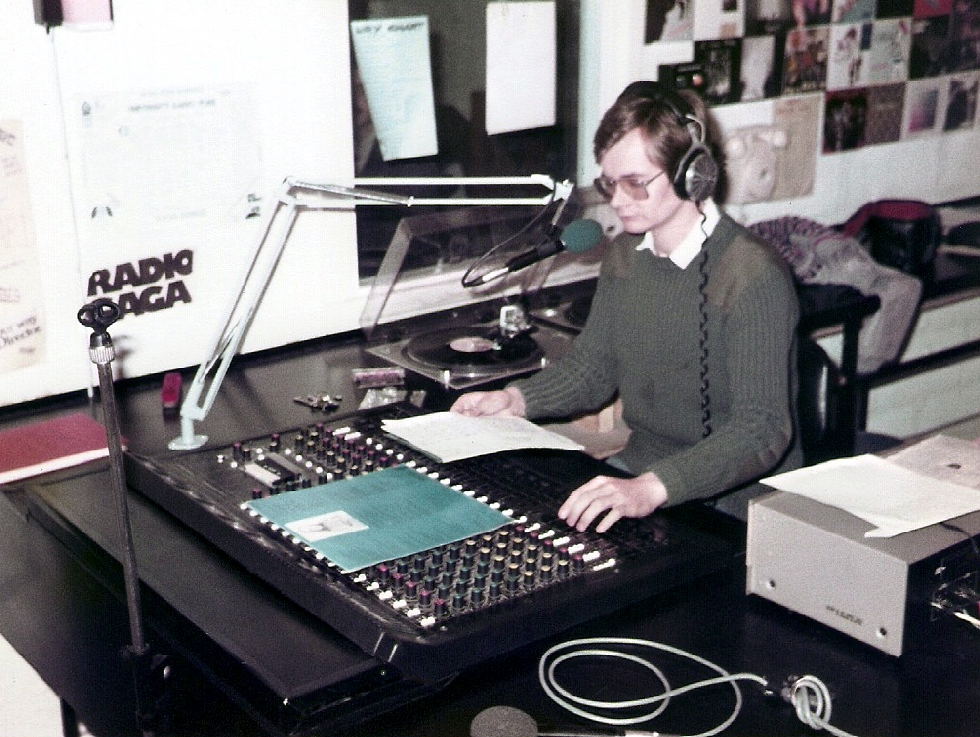
Studio 2 in operation in 1984

In 1967, Mike Greasley then a student of the university, obtained a testing and development license for "Radio Heslington".

The other limitations were strategically overcome and in 1969 the name Radio York not being available, University Radio York was licensed, becoming the first station independent of the BBC to broadcast legally in the UK. The station launch was a joint show with BBC local radio station and featured a guest broadcast by DJ John Peel.

The station switched from its original 999 kHz induction loop system to a LPAM licence in 1999, which broadcast across both of The University of York's Heslington West and Heslington East campuses on 1350 AM. The station has also conducted several restricted service licence (RSL) FM broadcasts across the whole of the city, the last of these being in 2008.

Initially the station's purpose was to broadcast current affairs, and programmes of general interest in the arts and sciences as well as popular music, however the output is now mainly entertainment-based, with additional specialist arts and speech programming. News was provided by The Student Broadcast Network until its demise however, the station's long-running news programme URY Newshour (previously York 60 and York Report) at 6pm is still a pivotal part of the weekly schedule.

In 2008, URY broadcast 12 hours of US Presidential Election coverage. Scott Bryan served as Programme Controller, Station Manager and Head of Training at URY between 2008–10.

The URY Marathon was broadcast in March 2013 for 40 hours in aid of Macmillan Cancer Support. At the time of broadcast, it was URY's longest show ever. The two presenters, William Chalk and Tom Edwards, and one newsreader, Ben Bason, broadcast without sleep for the duration, raising over £1,800.

In autumn 2013, the chief engineer and assistant chief engineers of the time (Stephen Clarke, Thomas Haines and Andrew Durant) started a project to completely overhaul the internal audio systems of URY. The main aim of this was to remove the 'URY hum' – a low level buzz starting at 50 Hz with subsequent harmonics which filled the entire audio range. Following Alumni grant and crowd funding, and with the support of Focusrite Audio Engineering, the team was able to upgrade all studio interconnects to be digital, using Focusrite's RedNet system on the Audio Over IP protocol, Dante. In September 2015, URY was able to begin broadcasting a 'hum-less' stream. The project was nominated for a Student Radio Award in October 2016.

URY's longest show at the time, URY 101, was broadcast in June 2016 for 101 hours in aid of Yorkshire Cancer Research. The show was presented by Joe Willis, Naomi Gildert and Caterina Soave, and produced by Adam Brain, Peter Rogers, Stephen Clarke and Andrew Durant. They each took shifts to ensure the broadcast continued, with the presenters getting three 7 hour sleeps over the 4 days and the producers working for 6 hours each. The entire show was done as an Outside Broadcast, from Greg's Place on the University of York campus. The total raised was £1710 (including £1,188.16 donated online), and the show included live music, a broadcast from the campus lake and a whole host of games and challenges. It was completed as part of Yorkshire Cancer Research's '100 for £100' campaign.

In 2018, URY were awarded a grant by the University of York of £40,000 to upgrade their studios. This included brand new audio equipment, a total interior re-design, and fancy red/blue colour schemes to match. The 40K project was completed in Christmas 2019.

In September 2021, URY started broadcasting on 88.3 MHz FM as part of Ofcom's Limited Coverage FM trial. The next year, in September 2022, URY was awarded a limited license to continue broadcasting on 88.3 FM until 31 August 2027.

Transmissions on 1350 kHz AM ceased on 25 June 2023 following 135 hours of consecutive broadcast, URY's longest show to date.

In June 2024, URY was issued a Community Radio License to broadcast on DAB across the city of York.

== Achievements and awards ==
=== Founding - 2009 ===
In 1988, URY won a BBC Radio 1 / NASB award in News and Current Affairs for its coverage of the 1987 UK general election in York and surrounding constituencies despite one of their correspondents, Peter Gordon being unwell at one of the counts. The election in that constituency was notable due to 2 recounts taking place over the six and a half hours.

URY won the Student Radio Association / BBC Radio 1 Student Radio Station of the Year Award for the first time in its history in 2005. This was also the first time the station had even been nominated for a Student Radio Award. URY's Programme Controller at the time, Matt Wareham, was also nominated for the Best Station Sound category in the same year, but did not receive an award.

As part of the prize for winning Student Radio Station of the Year, on 29 May 2006 URY was broadcast on BBC Radio 1, taking over the 4 to 7 am Early Breakfast slot usually occupied by Jason King and Joel Ross. The show was broadcast nationally on 97–99 FM and DAB, across the USA on Sirius Satellite Radio and online through the BBC Radio 1 website. It was also made available by both URY and BBC Radio 1 on their websites.

At the same awards in 2008, Rob Watts won bronze for best male presenter, URY Breakfast with Rob Watts and Steve Gardner won bronze for best entertainment programme, Rob Watts interviewing Greg Dyke won gold for best interview and The Technical Difficulties won the Kevin Greening Creativity Award.

At the Student Radio Awards in 2009, The Technical Difficulties won bronze for best entertainment programme, Joshua Chambers' interview: "Hilary Benn on Binyam Mohamed" won gold for best interview and York Report won gold for best journalistic programming.

=== 2010s ===
2010 was another successful year for URY at the Student Radio Awards, where they picked up two accolades. For the second year running, the URY News Team were award-winning by getting Silver for Best Journalistic Programming and also CoCo Cole managed to win the Silver Best Female award.

In 2011 URY received six nominations at the Student Radio Awards. Four of these were successful: The Chalk and Charles Show won Gold Best Entertainment Show, James Bugg's The More Beautiful Game won Bronze Best Speech. On top of this, URY picked up Silver Best Station and The Kevin Greening Award for Tess Humphrey's Prince of Humberside.

In the 2012 Student Radio Awards, URY received seven nominations; for Best Station, Best Female, Best Specialist Music Programming, Best Journalistic Programming, Best Technical Achievement, Best Speech Programming and Best Interview. For the second year in a row, URY won Silver Best Station behind URN.

At the 2013 Student Radio Awards, URY received nine nominations, with six awards being won on the night – Silver Best Technical Achievement, Gold and Silver awards for Best Speech Programming, with 'Trimble' also being awarded a silver award in the Kevin Greening category, a Bronze Best Entertainment award for 'The Harry Whittaker Show', and a Silver Newcomer award for Harry Whittaker.

URY at the 2014 Student Radio Awards won Silver Best Journalistic Programming, for the News and Sports teams special programme, 'River Safety: York's Rising Problems'. The one-hour special, presented by former Head of News and Sport Ben Bason and produced by News Editors George Lane and Carys Brain, discussed the issue of river safety in York after a number of fatalities in 2014.

At the 2015 I Love Student Radio Awards, URY were shortlisted for 4 awards, 2 in Best Audience Initiative for Freshers 2014 and YorkNext, Best Outreach Project for Alex and Tom: Getting gold for Charity and Outstanding Contribution to Student Radio for Jay Glover. The Freshers 2014 marketing and OB setup ended up winning the overall prize for Best Audience Initiative. In 2015, URY won 5 SRA Awards at the 20th Anniversary Awards ceremony – Bronze Best Male (Harry Whittaker), Gold Best Entertainment (The Harry Whittaker Show), Silver Best Event (Elections Results Night 2015), Gold Best Newcomer (Rebecca Saw) and Silver Best Technical Achievement (Roses Mini-OB Kits). The station was also nominated for Best Sports with the York Sport Report. URY Alumni Ben Bason also won Silver Best Entertainment for his show of Forge Radio.

2016 saw URY receive 7 nominations for the Student Radio Awards. These were: Best Live Event or Outside Broadcast, for the 101 Hour Charity Broadcast; Best Technical Achievement, for 'Beat the Buzz'; Best Speech Programming, for After the Tone; Best Entertainment Programme, URY:PM with K-Spence; Best Multiplatform Initiative, URY Music; Best Station Branding; Best Female, Kat Spencer. Of these, 2 awards were won: 'Beat the Buzz' received Gold in the Best Technical Achievement category, and URY received Bronze for Best Station Branding (Alex Light and Nick Upton).

In 2017 URY won four awards out of five nominations at the Student Radio Awards. Joshua Kerr was nominated for the Best Male category, and the station's Visualisation project was nominated for Best Technical Achievement, for which it won Bronze. Kat Spencer took home Gold in Best Entertainment Programme for 'URY:PM – with K-Spence', and URY received two medals in the Best Newcomer category, with Matt Stratford winning the Silver award and Will Batchelor going home with the Gold.

In 2018, URY won two gold and two silver awards. The URSPY APP won Gold Best Technical Achievement, Gold Best Multiplatform Initiative and the Silver Kevin Greening Creativity Award whilst Joel Mitchell won Silver for Best Male.

In 2019, URY won three gold and two silver awards at the Student Radio Awards. The golds were Best Chart Show, Best Newcomer (Kathy Morrall) and Best Female (Hannah Sackville-Bryant). The silvers awarded to URY were for Best Technical (Matt Stratford) and Best Entertainment Program (Joel Mitchell).

=== 2020s ===
In 2020, URY won three gold, three silver and one bronze awards at the Student Radio Awards. The golds were Best Student Radio Station, Best Technical Achievement (WebStudio) and Best Chart Show.

In 2021, URY won two gold and four bronze awards at the Student Radio Awards. The golds were Best Sports Programming (Roses) and Best Chart Show. URY was also named the third Best Student Radio Station by winning bronze in that category.

In 2022, URY won one gold and two bronze awards at the Student Radio Awards. The gold for Best Chart Show Programming and the bronzes for Best Sport Programming (Roses 2022) and Best Technical Achievement (URY on FM).

2023 saw the station win a number of awards. Four golds (Best Chart Show Programming, Best Newcomer, Best Event Programming, Best Specialist Music Programming), one silver (Best Event Programming) and four bronzes (Best Technical Achievement, Best Station Sound, Best Specialist Music Programming, Best Newcomer) making it the most successful year at the SRAs as of 2023.

At the 2024 Student Radio Awards URY matched its number of wins for the previous year with two golds, two silvers and five bronzes.
