= Katherine Low Settlement =

Charity founded in 1924

Coordinates: 51.4720°N 0.1737°W

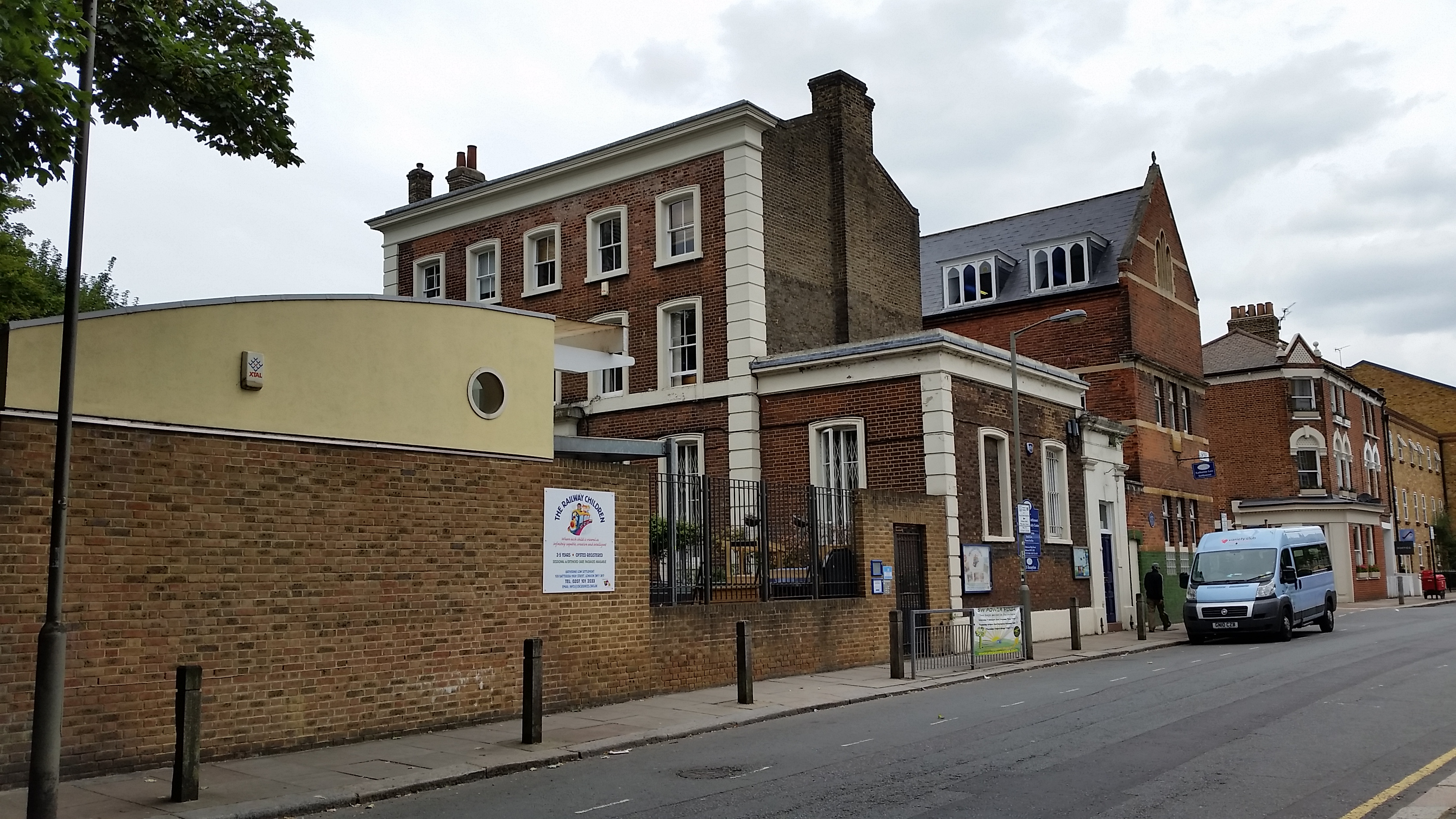
Katherine Low Settlement

The Katherine Low Settlement is a charity founded in 1924 as part of the settlement movement. It is now a listed building and provider of charitable services to the local community in Battersea, South West London.

== History ==
Katherine Mackay Low was born in Georgia, USA, on 9 July 1855. Her parents were British, and when her mother died in 1863, her father, a prosperous merchant and banker, brought his family back to England and settled in Leamington. When he died the family came to London, and Katherine devoted herself to the care of the less fortunate. When she died, on 2 January 1923, her many friends decided to create a memorial to her which would also further the kind of service to which she had devoted herself.

Battersea at the beginning of the 20th century was an industrial and poor part of London, and the area around Orville Road, Green Lane and Battersea High Street was particularly deprived. In 1899 Charles Booth's survey found Orville Road occupied by "thieves, prostitutes, cadgers, loafers", the few decent residents being men with large families driven there "in despair of getting rooms elsewhere".

It soon attracted the attention of social workers, based at Canon Erskine Clarke's clergy house, the Cedars, and from 1906 in the new Cedars Club or Institute adjoining. The mission there foundered after the First World War, when ill-health forced the retirement of its principal, Nesta Lloyd, but in 1921 she passed the baton to Christ's College Boys' Club – an initiative from Christ's College, Cambridge – and followed this up in 1923 by introducing the all-female Katherine Low Settlement to the club as its tenant at the Cedars.

Katherine Low's friends raised the funds, and on 17 May 1924 the Duchess of York (later Queen Elizabeth The Queen Mother) came to Battersea and declared open the Katherine Low Settlement.

== Katherine Low Settlement today ==
KLS is now a multi-purpose charity and community centre. The centre supports after-school projects and a youth club for young people with learning difficulties. For older people there are pensioners lunch club and health group, mental health drop-in and a support group for carers of people with long-term mental health problems. Other supported causes include the young carers' project which offers respite to young people who are caring (often alone) for a parent with disability. KLS plays host to refugees and asylum seekers, home/school support projects, and Sure Start for families with children aged under 4.

== Listed building status ==
Katherine Low Settlement is Grade II listed by Historic England. The building is described as: A symmetrical house of the first third of the 18th century, 5 bays wide, of 3 storeys and of brown brick with stone dressings. It is quoined. On the ground floor the door is recessed behind a surround of Doric piers supporting frieze and cornice. On all floors the windows have shallow cambered heads. The first floor has a cillband. There is a crowning entablature. The stacks have oversailing courses. A single-storey extension with frontage to the street is similarly detailed with one blind and one glazed window and an offset entrance bay finished with a separate entablature. Listing does not include late 19th-century extension.
