= James College, York =

College of the University of York, England

Coordinates: 53.94577°N 1.05501°W

James College
- University of York
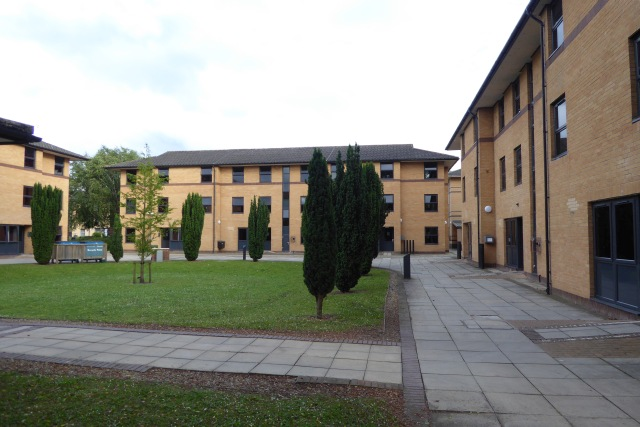
- James College
- Location: Heslington West, York
- Established: 1990
- Named for: Lord James of Rusholme
- College Manager: Georgina Heath
- Undergraduates: 1,885 (2022/2023)
- Postgraduates: 155 (2022/2023)
- Mascot: Long Swan Silver
- Website: James College
- JCR: James JCRC

James College is a college at the University of York in the United Kingdom. It is known as the "Sports College" largely due to its prowess on the Sports field but also has a diversity of events that cater to all tastes. The college crest incorporates a swan with a White Rose of York.

== History ==
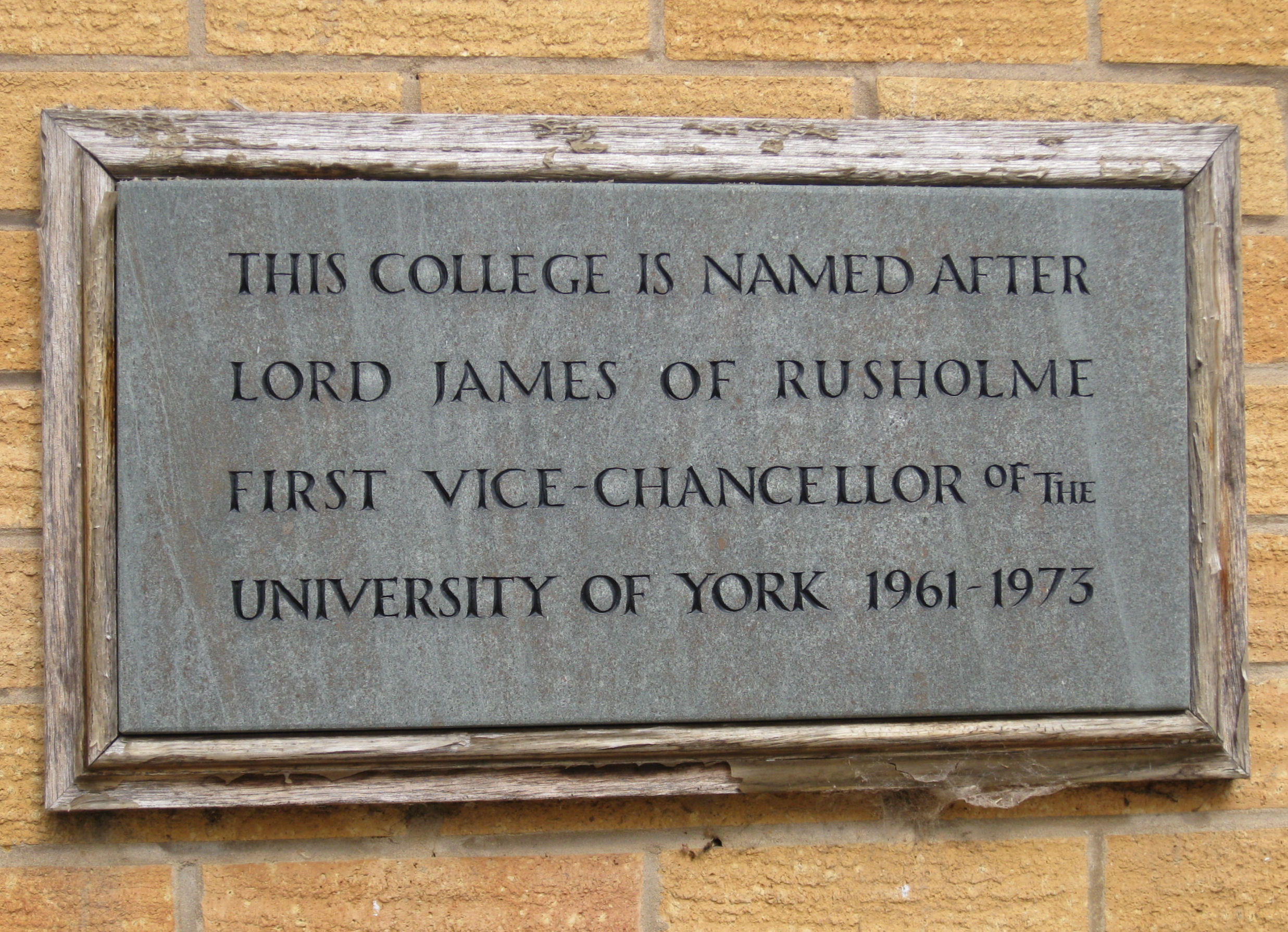
Foundation plaque

James College is named after Lord James of Rusholme, the University of York's first vice-chancellor, and was built in several stages during the 1990s. Initially James was intended to be a postgraduate-only college, however the university began to rapidly expand in size, almost doubling in size from 4,300 to 8,500 students, in 1993, therefore it was decided that the college should become open to undergraduates.

== Buildings and services ==
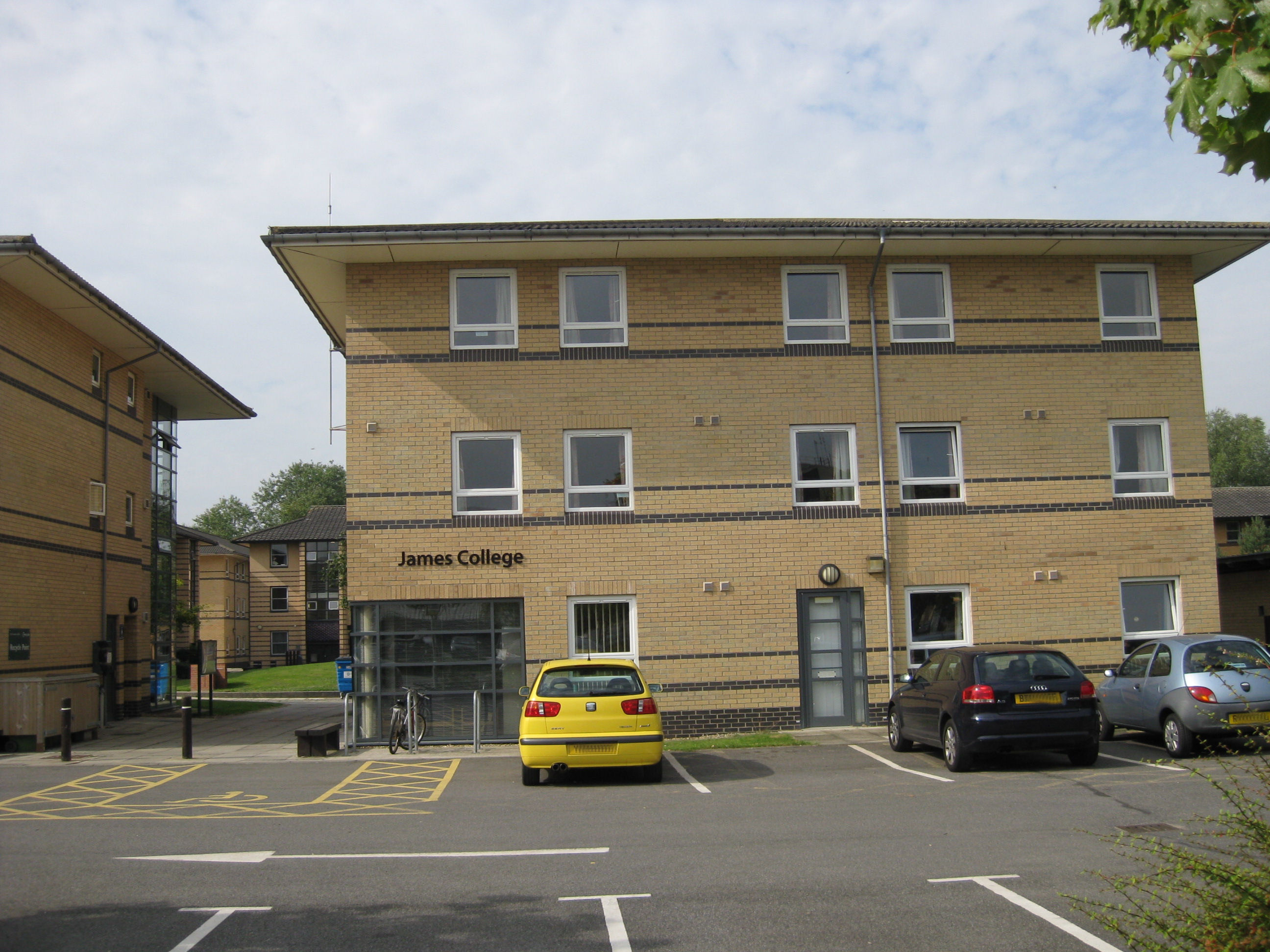
James College

As of 2023, it consists of twelve accommodation blocks lettered from "A" to "M” (missing out "I") located across a cable-stayed bridge from Wentworth College and close to the old Goodricke College buildings and the university's sports centre.

There are three types of accommodation; standard houses, ensuite houses and ensuite flats. Blocks A, B, and C are arranged into houses with a small kitchen on the ground floor. There are 3 houses per block, with 15 people living in each house. Blocks D, E, and F are the older-style ensuite blocks which are also arranged into houses with a kitchen on the ground floor, and have 16 people per house.

Blocks G, H, J, K, L, and M are the newest blocks and all have ensuite rooms, consisting of a 'pod' or wet room containing a shower, toilet and sink. Each block is (generally) divided into 6 flats which have a kitchen per flat. The kitchens are shared between 6 and 9 people. In 2009, James College acquired a block from the former site of Goodricke College which became N block. In 2022, the university decided to withdraw N block from available accommodation. All blocks are catered for breakfast and dinner between Monday-Friday.

James has a number of common rooms including the Lakeside (JCR) and the Lodge, hosts the YorkSU bar 'The Lounge' and is the closest college to the University Sports centre & playing fields.

== Student life ==
The JCRC is the student-run body that manages Freshers Week, weekly events, and formals. The quads have lent themselves to the most famous James College tradition, "Quad Dash". Quad Dash models itself on the film Chariots of Fire. It was the brainchild of the then James College Chair, Fergus Drake. College residents turn out in their hundreds to enjoy a day of sunshine, free beer, quad races, ice cream, bouncy castles and fun. Quad dash took a brief break between 2015-2025 and was revived as "Quad Bash".

The James College Annual Lecture is delivered by a distinguished speaker on a topic of interest to the college. In recent years these have included:

2010 – Duncan Petrie – 'The Swinging Sixties'

2011 – Steve Bell, award-winning Guardian Cartoonist

2012 – Fergus Drake, Save the Children,- 'The reality of humanitarian aid in a fragile world'

Within the college, a number of 'Taste' events take place each term, where students and members of the college are invited to introduce others to a taster of their own culture through a presentation, demonstration or media. This is normally accompanied, by traditional cuisine and drinks. Alongside these cultural exchange events, the college runs a unique exchange with Morningside College at the Chinese University of Hong Kong, with students from each institution spending a number of terms or a year at the other. James College and Durham University's Collingwood College enjoy an annual sporting contest and social weekend, with York and Durham taking turns to host the event. James College currently holds the JC Cup, winning a closely fought encounter in Autumn 2012.

James College has two Common Rooms. The Lakeside Common Room is in the A/B/C quad, while James Lodge is in College House, near to the Roger Kirk Centre. The first floor is occupied by Campus West communities staff, the JCRC office is located through the kitchen on the ground floor.

== Sports ==
James is known as the "Sports College" on campus, largely due to its supreme prowess in the Sports field. For the 2026 edition of the Durham College Varsity, James sent six teams to the competition, more than any other College at the university.

== Junior Common Room Committee ==
The JCRC is the student-run body that manages Freshers Week, weekly events, and formals. In 2018, Freshers' Week saw a large focus on Non-Clubbing events as well as the traditional clubbing portfolio.

== Administration ==
Ken Todd was the head of James College from its opening until his retirement in September 2007. Initially the position was titled Provost, but from 2013 this was changed to principal, this has subsequently been changed to head of college. The head of college is a part-time post held by an academic at the university.

List of provosts:

- Mr Ken Todd (1990–2007)
- Dr Neil Lunt (2007–2013)

List of heads/Principals of James College:

- The Revd David Efird (2013–2017)
- Paul Summers (2017–2019)
- Andrew Kerrigan (2019–2020)
- List of deans of James College:
- Mary Macfarlane (2002–2004)
- Christine Hamieh (2004–2006)
- Bernadette Martinez-Hernandez (2006–2008)
- Margaret Hearnden (2008–2011)
- Dan Horsfall (2011–2013)
