= University of York Students' Union =

Representative student body at the University of York

- Founded: 1963
- Headquarters: The Student Centre, James College, York
- Area served: University of York
- Key people: Yeme Onoabhagbe (CEO); Lewis Parrey (Union Affairs Officer)
- Revenue: £4,181,483 (2021)
- Members: approximately 20,000 (15,000 full-time equivalent)
- Number of employees: 156 (2018, 2019)
- Website: yorksu.org

University of York Students' Union (York SU, formerly YUSU) is the representative body for the students at the University of York, England. It provides representation for all students, is the key provider of entertainment and welfare services, and operates a range of commercial ventures including a cafe bar and events & marketing department. Lewis Parrey is the current Union Affairs Officer (head of the union).

York SU is responsible for representing and campaigning for students to the university, for example over improved facilities such as a 24-hour library.

== History ==
Tom Scott was elected as president under the persona of 'Mad Cap'n Tom', wearing the tradition pirate costume during campaigning, in 2008.

== Services ==
=== Events ===
Most regular late night events are run by college Junior Common Room committees in the campus bars; however the union provides support to individual college Entertainments reps, through providing training, health and safety advice, and acts as a representative to university Catering and Bar Management, as well as to other venues in York city. The Union runs Late Licence events in The Courtyard on a Saturday night; and organises a variety of cross Campus events including the Freshers and Graduation Balls.

=== Welfare ===
The Union provides an individual casework service, as well as running campaigns on specific issues such as sexual health or academic integrity.

=== Student Action and RAG ===
The Union runs various "Student Action" projects which aim to provide student development, while giving something back to the local community. One of the major project it runs is an annual 'Kids Camp' which is a residential holiday for Underprivileged children, staffed by volunteers.

=== York Sport Union ===
The Union funds and supports a number of sports clubs, which compete with other universities in leagues such as BUCS. It also organizes the annual Roses Tournament which takes place against Lancaster University.

== Venues ==
The student union currently operates six venues, spread between five on Campus West and one on Campus East. For a short time during 2021 the union also operated an outside venue called The Lakeside Tap in order to remain open due to Covid restrictions. It has since closed indefinitely.

=== Locations ===
- Courtyard: Located within Derwent College
- D-Bar: Located within Derwent College
- Glasshouse: Located within Langwith College
- Kitchen: Located at the Seebohm Rowntree building
- Lounge: Located within James College
- Vanburgh Arms: Located within Vanbrugh College

== Societies ==
As of 2023 there are more than 200 student run societies and over 60 sports clubs. Societies are managed by the Societies Committee which is responsible for the creation of new societies as well as the allocation of funding and is currently made up of 9 members.

== New Student Centre ==
Co-designed by ADP Architecture and O'Donnell + Tuomey the project is a part of a larger redevelopment of University Square. The £35 million building is being designed with the environment in mind, being built mainly of natural materials and housing solar panels to reduce its carbon footprint. The site will be home to the relocated offices of Nouse and URY as well as social spaces spread across five floors with the 5th floor housing a rooftop bar. The project was initially planned to be completed in the 2025/26 academic year, however in January 2024 it was announced the project was to be put on hold for at least 3 years due to the university facing rising costs.

== Sabbatical officers ==
The Union's current sabbatical officer team consists of:

Union Affairs Officer	Lewis Parrey
Union Development Officer	Anna Lindberg
Academic Officer	Aya Haidar
Equality and Inclusion Officer	Abi Harrison
Community & Wellbeing Officer	Sam Dickinson
Activities Officer	Kaitlyn Beattie-Zarb
Sports Officer	Darcy Graham

While resignations are rare, in early 2021, the then Activities Officer, Brian Terry, resigned from his post, citing coronavirus and an offer of long term employment. In late 2024, Ezreal Xie Stepped down from his position as Equality and Inclusion Officer due to changes in personal circumstances

== Financials ==
Year	Income	Spending
2023	£5,770,802	£5,932,697
2022	£5,593,340	£5,452,018
2021	£4,181,483	£3,833,284
2020	£4,391,816	£4,468,226
2019	£5,354,373	£5,305,055
2018	£5,123,390	£5,091,488
