= Common room (university) =

Student organisational body in university colleges and halls

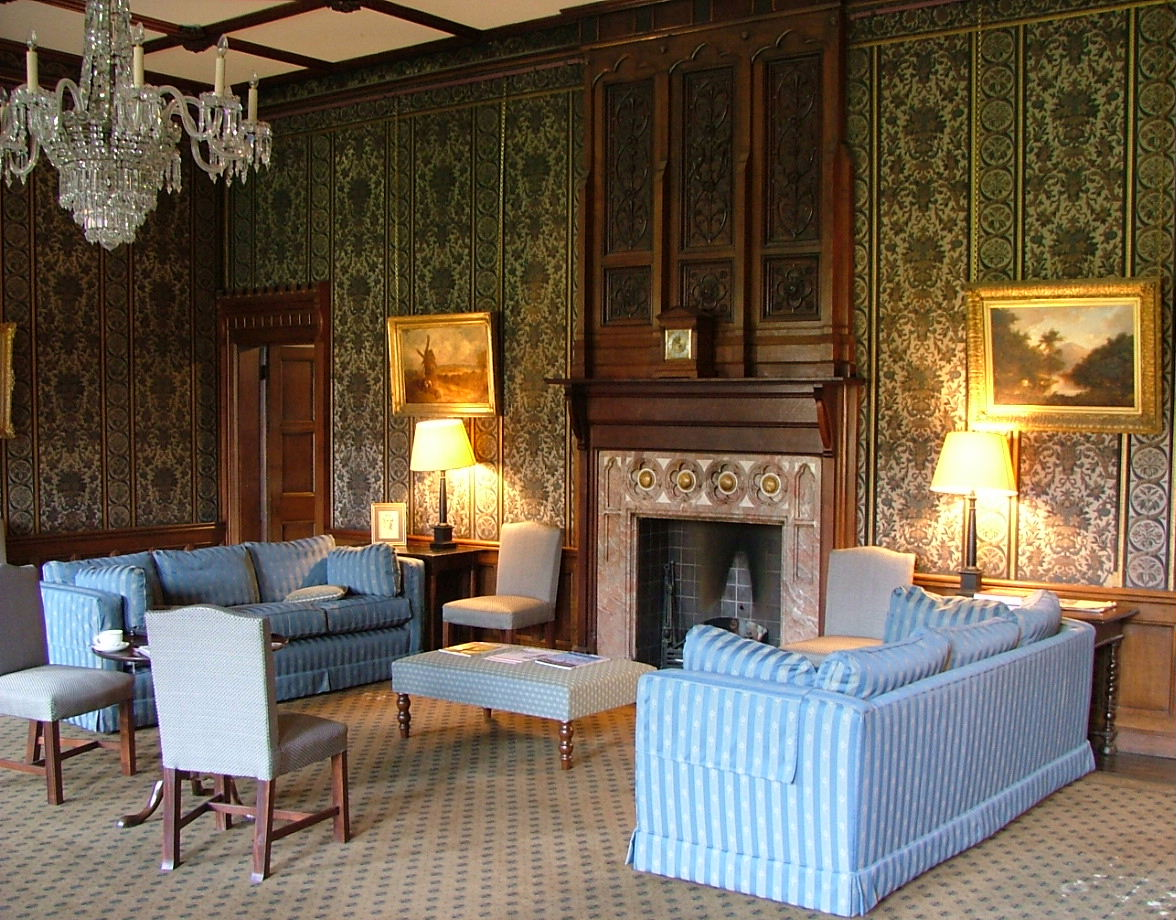
The senior common room at Keble College, University of Oxford, England

A common room is a group into which students (and sometimes the academic body) are organised in some universities, particularly in the United Kingdom, normally in a subdivision of the university such as a college or hall of residence, in addition to an institution-wide students' union. They represent their members within the hall or college, operate certain services within these institutions such as laundry or recreation, and provide opportunities for socialising. There are variations based on institutional tradition and needs, but classically the following common rooms will exist:

- A junior common room (JCR) – for undergraduate students
- A middle common room (MCR) – for postgraduate students (in colleges with a large number of post-graduate students)
- A senior common room (SCR) – for academic members of the college

Common rooms are particularly found at collegiate universities such as Oxford, Cambridge, Durham, York and Lancaster, but can also be found (often only the JCR) at non-collegiate universities, where they are normally associated with halls of residence. A significant difference between colleges and halls of residence generally is that students continue to be members of a college when not resident in the college; thus college JCRs serve all students who are members of the college, whether or not they live in college accommodation, while hall JCRs serve only residents of that hall.

As well as in the UK, organisations known as common rooms are found in universities in Australia, Ghana, Ireland, Singapore and the US. In addition to this, each of the above terms may also refer to an actual common room designated for the use of these groups, and at some universities has only this meaning. At the University of Cambridge, the term combination room (e.g., "junior combination room") is also used, with the same abbreviations.

== United Kingdom ==
Common rooms are found at almost all collegiate universities and in halls at a few non-collegiate universities. Student common rooms may be classified as students' unions under the Education Act 1994. Until the Charities Act 2006, common rooms (and other students' unions) were exempt charities, but under that act and the successor Charities Act 2011 they are now required to register with the Charity Commission if they have an income of £100,000 per annum or higher. As of August 2025, eight common rooms are registered with the commission, all from colleges of Durham University. Like other students' unions, student common rooms may appoint sabbatical officers; this is common at Durham but rare at other universities. As colleges vary in size between universities – the median Durham college had 1385 students in 2024/25, while the median Oxford college had 665 students (and the largest 1345) – so do the sizes of their common rooms.

Common rooms at Oxford, Cambridge and Durham are independent of their central students' unions, but the students' unions at these and the other collegiate universities have mechanisms for communication with the common rooms (or similar college representative body), either through membership of the executive (Roehampton), formal representation in the students' union assembly (Cambridge, Durham, Lancaster) or regular meetings (Oxford, York).

=== JCR president ===
Most JCRs are led by a JCR president, elected by the JCR members, supported by various other elected officers who together form the JCR committee.

The term senior man has been used to refer to this position at some colleges. The term reflects the history of these colleges, which were founded as single-sex, male-only institutions, and remains the only title used for the head of the JCR at Hatfield College, Durham. University College, Durham, also used the title of senior man exclusively until 2015, since when office-holders have been able to choose between senior student, senior man and senior woman. Similarly, Trinity College, Melbourne, also uses the title senior student for their student association president. St Chad's College, Durham, used senior man or senior woman for the head of its JCR until 2018, when this was changed to JCR president. Van Mildert College, Durham, also previously used the term senior man (now JCR president) until at least 1998.

=== Collegiate universities ===
==== Oxford ====
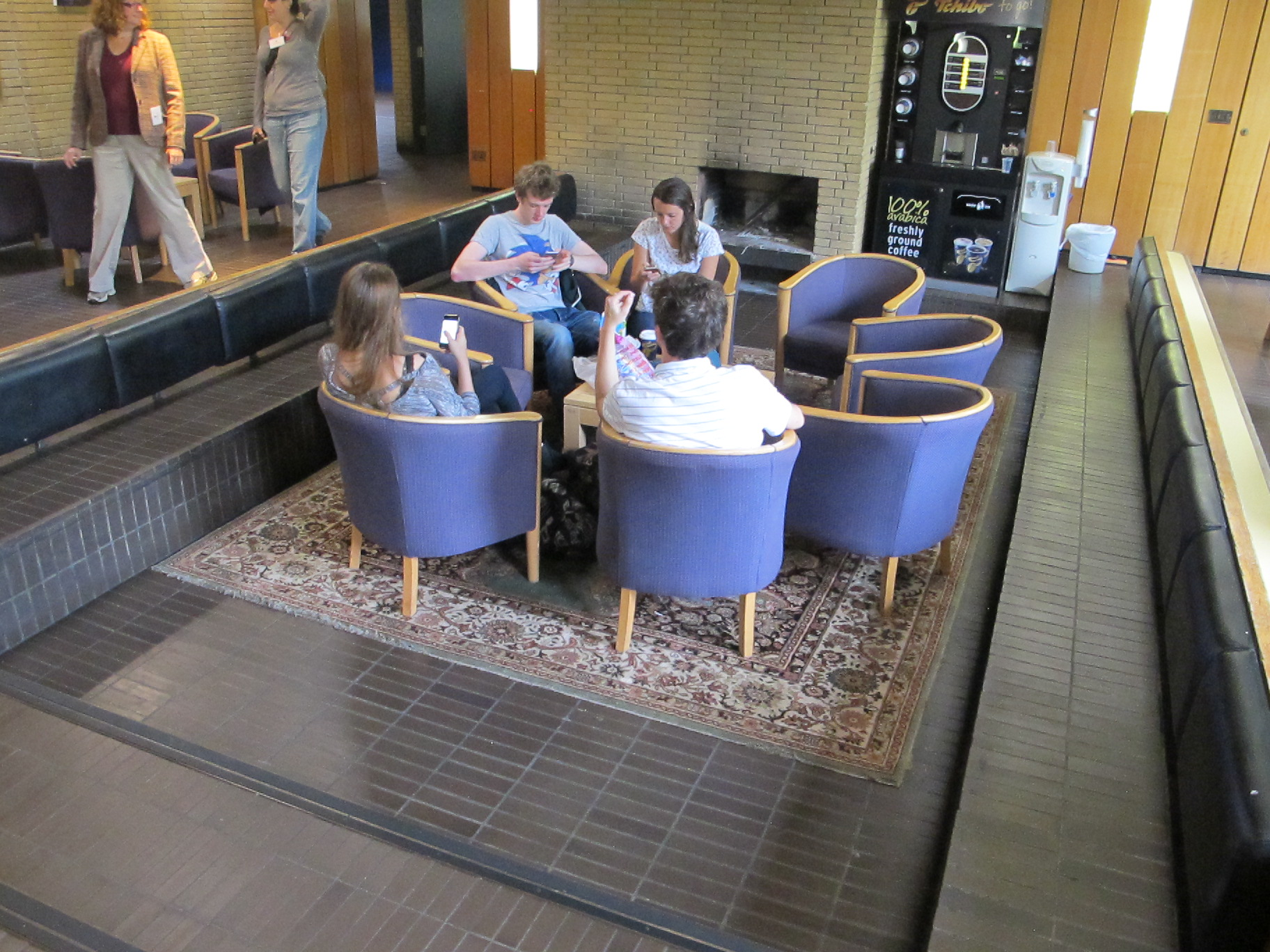
The JCR at St Catherine's College, Oxford

The earliest junior common rooms at the University of Oxford, dating back to the 17th century, were private student clubs, limited to richer students who could afford their membership fees, and known for drinking and debauchery. With the reforms of Oxford in the mid-19th century, there was a crackdown on JCR activities, with Corpus Christi going as far as to disband its JCR in 1852. In 1868, New College moved to dissolve its JCR after a particularly egregious incident. An alternative solution was put forward by Alfred Robinson, a tutor at the college, which saw the JCR come under college oversight and, by including membership in the college battels, making it an inclusive society of all undergraduates in the college. Rather than a rich students' drinking club, the JCR became the centre of undergraduate life and the main point of contact between the college and the undergraduates.

By the end of the 19th century, similar arrangements were put in place at almost all Oxford colleges. When post-graduate numbers increased dramatically in the 1960s, similar arrangements, modelled on the JCRs, were put in place for them in the shape of middle common rooms.

A typical college now has a JCR for undergraduates, an MCR for graduates and an SCR for its fellows. JCRs and MCRs have a committee, with a president and so on, that represent their students to college authorities, the Oxford University Student Union (OUSU), etc., in addition to being an actual room for the use of members. SCRs typically have a president, an academic member of the body who deals with higher-level administrative matters pertaining to the SCR, such as inviting proposed visiting fellows to the body and identifying invited lecturers to any particular college event. SCRs are typically characterised by a copious provision of coffee, newspapers, and moderately informal space for academics to think and discuss ideas.

Following the Charities Act 2006, student common rooms had the option of registering as independent charities or of registering with their college, with some common rooms taking each route. At Magdalen, for example, which was one of the first colleges to complete the process, the JCR voted to become an independent charity, while the MCR registered with the college. St Catherine's JCR "declared independence" from the college authorities in 2015 in protest against financial controls imposed by the college.

There exist several exceptions to the standard common room system. Instead of maintaining a separate JCR and MCR, St Benet's Hall maintained a Joint Common Room (JCR) which jointly represented both undergraduate and graduate students, until the hall's closure in 2022. At Nuffield College, an all-graduate college founded in 1937 before the conception of MCRs, students are members of a JCR. Additionally, although Wadham College maintains a separate JCR and MCR, its entire student population is represented by a combined students' union (SU).

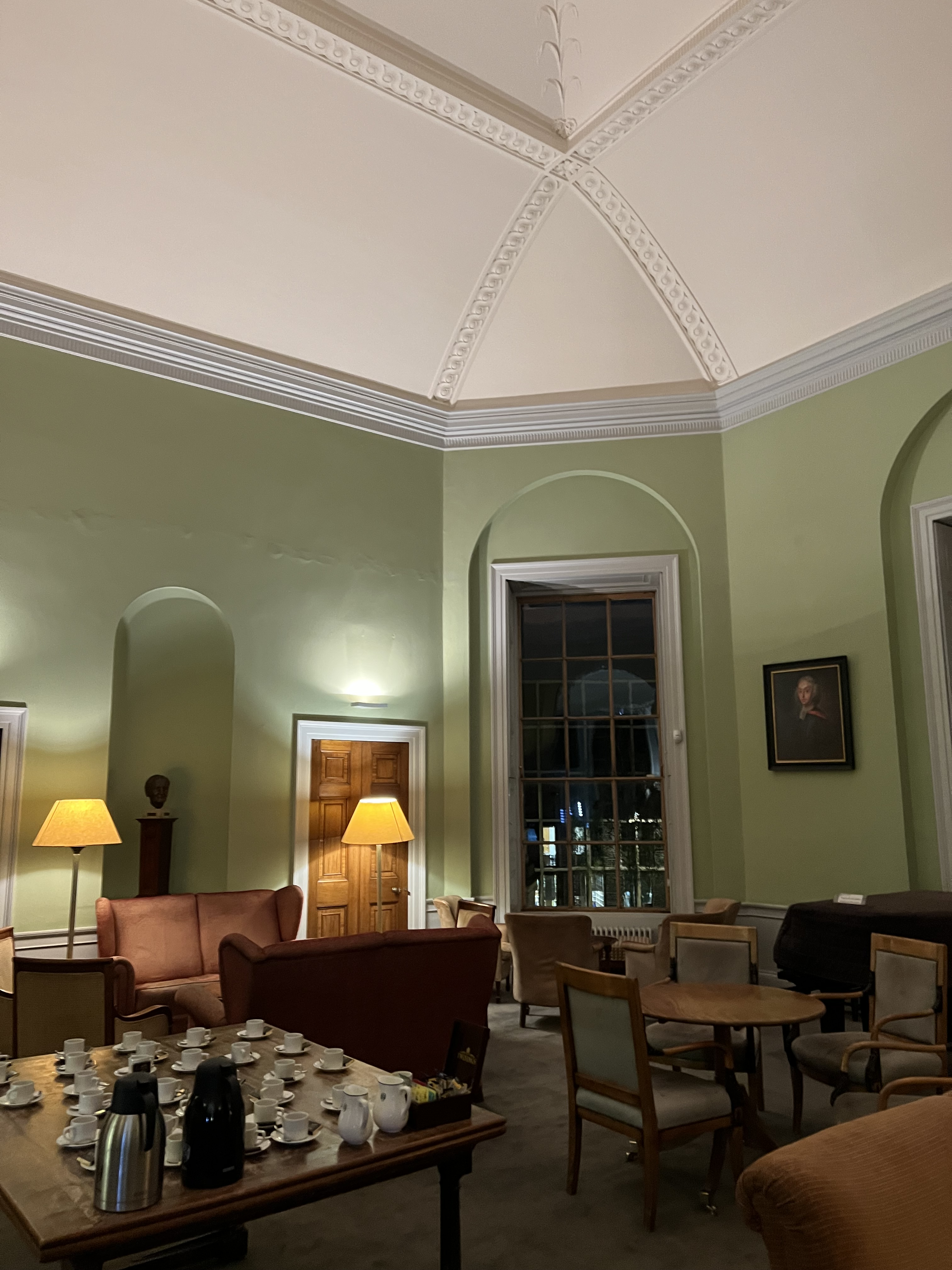
Graduate Common Room – Green Templeton College

Alternative names are sometimes used for college MCRs. Brasenose College has the "Hulme Common Room" (HCR), and University College has the "Weir Common Room", named in honour of college alumni. At Christ Church, St Antony's and Green Templeton colleges, the representative bodies for postgraduate students are called "graduate common rooms" or "GCRs". At some graduate colleges such as Wolfson, St Cross and Linacre College, students and fellows share a single common room.

The JCR and MCR presidents of all affiliated Oxford common rooms, in addition to their OUSU reps, are automatically voting members of OUSU's governing council, which meets fortnightly during term to decide on virtually all aspects of OUSU's policy. the OUSU council meetings take place in odd-numbered weeks of the university term. JCR presidents also get together in even-numbered weeks for meetings of the presidents' committee (popularly known as prescom). MCR presidents also get together up to three times a term for meetings of the MCR presidents' committee (popularly known as MCR-prescom).

Colleges sometimes have additional common rooms, such as the "Summer Common Room" at Magdalen College, or the "Alumni Common Room" at St John's College. These are sometimes, but not always, associated with a particular section of the student or academic body.

A pilot scheme started in 2025 sees the JCR and MCR presidents meet with the officers of Oxford University Student Union twice a term in the Conference of Common Rooms.

==== Cambridge ====
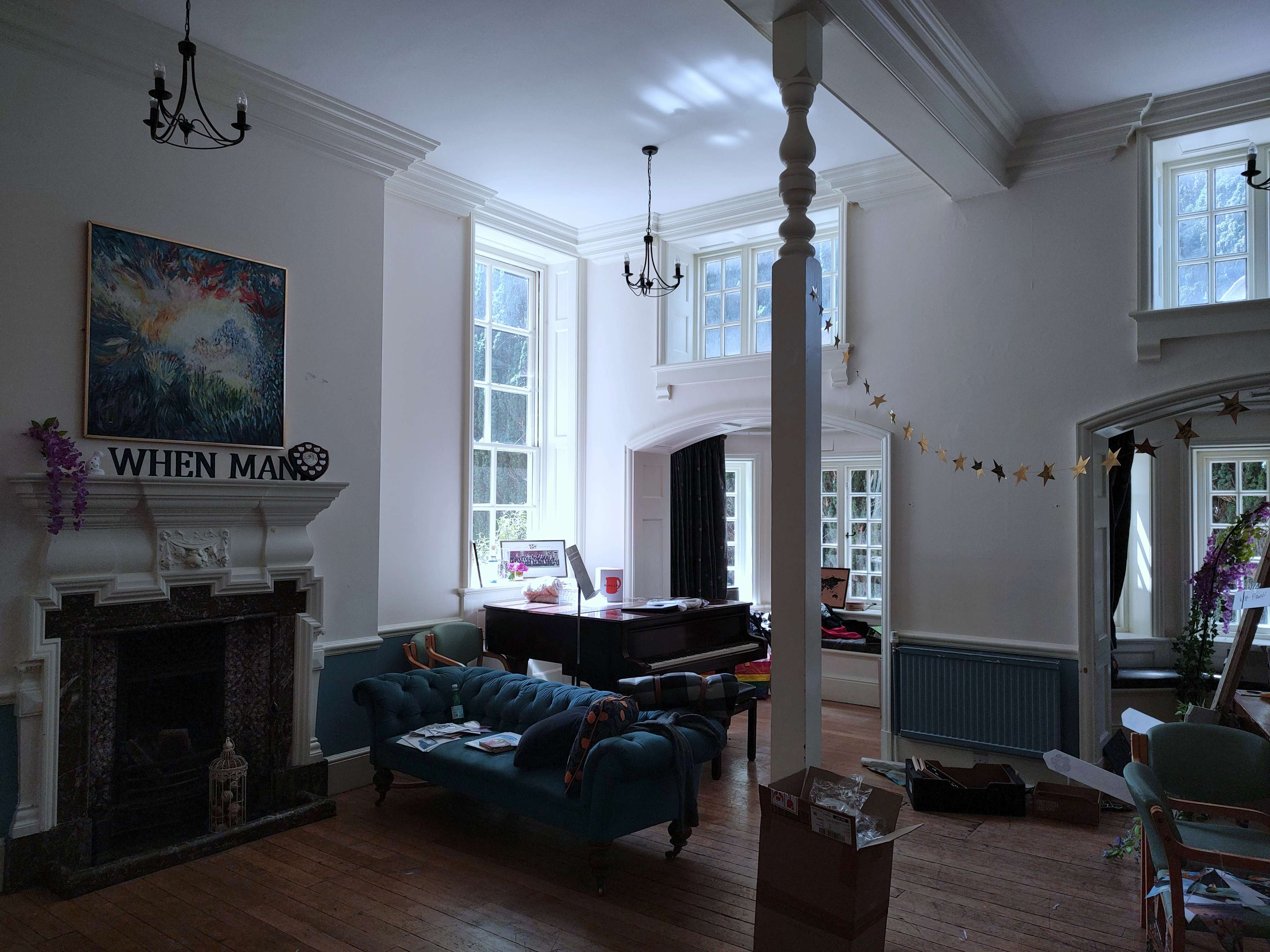
The Middle Combination Room of Newnham College, Cambridge

At the University of Cambridge, common rooms as rooms have existed for a long time. However, it was only in the mid 20th century that the idea of the JCR committee as a representative body of the students arose. Prior to this, the room had generally been administered by the 'amalgamated clubs' – the college's sport societies – sometimes through a JCR committee formed by these societies, sometimes simply through a JCR secretary. At Magdalene, the JCR committee was appointed by the tutors rather than by students until the late 1950s, while at Caius the previous year's committee ('the Gargoyles') appointed their successors until 1963. The last college to move from a single officer to an elected committee was Fitzwilliam in 1969.

The same abbreviations, JCR, MCR, and SCR are used for combination rooms and common rooms. The JCR represents undergraduates, with postgraduate students being members of the middle combination room. In some colleges, postgraduates are members of both the MCR and JCR: for example, at St John's, where the MCR is known as the Samuel Butler Room. Most colleges also have an SCR. At Pembroke the common rooms are called "parlours", such as the Junior Parlour and Graduate Parlour. At Jesus College, Cambridge, the JCR is known as "The Jesus College Students' Union", with its physical space being the Marshall Room. A similar arrangement is found at Trinity College, where the JCR is known as the 'Trinity College Students' Union' and occupies the physical JCR, and the MCR is known as the BA Society, occupying the BA Rooms.

Sidney Sussex College, Cambridge, has both a JCR, MCR, and SCR along with a Sidney Sussex College Students' Union of which all students are members.

At Homerton College the JCR is known as the Homerton Union of Students. The president is the only sabbatical JCR or equivalent officer at a Cambridge college.

JCRs and MCRs have elected committees to represent their interests within their colleges and in the central students' union. The committees are almost universally led by a president and a range of other elected positions to cover specific areas or interest or functions (e.g. secretary, treasurer, entertainment). There is a great deal of variety between the colleges in terms of the roles that the JCRs and MCRs undertake, how much influence they have in college affairs and how many functions they provide. Nearly all are responsible for organising Freshers Week and frequent entertainments.

Cambridge Students' Union's student council has two members per college, corresponding to one for each JCR and MCR except where a college has only a single student common room.

==== Durham ====
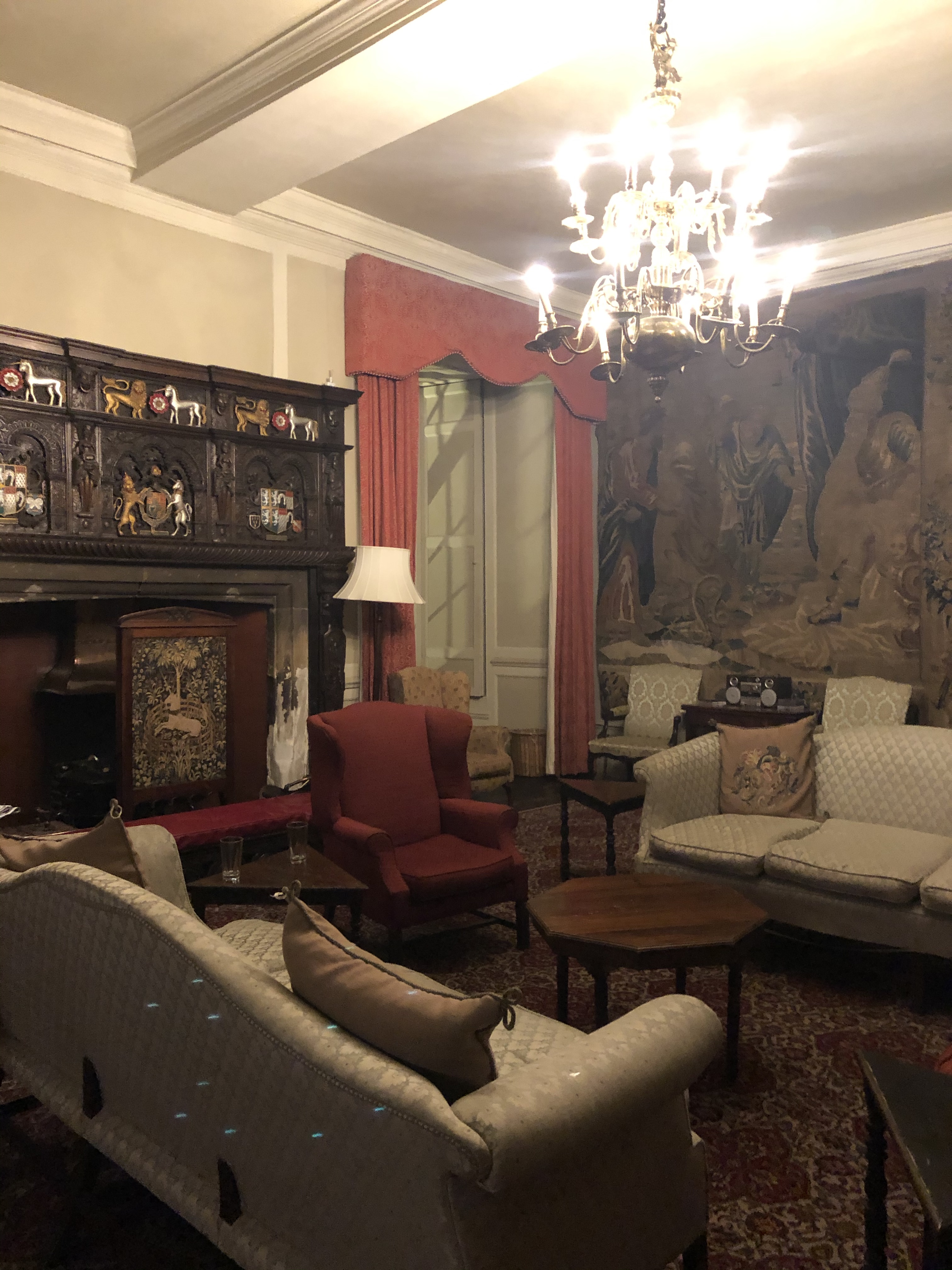
Senior Common Room, University College, Durham

At Durham University, the existence of a "Student Common Room or equivalent body or bodies" in every college is mandated by the university statutes. The standard division and nomenclature followed at most colleges is:

- A JCR for undergraduate students
- An MCR for postgraduate students
- An SCR for academics who are members of the college

Some colleges have slight differences from the standard arrangement:

- The College of St Hild and St Bede has a Students' Representative Council (SRC), which includes both undergraduates and postgraduates at the college.
- St Aidan's College combines the MCR and SCR into one SCR whereby the postgraduates and senior members belong to one common room as a whole.
- St Cuthbert's Society combines the JCR and MCR into one JCR.
- St. John's College has "St. John's Common Room" (SJCR), representing undergraduates, an MCR, representing postgraduates, for university students in St John's Hall, along with the Cranmer Common Room (CCR) representing theological college students in Cranmer Hall.
- Ustinov College, which does not take undergraduates, has a graduate common room (GCR) for its students.

Membership of the college JCR or MCR is not obligatory, and costs an additional fee, but the vast majority of students choose to join. Following the removal of exempt charity status from students' unions by the Charities Act 2006, some of the student common rooms at the maintained colleges remained independent charities, recognised as student unions under the Education Act 1994, while most voted to become 'student organisations' within the university's Durham Student Organisations (DSO) framework. Common rooms can vote to leave the DSO framework and become registered charities, or vice-versa. As of 2022, seven of the fifteen maintained colleges have independent JCRs (or equivalent) and eight are DSOs. Among the independent colleges, St John's Common Room is an independent charity (taking in the MCR and Cranmer Common Room). For student common rooms that are independent, the college council in each maintained college is responsible for ensuring (on behalf of the university's council) that the common room follows the requirements placed on students' unions by the 1994 act. Similar to many university-level students' unions, all but two of the seventeen colleges at Durham have at least one paid sabbatical officer for their JCR (or equivalent), and some have more. A framework for senior common rooms is under development as of July 2022.

Durham Students' Union's Assembly includes a representative from each college as well as the chairs of the JCR and MCR presidents' committees.

==== York ====
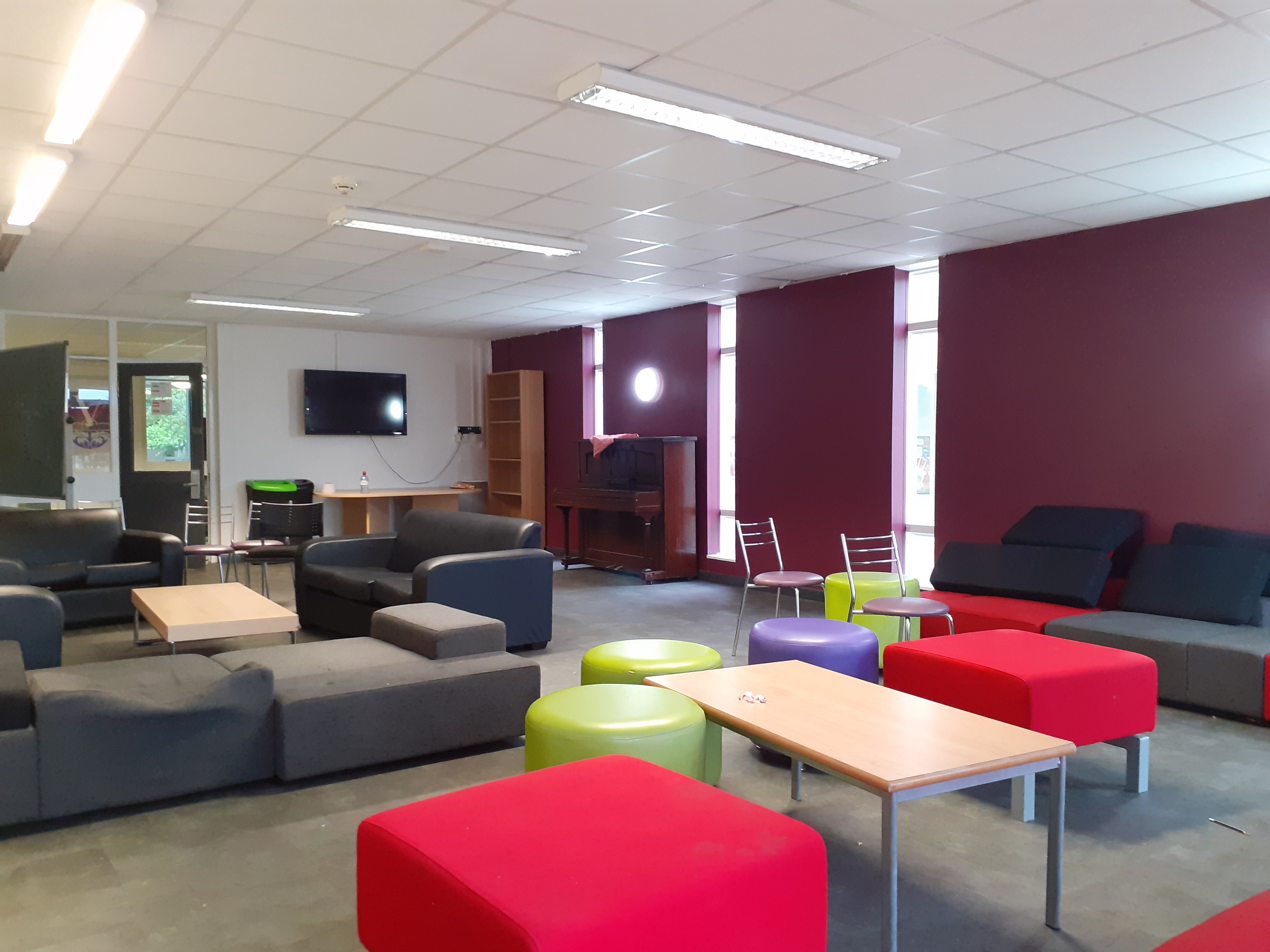
Junior Common Room at Vanbrugh College, York

Colleges have an elected 'college committee' representing students, called either a JCR committee or a college student association (CSA) committee. As of 2023, most colleges have a student association, but Derwent and James still have JCRs and Wentworth, a graduate-only college, has a Graduate Student Association.

The York University Students' Union has a chairs and presidents committee, which includes the chairs or presidents of each colleges' common room committee or students association. It has "primary responsibility for setting Union direction on issues of importance relating to the University’s Colleges and collegiate system".

==== Lancaster ====
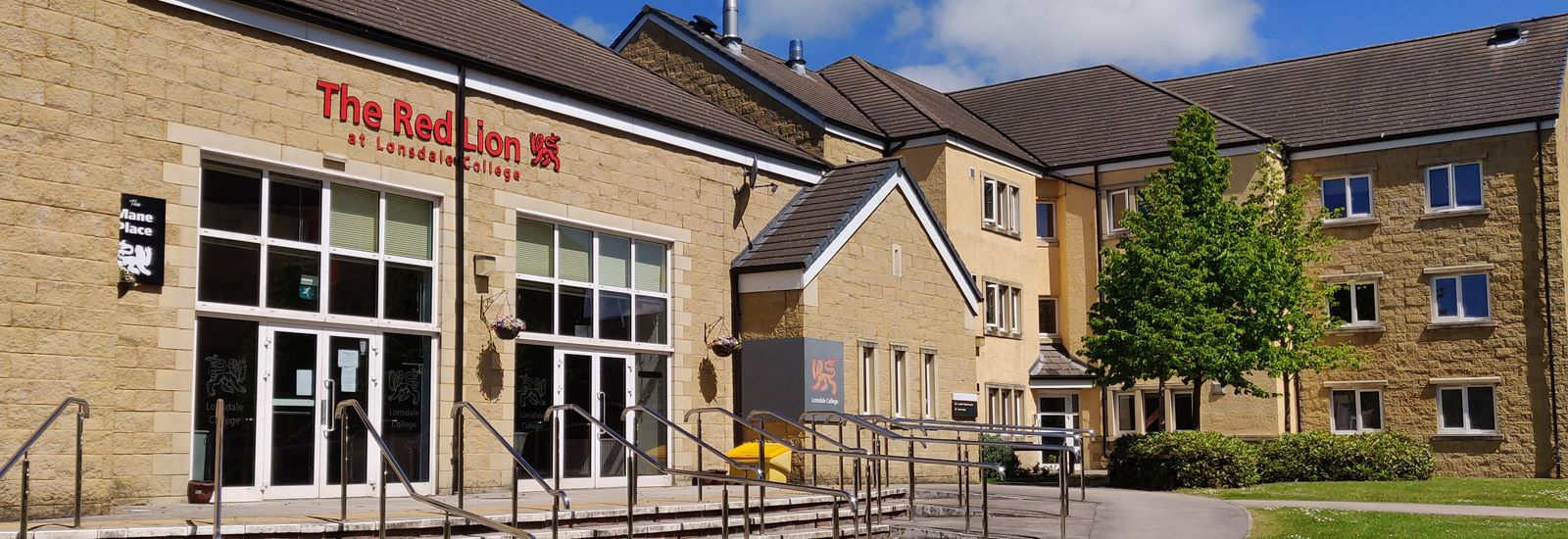
The JCR and college bar at Lonsdale College, Lancaster

At Lancaster, undergraduates are members of one of eight colleges (with a ninth college for postgraduate students). Each undergraduate college has a JCR while Graduate College has a postgraduate board, all of these groups being part of Lancaster University Students' Union. The presidents of the JCRs and the graduate board are voting members of the students' union's assembly, which meets twice a term.

==== Roehampton ====
At Roehampton, each college has an elected president and deputy president as part of Roehampton Students' Union. The college presidents, together with the central students' union president and vice-presidents, form the presidents' committee, the main executive body of the union.

=== Non-collegiate universities ===
While a number of non-collegiate universities had hall JCRs in the past, these had mostly vanished by 2025 in favour of professional residential life teams.

==== Bristol ====
Halls at the University of Bristol had student-run junior common rooms in 2024 that organised social events and represented students in the residence. The JCR referred to the committee rather than the student body as a whole. As of 2025, the university had taken over the organisation of social events.

==== Leeds ====
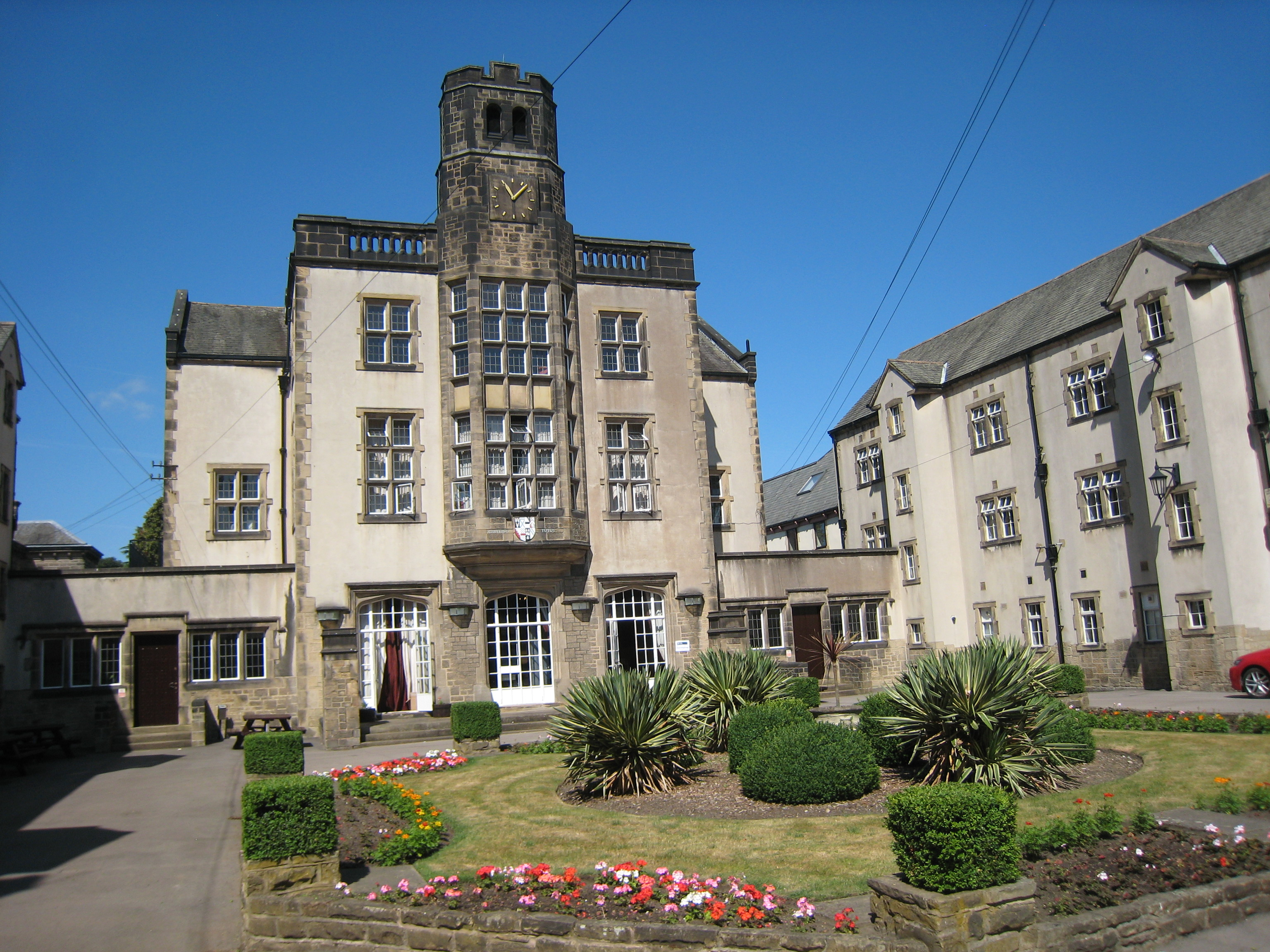
Devonshire Hall, where the social committee is known as the JCR Exec

At Leeds, the social committee is referred to as the JCR Exec at Devonshire Hall, the last of the university's traditional halls. Other halls also have social committees, although not referred to as JCRs. Students may apply to the university for positions on these committees from A-level results day onwards. Devonshire Hall is also unique in having a music president and a drama president in addition to the normal positions at the other halls.

==== Nottingham ====
At the University of Nottingham there were junior common room committees in many of the halls of residence that organised social events for residents of those halls in 2023. As of 2025, social events are organised by the university's Residential Experience Team.

==== Reading ====
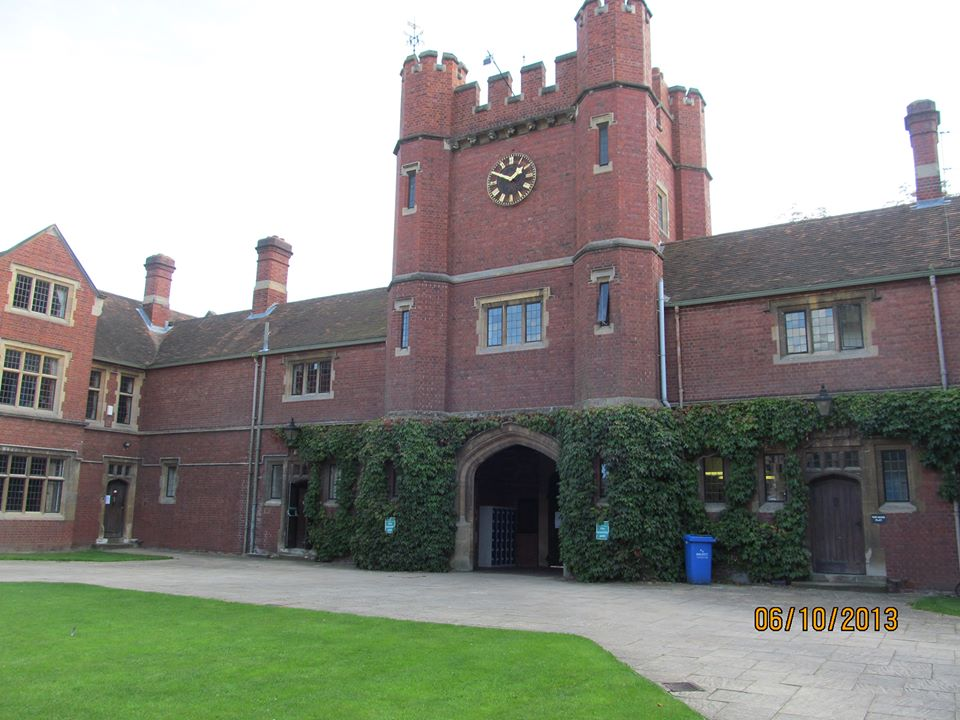
Wantage Hall, which has Reading's last JCR

In 2023, University of Reading JCRs were part of the Reading University Students' Union. There was an elected JCR committee at each hall of residence, which represents the students living in that hall and organise social events. As of 2025, only the JCR in Wantage Hall is listed by the students' union.

The Staff Common Room (SCR) is the staff social club at the university. It began life in 1897 as the College Common Room, taking in both staff and students. It has at various times been termed the Staff Common Room and the Senior Common Room. Its membership includes academic, administrative and technical staff.

== Other countries ==
=== Australia ===
==== University of New England ====
The University of New England has a residential college system, with the colleges having JCRs that organise social events.

=== Ghana ===
==== University of Ghana ====
The University of Ghana has JCRs representing students from its undergraduate halls as well as in the business school.

=== Ireland ===
==== Trinity College ====
Trinity Hall, Dublin has the only JCR at Trinity College. The JCR is the representative body for students living at the hall, and primarily provides services to resident students, while Trinity College Dublin Students' Union is the main representative body for student members of the college. The college also has a number of 'student spaces' termed JCRs around the campus. Trinity Hall also has an SCR, consisting of the warden, deputy warden and assistant wardens.

=== Singapore ===
==== National University of Singapore ====
The National University of Singapore has elected junior common room committees in its halls of residence, as well as senior common room committees. The JCR and SCR work together to plan events and the JCR also represents the students in the hall to the university administration, the university-wide students' union, and to JCRs in other halls.

=== United States ===
==== Harvard ====
At Harvard College, each house has a senior common room, composed of academics, alumni and others from the local area. However, the student representative bodies in the houses are known as "HoCo" (short for "house committee"), with the term "junior common room" referring to an actual room.
