= Wentworth College, York =

College of the University of York, England

Coordinates: 53.94613°N 1.05867°W

Wentworth College
- University of York
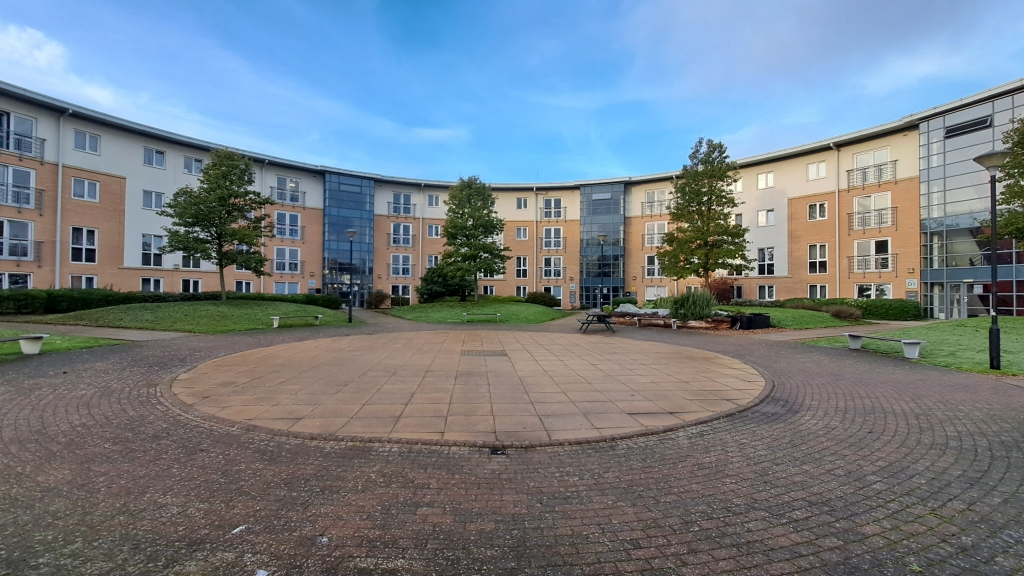
- Location: Heslington West, York
- Motto: Latin: Per diversa inventio
- Motto in English: In diversity, discovery
- Established: 1972 - Foundation; 2001 - Refounded
- Named for: Thomas Wentworth, 1st Earl of Strafford
- College Manager: Dr Claire Anderson
- Principal: Russell Yates
- Deputy College Manager: Barry Crump
- Undergraduates: 55 (2022/2023)
- Postgraduates: 5,515 (2022/2023)
- Website: Wentworth College

Wentworth College is a college of the University of York, named after Thomas Wentworth, 1st Earl of Strafford. Wentworth was refounded in 2001 and is a postgraduate-only college.

== History ==
The college was founded in 1972. Wentworth was refounded in 2001 and became the postgraduate-only college of the university. Postgraduates can however choose membership of any of the colleges at the university. Wentworth College currently has around 500 resident graduate students and a further 4500 non-resident college members.

When York Nightline was created in 1972, it was based in Wentworth College until it moved to Vanbrugh College in 1979.

In summer 2024 it was announced that the Wentworth College Nucleus building would be closed and mothballed. The university cited high operational costs and the lack of the buildings suitability to modern demands.

== Buildings and services ==
Wentworth houses the Department of Sociology, and the Vedge cafe (formerly the Edge), which is currently closed. The Graduate Common Room functions as a games room while the Senior Common Room is used for small formal and informal gatherings, including the Wentworth Seminar Series and the College Manager's afternoon tea. Other communal areas include a breakout room and a study space, as well as a lending library.

In addition, Wentworth has a computer room, a prayer room and a laundry room as well as an art and ceramics studio.

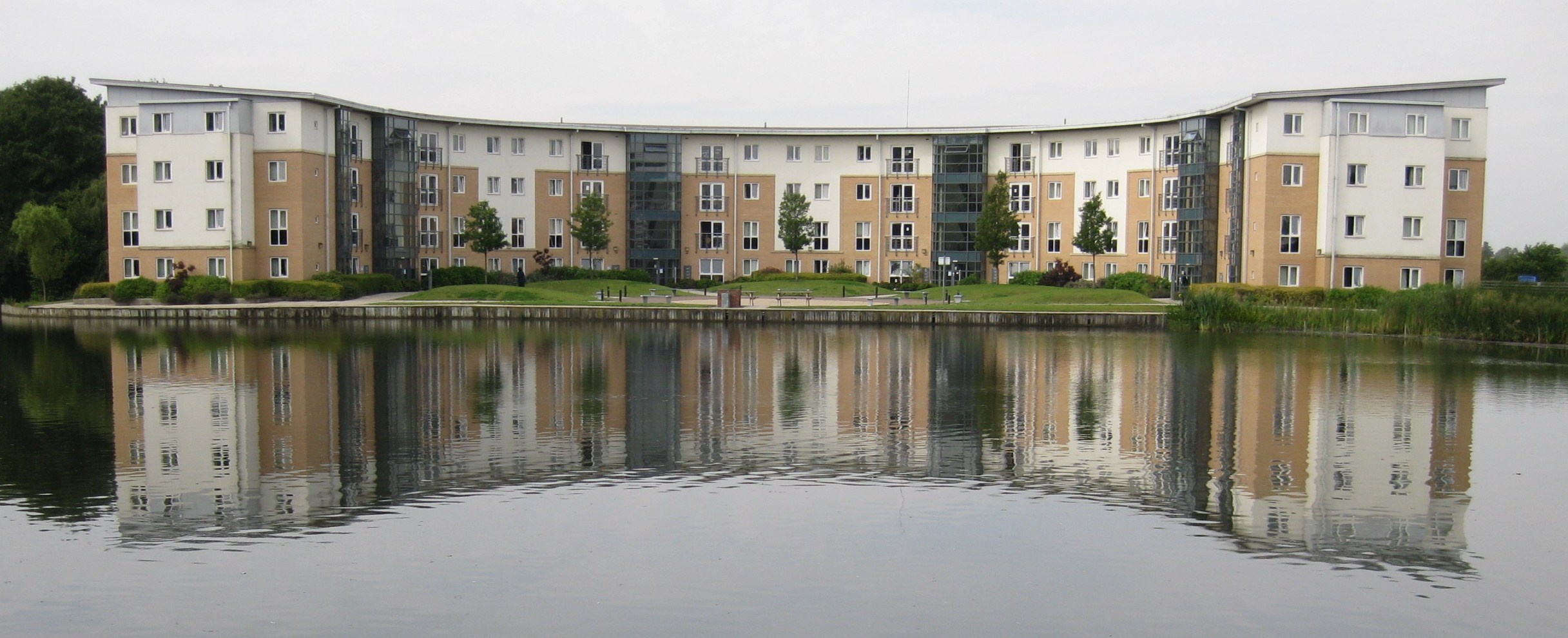
Wentworth College accommodation viewed from across the lake

== Student life ==
As a postgraduate only College Wentworth does not have a Junior Common Room, it does however have a Graduate Common Room and a Graduate Common Room Committee. The college is a vibrant, academic and social community.

== Principal ==
The current principal of Wentworth College (provost until 2015) is Russell Yates.

=== List of provosts and principals ===
- Eric W Hawkins 1972-1975
- Norman Rea 1975-1977
- J Martin Bell 1978-1985
- Peter M Lee 1985-2005
- Carl A Thompson 2005-2010
- Russell Yates 2010-present
