= SCAN (newspaper) =

Student newspaper at Lancaster University, England

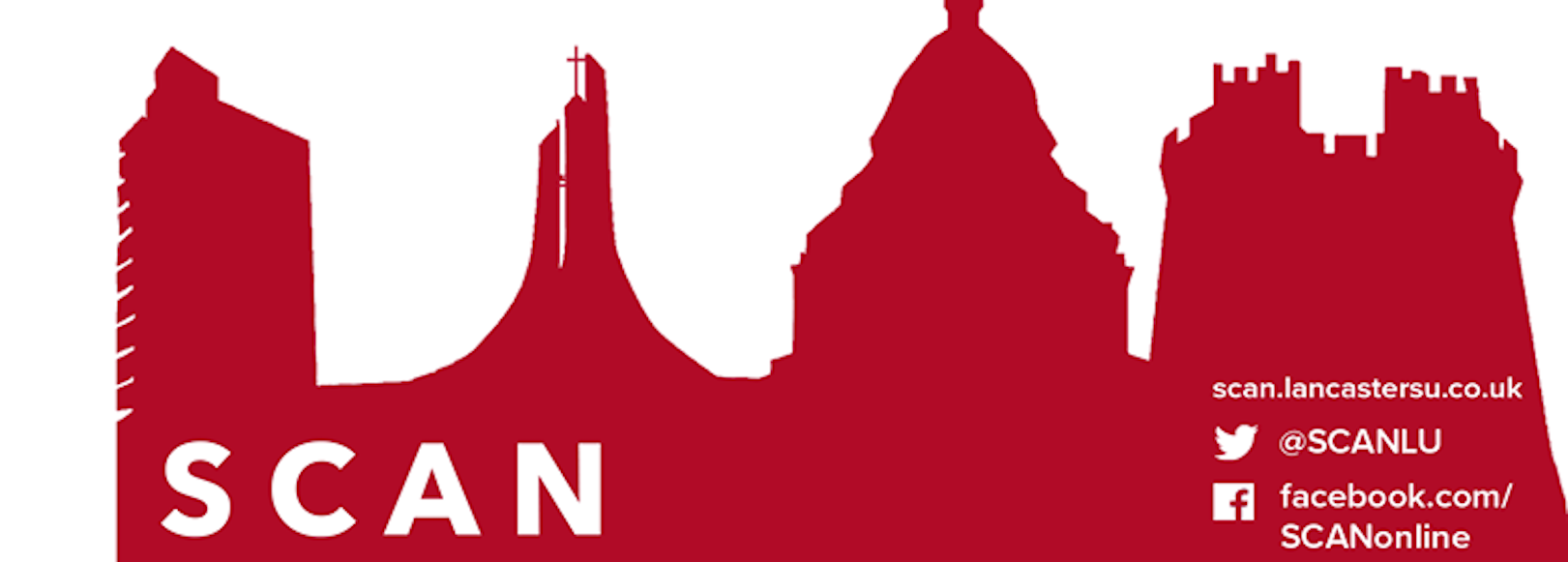

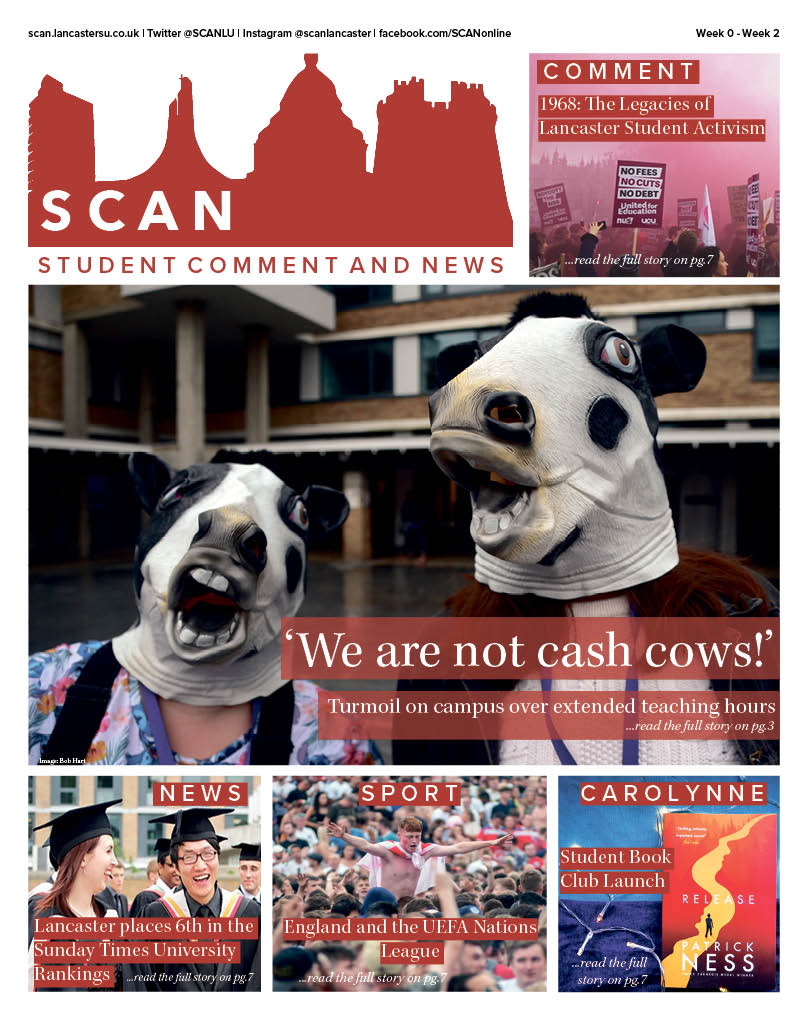
- SCAN 2018 Freshers Edition
- Type: Fortnightly newspaper
- Format: Compact
- School: Lancaster University
- Owner: Lancaster University Students' Union
- Publisher: Mortons
- Editor: Ami Clement
- Founded: June 1967
- Language: British English
- Headquarters: Lancaster University, Bailrigg, Lancaster, LA1 4YT
- Country: United Kingdom
- Readership: 7,340 (fortnightly) (Note: This is the number of print and online readers combined. The online part is the number of unique visitors tracked on the website. The print figure is calculated from the number of papers not returned each fortnight, multiplied by the average number of readers per paper as estimated by the Circulation Verification Council 2014 readership study.)
- Website: scan.lusu.co.uk

SCAN: Student Comment and News is a student newspaper at Lancaster University. It publishes during term time in print, and throughout the year online. SCAN was founded in 1967, making it one of the longest-running student publications in Europe, and is now managed by the Lancaster University Students' Union (LUSU).

== History ==
First abbreviated from Student, College, and Administrative News, SCAN began in June 1967 as a one-page newsletter printed 500 times on carbon copy paper by the staff at Lancaster, one month before the university's first graduation ceremony. The founding edition was a folio-sized transcript of the latest decisions made by the Student Representative Council (SRC), produced at a grand cost of £6.5s.3d.^{:101} In 1973, shortly after gaining enough money to open its first sabbatical position, the SRC began designating editors for the growing publication. Two years later, the SRC was rebranded as the Lancaster University Students' Union, and editor became an elected sabbatical role. SCAN's growth began to outpace that of LUSU's finances. Though the paper charged up to £400 to design and display a single advert, the union was forced to request a 20% increase in its share of university revenue in 1979 to continue printing.

Under elected leadership, SCAN began to distance itself from LUSU for the sake of political and operational independence. Its slogan changed from "The Lancaster University Students' Union Newspaper" to "The Voice of Lancaster University Students". It moved to its own campus headquarters in Slaidburn House in 1997, to which it returned in 2014. In 2008, editor Dan Hogan relaunched the paper as Student Comment and News, maintaining the original acronym.

A year later SCAN switched publisher from Central Lancashire Printers to Trinity Mirror, going colour on 100% recycled paper. In 2010 the paper joined the Lancaster University 'joint student media initiative' sharing its membership, facilities, and coverage more closely with LA1:TV and Bailrigg FM, and editor Lizzie Houghton introduced arts & lifestyle section Carolynne as "SCAN's stylish, more lighthearted sister". The section is named after an older publication at Lancaster, founded in 1964 and rated second only to the magazines in Oxford, which publication was in turn named by Bowlander William Smethurst after his girlfriend, Carolynne Harmsworth. In its first printing run under Tabitha Lambie, the Carolynne section was scrapped, described by existing editors as "dead weight."

In 2013, Rachel May Quin became SCAN's first non-sabbatical editor. The position is open to, and elected by, members of the joint student media initiative only, further improving the newspaper's independence but resulting in a 97.3% drop in editorial election turnout from 2010 to 2015.

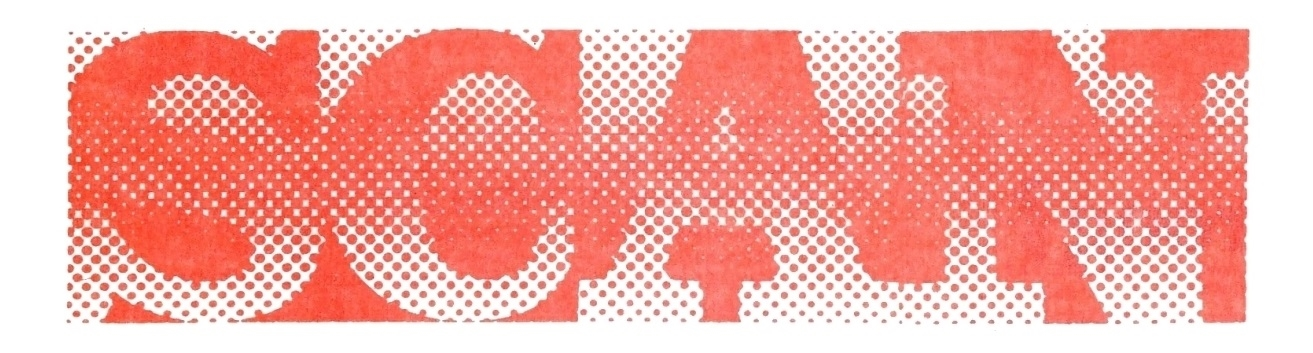
The logo of SCAN in 1976

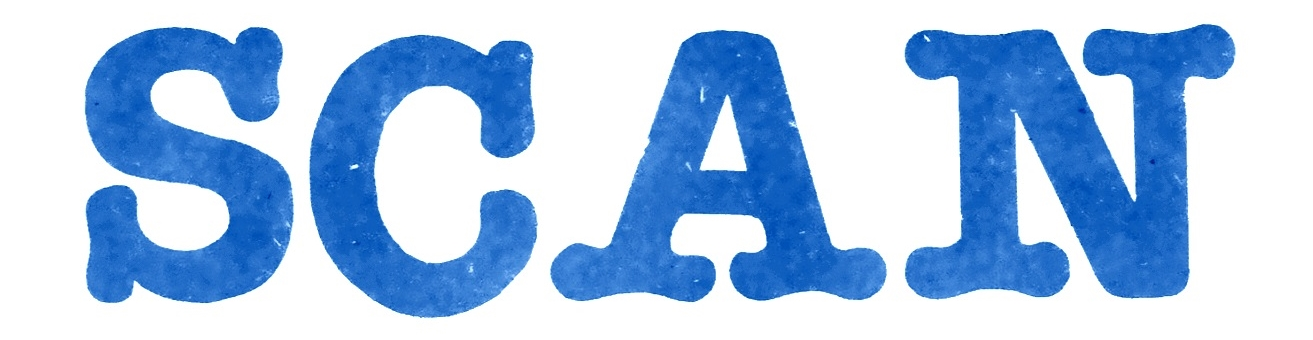
The logo of SCAN in 1985

The logo of SCAN in 1994

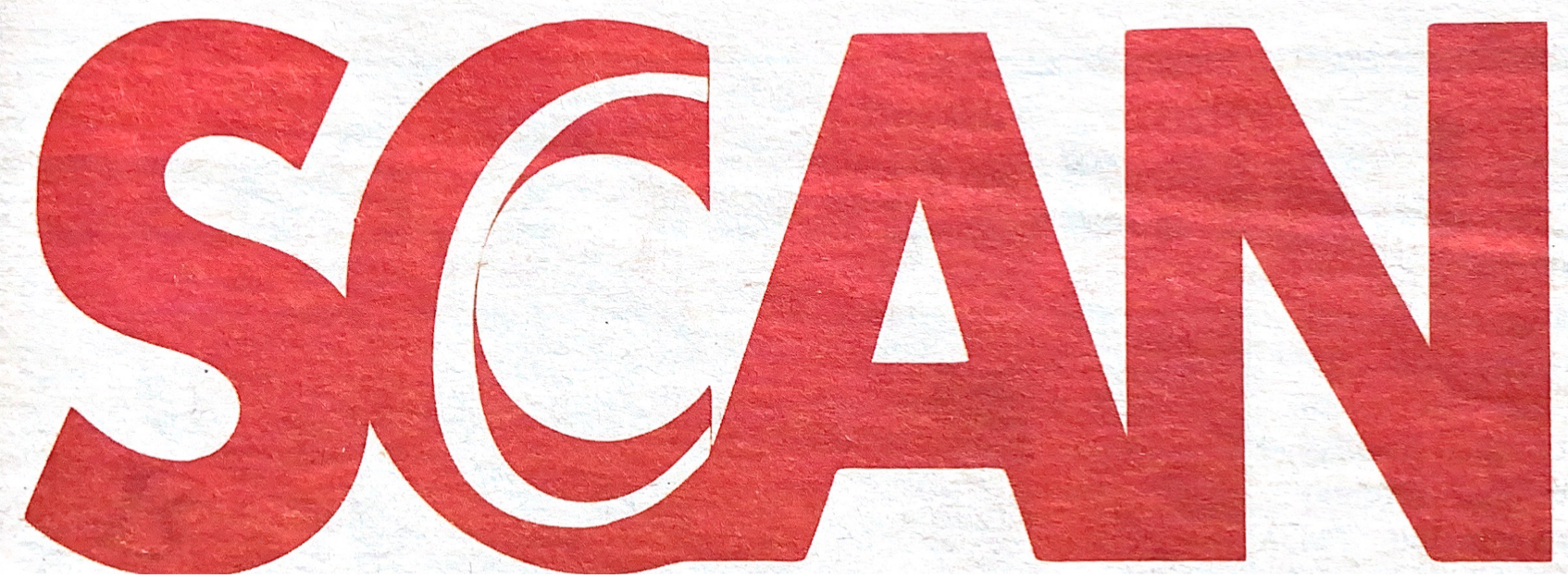
The logo of SCAN in 2004

For much of its history SCAN was not Lancaster University's only student newspaper. It overlapped with historical titles like Carolynne and John O'Gauntlet, which provided more comical, scandalous, and pointed coverage of student life at Lancaster but disappeared in 1971 and 1972 respectively.^{:87-107} In 1993 a short-lived parody of the paper, Self-Centred Arrogant Nonsense, was circulated around campus, and in 2012 a more elaborate imitation, SCAM: Student Comment and Moos, was "stealth-distributed" on the printers in the university library and online at scam.lusers.co.uk. More serious rivals in 2012 included The Whistleblower, which claimed to be "Lancaster University's Only Independent Student Newspaper", and Fritz, a high-tech magazine run by members of the Management School. Both ran on a platform of true political independence from LUSU, but neither could sustain the funds for more than four editions.

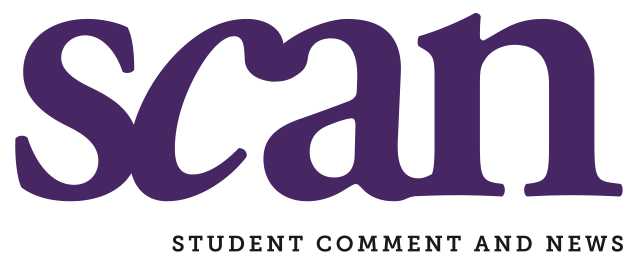
The logo of SCAN from 2008 until 2018

Since 1967 SCAN has worked with the police to gather information on crime and delivered breaking news on Parliamentary scandals and national strikes. Every year the SCAN sports team reports live and in detail on the largest intervarsity sports tournament in Europe, and the number of students reading SCAN's criticisms of voter turnout in university-wide sabbatical elections is often greater than the turnout itself. SCAN has also interviewed MPs, cabinet ministers, NUS presidents, and such diverse names as Owen Jones, Ian Hislop, James May, Simon Bird, Rolf Harris, and the Kaiser Chiefs. A complete archive of SCAN is kept in refrigeration beneath the university library.

== Organisation ==
SCAN is run by students at Lancaster University and is managed by student-led company LUSU. Unlike most student societies at Lancaster, SCAN is a constitutional part of the union. LUSU's vice president for Campaigns & Communications has ultimate control over SCAN's content, but the editor is able to influence union policy from a permanent seat in LUSU Council. The editor is the budget holder and spokesperson of SCAN, and is elected each year from the membership at SCAN's summer AGM. The remainder of SCAN's executive, including the heads of photography, web, and mobile, the production team, and the eight sections editors, are selected from the membership at the discretion of the editor. Section editors may select a deputy and can remove the editor with a vote of no confidence.

2,000 copies of the newspaper are distributed in 'bins' around campus every other Monday morning. SCAN does not charge for its papers or advertise for external companies, and has no formal political sympathies. Its editorial stance varies from year to year and its opinion pieces demonstrate wide internal pluralism, sometimes to the point of being combined into contrived and supererogatory 'head-to-head' articles. However, SCAN's legal and financial dependence on the students' union has often brought its true political independence into question. On 23 November 2015, the union censored a cartoon in SCAN about a failed LUSU referendum on whether to divest from Israeli companies. To avoid such situations SCAN editors often try to build working relationships with union representatives, though it is not unusual for a leading candidate for vice president to be incapable of naming the editor in the first place.

== SCAN Online ==
The newspaper's website, SCAN Online, was launched in 2001. It hosts articles from print editions and web-only content. Almost 100% of SCAN's budget is spent on print, and the site is considered a cheaper, simpler, and faster way of breaking news. Editor Rachel Harvey predicted in 2012 that SCAN would have to revert to monthly printing or move entirely onto the website. Since then publication frequency has not changed, but the number of pages per edition has declined. The site is regularly redesigned and has gained photo, video, and live blogging capabilities. SPINE was introduced as a new online section in October 2013 by editor Rachel May Quin, in an effort to improve online content and reflect the industry's shift toward digital media consumption, hosting GIF- and meme-based listicles with plans to produce viral content. This has since been dropped but was revived by an independent group of students in 2019–20. The SCAN Online site crashed several times in 2014–5, meaning further sections and features could not be introduced until SCAN Online was completely renovated.

In October 2015 the magazine began hosting on WordPress. In 2021 the Fashion & Beauty section was taken out of print and posted entirely online after a record low submissions of articles.

== Notable contributors ==
- Louis Barfe - author, journalist, and research consultant
- John Freeman - comic writer and designer
- Warren Nettleford - BBC producer and Channel 5 reporter
- Dave Shackleton - music journalist, Vice President of Sony

== Awards ==
Year	Award	Nomination	Result
2002	Guardian Student Media Reporter of the Year	Jon Colman	Won
2004	Guardian Student Media Website of the Year	lusu.co.uk/scan	Runner up
2004	Guardian Student Media Critic of the Year	Alex Boekestyn	Runner up
2004	Guardian Student Media Sports Writer of the Year	Laura Bylund	Shortlisted
2005	Guardian Student Media Critic of the Year	Howard Mustoe	Shortlisted
2019	SPA Best Feature	Adam Saraswati Rawlings	Highly Commended
2019	SPA Best News Story	Oliva Kenny	Shortlisted
2022	SPA Best Publication	SCAN	Shortlisted
2022	SPA Outstanding Contribution	Tabitha Lambie	Shortlisted
2023	SPA Best News Story	Tabitha Lambie	Shortlisted
2023	SPA Best Sports Section	SCAN	Highly Commended
2023	SPA Best Newspaper Design	SCAN	Shortlisted

== See also ==
- Student newspaper
