= Nasta =

Nasta or NASTA may refer to:

- National Student Television Association, United Kingdom
- Nasta, manufacturer of the Hit Stix toy musical instrument in the United States in the 1980s
