= Lancaster University Students' Union =

Organisation in UK

- Institution: Lancaster University
- Location: Bowland College West Wing, Bailrigg, City of Lancaster
- Established: 1 January 1967
- President: Kate Bracewell
- Chief Executive: Misbah Ashraf
- Members: c. 16,800
- Website: lancastersu.co.uk

The Lancaster University Students' Union (LUSU) is a students' union at Lancaster University in Lancashire, England. It is a registered company and charity overseen by a board of trustees. Politically, it is led by four sabbatical officers - the President, Wellbeing Officer, Education Officer, and Activities Officer - who are elected annually by the student membership.

== History ==
=== Early history, 1964–74 ===
The original student government at Lancaster University was the university Junior Common Room (JCR), which was a meeting of the entire student body, and college JCRs, though the colleges did not yet exist in physical form. The day-to-day running of the University JCR was deputed to a committee called the Student Council, which was responsible to the University JCR. The Council set up various sub-committees to deal with areas such as lodgings, charities week, and the university bookshop.

In June 1965, two students presented a report on the future of Student Council, in which they argued: "To coordinate the activities of the University societies some central organisation and representation is required. To this end we will have to have a Students' Union which will be similar to other University unions but with no union building." In response, Professor Tom Lawrenson, the principal of Lonsdale College, argued that there should instead be "a top body which arises organically from the colleges... I feel that the body you propose would be, in time, schismatic and in vacuo, devoid of real roots among its constitutents in a collegiate university..."

=== 2019–20 controversies ===
==== Bailrigg FM broadcast license ====
In April 2019, LUSU announced that it would not be renewing funding for Bailrigg FM's full-time FM broadcast license and that it would have to switch to online-only broadcast after 20 years of broadcasting on 87.7FM. The story was picked up by local by regional radio and news outlets BBC Radio Lancashire and newspaper Lancs Live, with then Station Manager of Bailrigg FM, Pascal Maguet, giving interviews to both expressing disappointment at the decision. Alumni members of the radio station such as Louis Barfe, James Masterton and Paul Dale publicly condemned the decision as well as a number of student media institutions at other universities.

The decision was overturned by the Trustee Board in August 2019.

==== Proposed sale of The Sugarhouse ====
In September 2019, following a leak to the media, LUSU confirmed that negotiations were underway to potentially sell the Sugarhouse nightclub to build student flats, following a vote of the Trustee Board The "risk of noise complaints" was identified as a key reason to sell the Sugarhouse, but it was revealed that no noise complaints had been made about the nightclub. Many expressed opposition to the decision, including alumni James May and Cat Smith, along with Lancaster city councillors. Concerns were raised over the role Lancaster University management played in pushing for the sale, and the lack of transparency surrounding the process. Following the backlash against the proposed sale, LUSU's Chief Executive and two external trustees resigned.

After petitions opposing the plans on Change.org and on LUSU's website received over 4,000 and 1,100 signatures respectively, the LUSU Exec decided to hold a student referendum in November 2019 over the sale, in which 94% of students voted against the sale. Despite having refused to guarantee that the referendum result would be respected, LUSU's Trustee Board unanimously agreed to abandon their plans to sell the Sugarhouse in December 2019.

==== Sabbatical officer resignations ====
In November 2019 and March 2020, two sabbatical officers resigned, both citing a "toxic" culture within the students' union. In May 2020, after having been re-elected to serve a second term, the president was summarily dismissed following an independent investigation and hearing into unspecified, but multiple, complaints against him. Immediately following his dismissal, a third sabbatical officer, and two voluntary student officers also resigned. The following month, an independent appeals panel upheld the decision to dismiss the former president.

==== June 2020 Presidential by-election ====
A new president for the 2020–21 academic year was elected in a June 2020 by-election, but the Returning Officer's decision to disqualify all votes cast for the Re-Open Nominations (RON) option led to many students questioning the legitimacy of the result. Other concerns about the process of the by-election were raised, including discrepancies in the reported turnout figure and the fact that the JCRs did not oversee the vote count, as is required by LUSU's bylaws. Most JCRs issued statements demanding LUSU's rationale for disqualifying RON be publicised, and for the results before the disqualification to be released, as it was widely assumed that RON would have won. Additionally, Grizedale JCR threatened to boycott freshers' week, and County JCR to disaffiliate from LUSU entirely if their requests for transparency were not met. The Women+ voluntary student officer-elect also resigned in protest over LUSU's handling of the by-election.

=== Proposed reforms ===
Following several unpopular decisions made without student consultation (such as the attempts to sell The Sugarhouse nightclub and to remove the funding for Bailrigg FM's radio broadcast licence), student demands for the reform of the Trustee Board grew throughout 2019. The fact that since 2016, the Trustee Board was majority-unelected was identified as a reason for them repeatedly coming into conflict with the democratic will of the student membership. The October 2019 LUSU AGM voted for all the trustees to be elected by the student membership, and for a constitutional convention to review LUSU's Articles of Association and related bylaws. In addition, students voted for the Trustee Board to be majority-elected in a November 2019 referendum.

== Services ==
=== The Sugarhouse ===
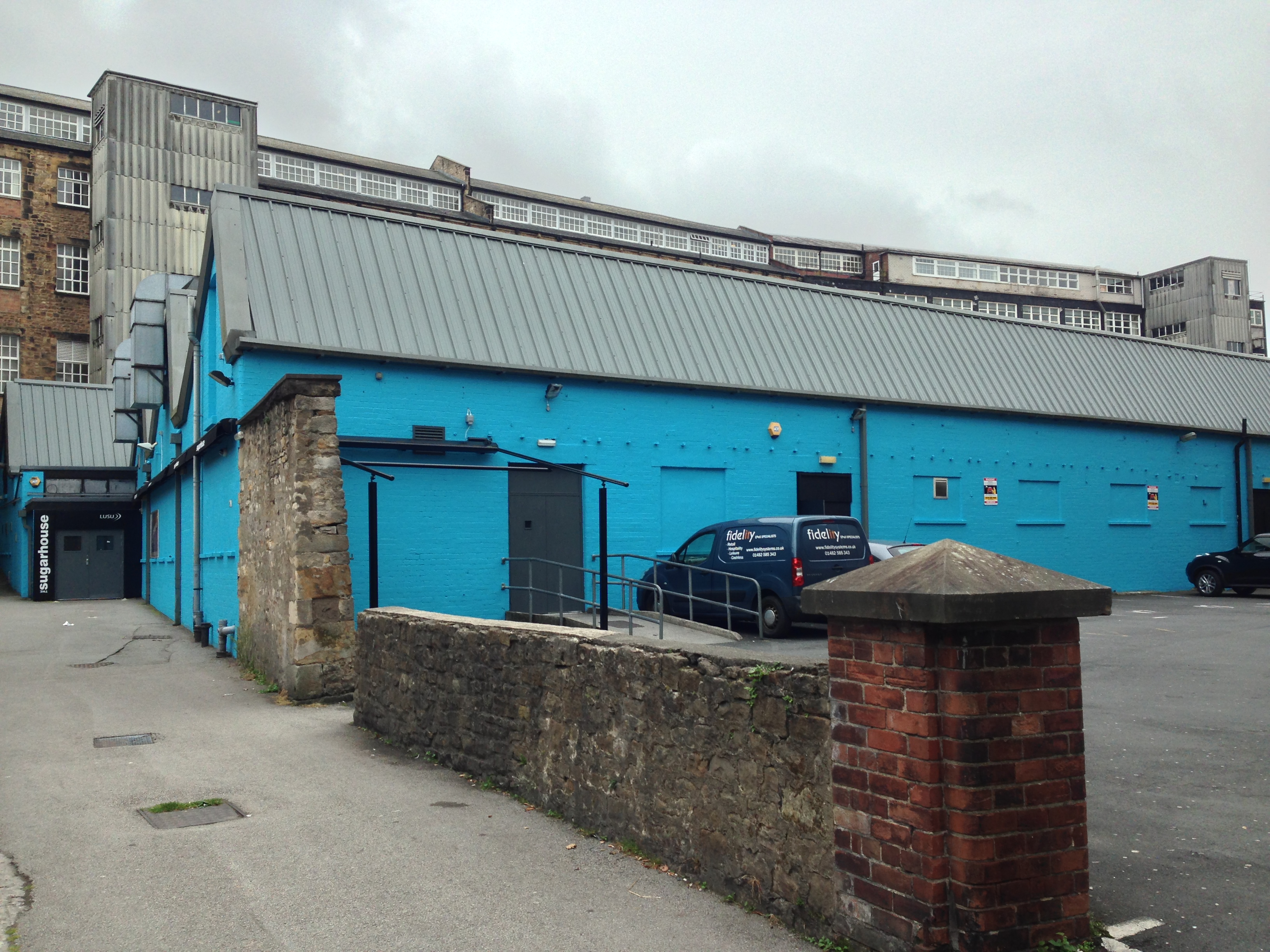
Sugarhouse Nightclub

The Sugarhouse is a nightclub which has been operated by LUSU since 1982.

=== LUSU Living ===
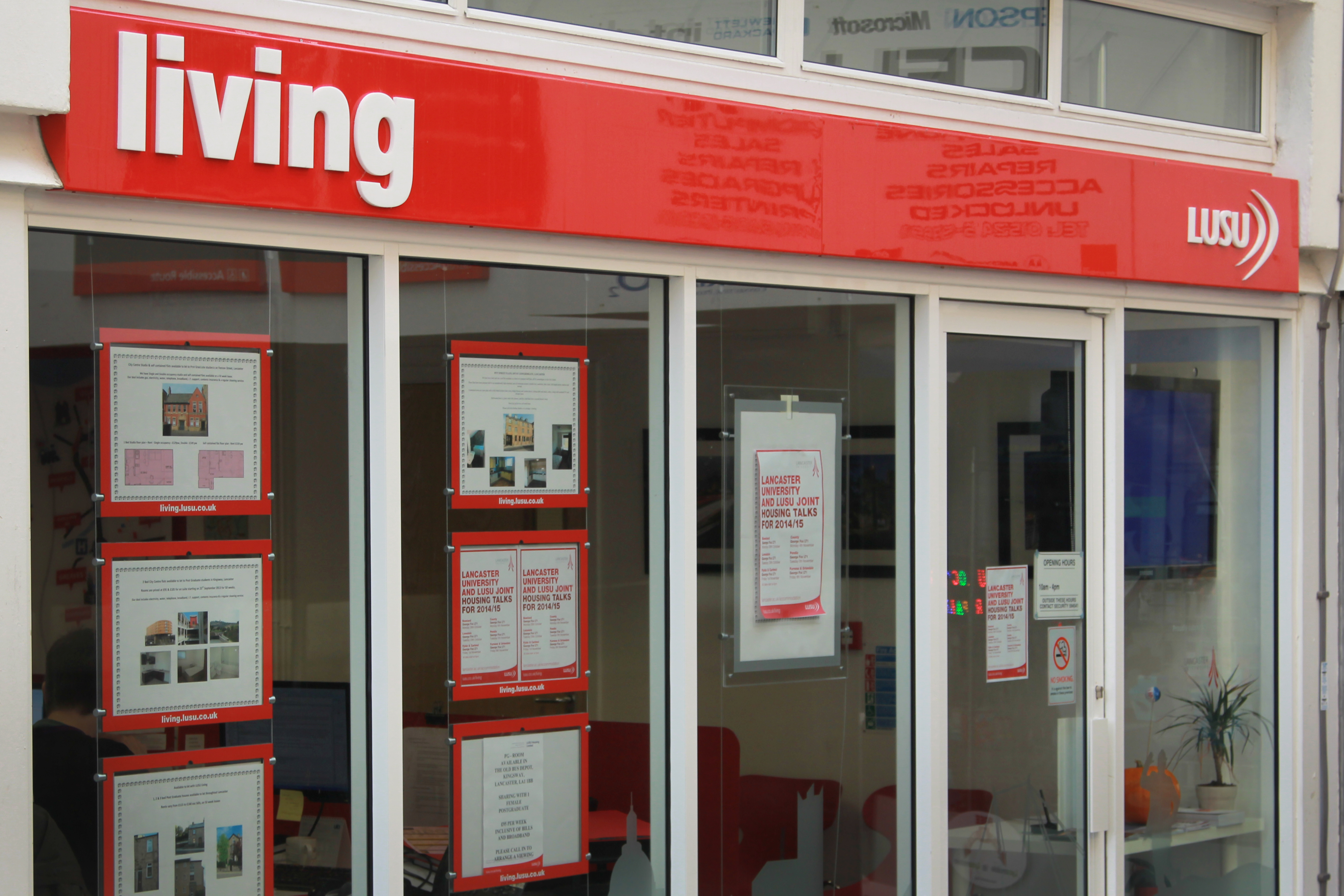
Living

LUSU Living is a commercial letting agency owned and operated by LUSU, and is available to students of Lancaster University and The University of Cumbria. It had a turnover of £3.6 million in 2019, and its annual profits are donated to LUSU to fund its other services. At LUSU's Annual General Meeting in October 2019, students supported a motion which described LUSU Living as a "notoriously poor" Lancaster student letting agency. In April 2020, LUSU reported a data breach to the Information Commissioner's Office after landlords' personal details were erroneously emailed to a student.

=== 'Extravs' ===
Extravs (short for extravaganza) were a longstanding tradition of parties at Lancaster University, hosted by each undergraduate college, and facilitated by LUSU, held after exams to mark the end of each academic year. For these parties, each college chose their own individual theme, decorated their bar spaces to fit this theme, and the 1000+ attendees to each Extrav usually dressed up in a theme-appropriate outfit.

Due to consistent losses after the pandemic, in 2024 the decision was made to cease Extravs, and replace these events with one 'Summer Ball', a large multi-college festival style event spanning a large portion of north campus, with Professor Green headlining.

The 2024 Summer Ball was a success, however once again funding posed a problem, and the event did not come back for 2025.

== Student media ==
=== SCAN ===
SCAN (an acronym for Student Comment and News) is Lancaster University’s student newspaper and is usually published fortnightly during term time by LUSU. It was founded in 1967 as a one-page newsletter by members of staff at the University. It has continued to evolve over the years, becoming one of the longest running student newspapers in Europe. A special digital issue was published in April 2020 during the COVID-19 pandemic.

=== Bailrigg FM ===
Bailrigg FM is the student radio station of Lancaster University, operated by an elected subcommittee of the Students' Union. Bailrigg FM provides news and entertainment across the University's campus (known as Bailrigg) to staff and students on 95.3 FM. It is one of only a handful of student radio stations in the UK to broadcast non-stop on FM. Being one of the first to set up in the UK, they have a long history dating back to the 1960s. Any student at the University may join and every member can run to be elected to the management committee.

=== LA1TV ===
LA1TV is LUSU’s television station and is run by students who produce a variety of programmes, such as ‘SugarTV’ and ‘The Sportscaster’. The name ‘LA1’ is taken from the postcode of the university.

=== Take 2 Cinema ===
Take 2 Cinema is the student union's on-campus cinema, based in Bowland College Lecture Theatre.

== Clubs and societies ==
LUSU provides support and funding for over 160 official activity groups and 80 sports clubs, ranging from ‘Assassins Guild’ to ‘Wilderness Medicine’ and everything in between.

== Roses Tournament ==
The Roses Tournament is an annual sports competition between Lancaster University and the University of York in England, which was founded in 1965. The competition is organised by LUSU and YUSU, and is held every summer term during the first few weeks, alternating its venue between the two universities.

== Awards ==
=== Green Impact Awards Gold Standard ===
LUSU has a strong environmental and ethical track record which has been recognised by the Union being awarded the Gold Standard by the NUS in the Green Impact Awards. This makes LUSU one of only 5 Universities in the UK achieve this standard. The Union has also won a Green Gown Award in 2011 and been highly commended in the Children and Young People Now Awards.

=== NUS Students’ Union of the Year ===
LUSU was shortlisted for the Higher Education Students’ Union of the Year award at the National Union of Students (NUS) Awards 2013.
