= National Student Film Association =

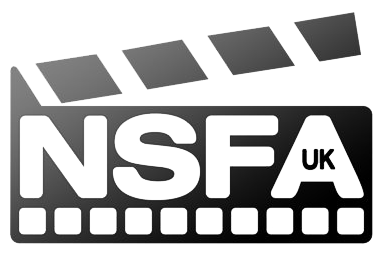
- Abbreviation: NSFA
- Founded: 16 June 2009
- Founded at: London, England
- Type: Charitable organization
- Purpose: Student, Filmmaking
- Region served: United Kingdom
- Chief Executive: Rowan M. Ashe
- Website: www.nsfa.co.uk

The National Student Film Association is a charity based in the United Kingdom that supports and promotes student filmmaking through various networking and educational programmes. The organisation was founded in 2009 by a group of film students from five different Universities, looking to connect students studying film courses from various institutions across the country. In 2015 it became a charity, promoting cooperation and collaboration between student film societies, festivals and filmmakers at a national level.

== History ==
On 16 June 2009, students from five Universities (Bristol, Cambridge, Cambridge School of Art, London South Bank and UCA) formed the National Student Film Association with the sole purpose of connecting student filmmakers.

Later that year the organisation formed a partnership with Screentest, the largest student film festival in the UK, holding its first annual general meeting during the event on 28 February 2010. The festival has held a number of competitions in association with BAFTA and the BFI as well as sponsoring student festivals including the No Limits Film Festival.

Following a short interval period, filmmakers Rowan M. Ashe, Rebecca Graffy and original founding member Franzi Florack, revived the NSFA with the mission to establish it as a national charity and it was awarded charitable status by the Charity Commission on 12 November 2015.

== Screentest ==
Screentest is the officially endorsed film festival of the NSFA, allowing it to use the title The National Student Film Festival. Established in 2004 at the University of Bristol, the festival is periodically hosted by numerous universities across the country. It is currently hosted by the London South Bank University.

== See also ==
- BAFTA
- National Union of Students (United Kingdom)
- Student television in the United Kingdom
