= TVCatchup =

Former free UK internet TV service

- Screenshot TVCatchup website as of 2013
- Company type: Private company
- Website type: Internet television
- Area served: United Kingdom
- Website: tvcatchup.com
- Current status: Offline

TVCatchup was an Internet television service for viewing free-to-air UK channels. It operated as a cable service and retransmitted BBC, Channel 4, Channel 5, and ITV, amongst others, only in the UK. Users were able to access the service via desktop browsers as well as smartphone and tablet apps. The service was funded by advertising, with advertisements preceding the live channel stream.

The service was originally launched in 2007 as a personal video recorder in the cloud, before being redesigned as a live-streaming service. As of October 2013, it had nearly 10 million active users, according to the company, with 2 million viewers tuning in to the service to watch the England versus Poland FIFA World Cup qualifier on 15 October 2013.

On 4 June 2014 TVCatchup Ltd went into administration by order of London's High Court of Justice. The service remained online, despite winding up and liquidation orders made in May 2015. In August 2017, Bruce Pilley, a former director of the company, was banned from being a company director for nine years for failing to disclose that the company had a winding-up order against it when drawing down a loan.

== Features ==
TVCatchup retransmitted free-to-air channels appearing on Freeview and Freesat within the UK. Users were able to view up to 17 channels live via the Internet.

As of 17 September 2013, the website also offered a catchup service, providing listings for recently aired programmes from the UK's four largest broadcasters, and redirects viewers to their on-demand services.

It was possible to record TV in 2007, but that functionality was removed in 2008. The company said in 2010 that the facility would be returning to the site.

== Channels ==
The following channels were available to all United Kingdom television licence holders:

Category	Channels
Entertainment	BBC One, BBC Two, BBC Alba, BBC Four, ITV, Channel 4, Channel 5, S4C, Quest
Music	VIVA
News	BBC News, BBC Parliament, Al Jazeera English, RT, CCTV News
Kids	CBBC, CBeebies
Sport	Sail TV
General	BBC Red Button Community Channel, Gala TV, Millenium TV, Subtv
Shopping	Craft Extra, Create And Craft, Ideal Extra, Ideal World, TV Warehouse, QVC, QVC Beauty, QVC Extra, QVC Style

== Infrastructure ==
TVCatchup owned its entire infrastructure. In 2010 it was reported that the network had a capacity for 50 GBps.

== Platforms ==
The service was accessed through desktop browsers with Adobe Flash installed. It can also be viewed on the Windows Media Center functions of Windows Vista (Home Premium and Ultimate) and Windows XP Media Center Edition 2005.

TVCatchup was accessible on mobile devices through a range of free apps. An iOS app was released on the iTunes Store in 2011 for both iPhone and iPad. The app was compatible with Apple Airplay, meaning it can be viewed on a TV set. The app can be set to receive only via WiFi, to avoid incurring potentially high streaming costs. An Android app was released in September 2012, available from the Google Play store. In December 2012, an app was launched for the Kindle HD Fire tablet. In February 2013, an app was launched for Windows Phone 8. All mobile devices can access the service through their browsers.

There is a plug-in available for XBMC. It used to be watchable on a PS3, however as of a firmware update in 2010 this is no longer possible.

There was also an Adobe AIR desktop application released in Beta mode on 28 April 2009 for the Ubuntu 8.10 operating system, which was to be gradually updated to include features such as a full TV guide and PVR.

TVCatchup released an Adobe AIR cross-platform desktop PVR into Beta mode on 8 May 2014, with features including a full TV guide, pop out player and PVR .

== Dispute with G Zero ==
In December 2015, TVCatchup announced on their site that they had commenced legal action against G Zero Ltd, an app developer it had originally contracted to provide mobile apps for its service. It is claimed that GZero used TVCatchup's IP to create and launch their own app, ToView Live TV which offers a similar service using both an advertising and subscription model. ToView is, according to the complaint, a re-brand of the original TVCatchup app. As of February 2016, this legal action is still pending and the GZero app is still available in app stores. TVCatchup relaunched their app in December 2015.

== Legality ==
TVCatchup retransmits free-to-air channels over the Internet on the basis of section 73 of the Copyright, Designs and Patents Act 1988 (CDPA 1988), which allows for the retransmission of 'qualifying services'. Its status as a cable service was challenged by ITV, Channel 4 and Channel 5, when they issued legal proceedings in June 2010. In the hearings held in June 2011, Lord Justice Floyd in the High Court of Justice ruled that TVCatchup's defence relying on s.73 of the CDPA 1988 was valid. The judgement expressly excludes retransmission of any other channels under these provisions as well as retransmission to 3G mobile devices, home WiFi Mobile reception remains unaffected. In a court order dated 7 October 2013, the High Court ruled that TVCatchup should cease retransmitting the 'digital channels' of ITV, Channel 4 and Channel 5 but not the principal channels. TVCatchup was also required to deposit an amount of £200,000 in lieu of costs and ordered to cease retransmission by mobile broadband, although it has been granted leave to appeal this decision. Meanwhile, reception by WiFi remains permissible.

On 26 March, the Court of Appeal dismissed TVCatchup's appeal, meaning the PSB channels may only be streamed by WifI. On the same day, the Department for Culture, Media & Sport published an open consultation on the balance of payments between television platforms and public service broadcasters within which the department stated the government's intention to repeal section 73.

Although the Welsh public service broadcaster S4C is covered under the provisions of the CDPA 1988, the channel entered into a formal carriage agreement with TVCatchup in August 2013.

The site was initially conceived as an online PVR service, where users could select shows from one of 30 free-to-air channels to record up to one week in advance of their broadcast. However, following concerns from broadcasters about the functionality of the site, TVCatchup voluntarily suspended its services while their concerns were addressed.

== Discontinuation ==
iOS app

According to the Apple App Store listing for the iOS TVCatchup.com app, the company who published the app was Toyon Investments Limited.

Companies House, in the UK, report that company as being "dissolved" on 26 February 2019, which will likely be the reason behind the discontinuation of the TVCatchup.com streaming service.

Android app

The Android app is published by a company called Spaceshifting, LLC., and as-of March 2021 is still available to download in the Google Play Store, despite the listing stating the last update published for the app was made on 16 October 2017, and most recent user comments reporting the app as being non-functional.

According to OpenCorporates.com, this was a company registered in Nevada, USA, and it declared "dissolution" on 8 February 2018.

Social media

As of March 2021, a Twitter account still exists for TVCatchup.com, but has not posted since 14 March 2019.

== See also ==
- Internet Television
- IPTV
