= Stoic (disambiguation) =

A stoic is a person whose moral quality is associated with stoicism.

Stoic may also refer to:

- STOIC, a programming language
- Stoic (film), a 2009 film by Uwe Boll
- Stoic (mixtape), a 2012 mixtape by rapper T-Pain
- The Stoic, a 1947 novel by Theodore Dreiser
- HMS Stoic, an S class submarine of the Royal Navy in World War II
- Stoic (company), an American video game developer
- Student Television of Imperial College, the former name of student television station operated by Imperial College London, abbreviated STOIC

== See also ==
- Stoick the Vast, a fictional Viking character (chieftain and Haddock's father) in How to Train Your Dragon books and films
