= Bailrigg FM =

Coordinates: 54.009064°N 2.784949°W

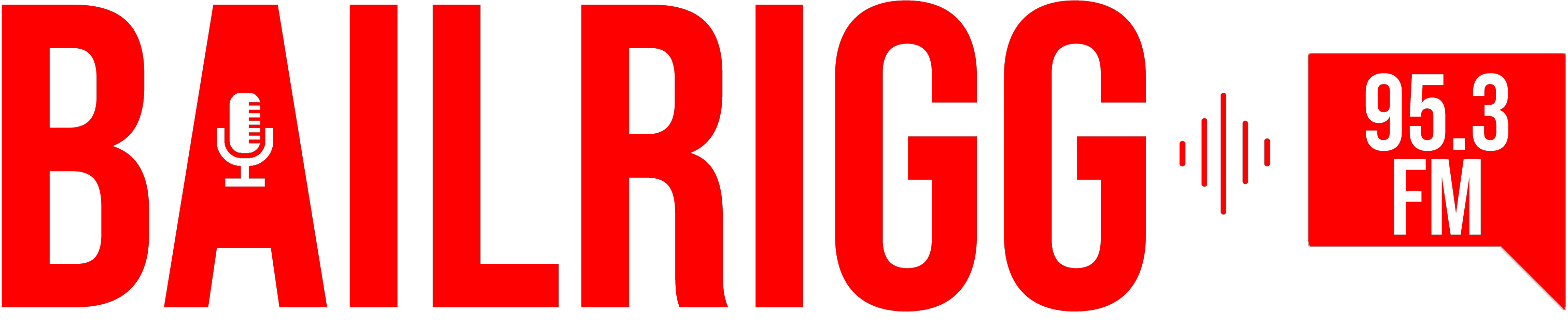
- Lancaster; United Kingdom
- Broadcast area: Lancaster University, Bailrigg
- Frequency: FM 95.3 MHz

Programming
- Language: English
- Format: Student Radio
- Affiliations: Student Radio Association; Lancaster University

Ownership
- Owner: Lancaster University Students' Union
- Sister stations: LA1TV (Television)

History
- First air date: January 19, 1996
- Former names: University Radio Bailrigg (pre 1996)
- Former frequencies: FM 87.7 MHz (1994–2022); AM 963 kHz (1973–1996)

Technical information
- Licensing authority: Ofcom
- ERP: 2W

Links
- Webcast: Listen Live
- Website: bailriggfm.co.uk

Bailrigg FM (formerly known as University Radio Bailrigg (URB) and Radio Bailrigg) is a student radio station at Lancaster University. It operates in a music format predominantly featuring pop, but also broadcasts news, drama, comedy, and entertainment. During evening and weekend hours, programming moves to specialist content where presenters are free (within reason) to play whatever they wish.

Bailrigg is one of the oldest student radio stations in the country, (Note: Although a contentious and hard to verify claim, this student society has long claimed it was the first of the UK student stations permitted a licence to actually start broadcasting. The claim of "first permanent FM student station" is a matter of interpretation. Radio Station Management reported back to society members during the negotiations that the Radio Authority believed the station to be the first to have a permanent FM licence. Oxford University later made the same claim. However, Bailrigg FM was from 1996 onwards limited to the campus of Lancaster University and broadcast initially only during term-time, whereas the colleges of Oxford University are spread across the city of Oxford, which made it the first permanent FM radio station run by students and available to the general public (and a rival to local independent radio for advertising revenue). Potentially the only way to verify any of the claims would be to access the archive of the Radio Authority (which is now a part of Ofcom).) as well as being the first student station to broadcast on FM. It airs 24 hours a day, seven days a week, all year round. Bailrigg first broadcast on FM as part of a one-month, 25W restricted service licence in March 1994 under the directorship of Paul Dale. It had previously applied for a licence in September 1993 but was turned down by the Radio Authority due to the launch of The Bay in March of that year.

It originally broadcast to the university on 312m Medium Wave using an inductive loop aerial system around the various halls of residence. Now listeners can tune in on campus on 95.3 MHz, or listen anywhere in the world using the station's live webstream. Bailrigg FM holds several large events throughout the year, including a seven-day Freshers' Week outside broadcast and coverage of the Lancaster University Students' Union (LUSU) sabbatical elections. During the Roses Tournament the station joins with University Radio York (URY) to provide programming across both campuses.

The station has received several national Student Radio Awards over the years, including Best Website, Best Station Sound and more recently Best Technical Achievement.

== History ==
=== Pirate Radio at Lancaster University ===
Following students at the University of York getting permission to test-transmit programs on medium wave in 1968, a couple of Lancaster University physics students started negotiations with the university to start a similar project. However, progress of the project was pushed back after an over-eager student started his own pirate radio station called Radio 220.

=== University Radio Bailrigg (1969–1996) ===
In the summer of 1969, following permission from the university, a small loop aerial and a low power transmitter was built to test the feasibility of a student radio project at Lancaster. After multiple bids for funding, University Radio Bailrigg (URB) received £1,000 funding from the student union and was able to install studio equipment in January 1971. Test transmission began in the March of that year.

The Government of the United Kingdom forced URB off air due to the station broadcasting without a full license in November 1972. However, after being issued a license, it returned to air in 1973 with new transmission equipment. URB would broadcast on 963 kHz on AM. By 1974, URB had received £2,000 in funding from the university which meant that twin studios were able to be built in Fylde College.

In 1994, URB became the first student radio station to be issued an FM Restricted Service License, to broadcast on 87.7 MHz for four weeks. The broadcasts covered the City of Lancaster (including Morecambe), (Note: Details would appear in the minutes of the weekly society meetings, which should be in the archives of Lancaster University Student Union.) (Note: Details of each FM launch were reported in the Lancaster University Student Newspaper "Scan", and should be available in their archives within Lancaster University Student Union.) with reception reported as far afield as Preston, Blackpool and Barrow-in-Furness. A second four-week FM licence is received in 1995, again broadcasting on 87.7 MHz.

=== Bailrigg FM (1996–present) ===
Due to high repair costs of the medium wave loop induction system, URB opted to start broadcasting permanently on FM on 19 January 1996, and rebranded to 'Bailrigg FM'. (Note: The preparations and launch of the permanent FM station in 1996 were captured in a video documentary entitled "Listening To Images" which was created by undergraduate students as a module towards a degree. This is available to watch via Bailrigg FM's Youtube channel)

In 2004 Bailrigg FM was awarded an extended licence to transmit across Lancaster and Morecambe for a week as part of the university's 40th anniversary celebrations. Bailrigg FM moved into its current studios in Furness College in 2006. As part of the university's Alumni Fund, it received £8,500 in funding to purchase outside broadcast equipment.

In 2013 Bailrigg FM was awarded £65,000 in Capex funds from LUSU in order to renovate their studios.

It was announced by LUSU that Bailrigg FM would be stripped of funding for its license due to "organisation sustainability" plans. Due to widespread disapproval this decision was ultimately reversed.

On 7 December 2022, after almost 17 years of broadcasting on 87.7 MHz, Bailrigg FM's FM license was amended, changing its frequency to 95.3 MHz.

== Awards ==
=== Student Radio Awards ===
The following are Student Radio Awards presented by the Student Radio Association

Year	Award	Content	Nominee	Result	Ref.
1996	Best Student Radio Station		Bailrigg FM	Nominated	
2002	Best Student Radio Station		Bailrigg FM	Nominated	
2003	Best Website Award		Peter Price	Gold	
2004	Best Station Sound		Bailrigg FM	Gold	
2005	Specialist Music Programming	'The Rachel Neilman Experience'	Rachel Neilman	Nominated	
2006	Best Journalistic Programming	'Newsbite'	Victoria Kirby	Silver	
2006	Best Comedy & Drama Programming	'Project ComCom'	Bailrigg FM	Nominated	
2007	Best Male Presenter		Kenny Donohue	Gold	
2007	Best Journalistic Programming	‘Travellers on campus’	Bailrigg FM News Team	Nominated	
2008	Best Outside Broadcast	'Roses'	Bailrigg FM	Bronze	
2012	Best Technical Achievement	'Bailrigg FM Field Switchboard'	Bailrigg FM	Gold	
2021	Best Technical Achievement	'Bailrigg FM Documentation Upgrades'	Bailrigg FM	Nominated	
2023	Best Event Programming	Battle of the Bands 2023	Bailrigg FM	Nominated	
2024	Best Interview	Hacker T Dog and Katie Thistleton Interview	Bailrigg FM	Bronze	
2025	Best Creative Speech Programming	The Sound of Nature	Anna Foster	Bronze	
2025	Kevin Greening Award for Creativity	The Sound of Nature	Anna Foster	Silver	
2025	Best Presenter		Erin Strom	Silver	
2025	Best Student Radio Station		Bailrigg FM	Bronze	

=== Amplify Awards ===
The following are Amplify Awards (formerly known as I Love Student Radio Awards) presented at the annual SRACon by the Student Radio Association.

Year	Award	Nominee	Result	Ref.
2014	Best Audience Initiative	Bailrigg FM	Highly Commended	
2014	Most Improved Station	Bailrigg FM	Won	
2014	Outstanding Contribution to Student Radio	Stephen Robinson	Won	
2018	Outstanding Contribution to Student Radio	Sam Possible	Nominated	
2018	Hero Of The Moment	Tom Pearson	Highly Commended	
2021	Media Collaboration of the Year	Bailrigg FM	Nominated	
2023	Outstanding Contribution	Riley Williams	Nominated	
2023	Best Station Culture	Bailrigg FM	Nominated	
2023	Most Improved Station	Bailrigg FM	Nominated	
2024	Best Student Media Collaboration	Bailrigg FM & University Radio York	Silver	
2024	Team of the Year	Bailrigg FM's Engineering Team	Bronze	
2025	Best Station Culture	Bailrigg FM	Gold	
2025	Student Radio Moment of the Year	"Bowland Tower Meets Students"	Gold	
2025	Most Committed Committee Member	Georgia Platt	Bronze	
2026	The Amplify Award	Erin Strom	Bronze	

=== Lancaster University Students' Union Awards ===
The following are awards presented by Lancaster University Students' Union.

Year	Award	Content	Nominee(s)	Result	Ref.
2014	Feature of the Year	'Brainwaves'	Bailrigg FM	Won	
2016	Bailrigg Show of the Year	'Later with Tom and Eden'		Nominated	
2016	Bailrigg Show of the Year		Mathew Gillings, Ollie Orton, Laura Wilkinson	Nominated	
2016	Bailrigg Show of the Year	'The LUCI Improv Hour'	Lancaster University Comedy Institute	Won	
2016	Bailrigg Show of the Year	'Desert Island Downloads'		Nominated	
2019	Best Entertainment/Lifestyle Content	'Monday Bailrigg Show'	Adam Bragan, Jonny Bentley	Nominated	
2019	Best Entertainment/Lifestyle Content	'The Summerfeld Chronicles'	Jordan Summerfield	Won	
2019	Best Design	'The Summerfeld Chronicles'	Jordan Summerfield	Nominated	
2019	Best Marketing	'The Summerfeld Chronicles'	Jordan Summerfield	Nominated	
2019	Best Marketing	'Wednesday Bailrigg Show Promotional Video'	Pascal Maguet, Alex George	Won	
2019	Best News/Politics Content	'Snowballing Out of Control?'	Kyle McKenzie	Won	
2019	Best Interview	'Rethink Valentine's'	Max Ell	Won	
2019	Best Innovation	'Rethink'	Max Ell, Luke Mader, Nick Hoffman	Won	
2019	Best Innovation	'LUCI 24 hour takeover'	Lancaster University Comedy Institute	Nominated	
2019	Best Live Coverage	'Lancaster City FC Coverage'	Jonny Bentley	Nominated	
2019	Best Sports Content	'Bailrigg Football Show'	Jonny Bentley	Nominated	
2019	Best Sports Content	'Kick Out @ 2'	Kyle McKenzie, Kamran Khan	Nominated	
2020	Best Sports Content	'Kick Out @ 2'	Kamran Khan	Nominated	
2020	Best Cultural Content	'K-Bops'	Quin Pitcher	Nominated	
2020	Best Entertainment/Lifestyle Content	'Choose Life'	Sophie Edwards, Finn Bracegirdle	Nominated	
2020	Best News/Politics Content	'Newsday Tuesday'	Dan Woodburn	Nominated	
2020	Best Live Coverage	'Union Elections'	Bailrigg FM	Nominated	
2020	Best Live Coverage	'General Election Coverage'	Bailrigg FM & SCAN	Won	
2020	Best Innovation	'Off Script Podcast'	Oliver Crisp	Nominated	
2020	Best Marketing & Design	'BFM Branding, Logos & Show Banners'	Angus Warrender	Nominated	
2020	Best Lockdown Content	'Afternoon T'	Tom Grayston	Won	
2021	Best Lockdown Content	'9 Years Time (Parody of 5 Years Time)'	Tom Grayston	Nominated	
2021	Best Entertainment/Lifestyle Content	'The Noughty Sesh'	Tom Grayston	Won	
2021	Best Marketing		Tom Grayston	Nominated	
2021	Best Marketing	'Bailrigg FM's Rebrand'	Edward Nokes	Won	
2021	Best Social Media	'A Queer On Camp'	Noah Katz	Nominated	
2021	Best Cultural Content	'A Queer On Camp'	Noah Katz	Won	
2021	Best News/Politics Content	'Newspeak'	Theo Hunt	Won	
2021	Best News/Politics Content		Theo Hunt/Lucy Whalen	Nominated	
2021	Best News/Politics Content		Lucy Whalen	Nominated	
2021	Best Podcast		Lucy Whalen	Nominated	
2021	Best Podcast		Lancaster Film Club Podcast	Nominated	
2021	Best Podcast	'Welcome to Lancaster'	Oliver Crisp	Won	
2021	Best Collaboration		Oliver Crisp	Nominated	
2021	Best Collaboration	'Freshers' Fair Live'	LA1TV and Bailrigg FM	Won	
2021	Best Live Coverage		BFM News Team	Nominated	
2021	Best Live Coverage	'Bailrigg's Summer Celebration'	Finn Bracegirdle and LA1TV	Nominated	
2021	Best Live Coverage		Finn Bracegirdle	Nominated	
2021	Best Innovation	'Bailrigg FM's Podcasting'	Theo Hunt/Oliver Crisp	Won	
2022	Best Innovation	'Bailrigg FM's Live Lounge'	Bailrigg FM	Won	
2022	Best Interview	'The Jack Threlfall Show'	Jack Threlfall	Won	
2022	Best Collaboration	'Roses'	Bailrigg FM & LA1TV	Won	
2023	Best Collaboration	Roses Media Coverage	Bailrigg FM, LA1TV, & SCAN	Won	
2023	Student Media Contributor of the Year		Riley Williams	Won	
2023	VP Societies & Media Award for Individual Achievement		Riley Williams	Nominated	
2023	Media Group of the Year		Bailrigg FM	Nominated	
2024	Best Media Feature	LUSU Election and Candidate Questions	Bailrigg FM & LA1TV		
2024	Collaboration of the Year	Battle of the Bands	Bailrigg FM & LA1TV		
2024	Equality and Diversity Award		Bailrigg FM		
2024	Media Group of the Year		Bailrigg FM		
2024	Society Exec Team Award		Bailrigg FM		

== Notable alumni ==
- Richard Allinson
- James May
- Paul Cornell
- Andy Serkis
- James Masterton
- Paul Dale
- Louis Barfe
- Ranvir Singh
