= Student television =

Student television may refer to:

- A student television station, one run by students
- The National Student Television Association (NaSTA)
- University of North Carolina at Chapel Hill Student Television
