= Roses Tournament =

British inter-university sports tournament

- Teams: Lancaster University; University of York
- First meeting: 1965
- Trophy: The Carter James Trophy

Statistics
- Most wins: Lancaster
- All-time record: 31 (Lancaster) – 28 (York) – 1 (draw)
- Website: roseslive.co.uk

The Roses Tournament is an annual varsity sports competition between Lancaster University and the University of York in England. It is often described as the largest inter-university sports tournament in Europe.

The tournament is organised by their respective Students' Unions, LUSU and York SU. It takes its name from the 15th-century civil war, the Wars of the Roses, between the House of Lancaster and the House of York. The counties of Lancashire and Yorkshire are traditionally symbolised by the red and the white rose respectively, although some York teams play in gold and black kits. The competition is held every year during the early May bank holiday weekend, alternating its venue between the two universities.

== History ==
The first event happened on 15 May 1965 after the Vice-Chancellor of York, Lord James of Rusholme, suggested a boat race between the two universities. The students amplified this idea and held a 5-day event with a variety of sports: rowing, table tennis, relay race, mixed field hockey, and tug of war. The winner of each of the sports received two points, and the losing vice-chancellor presented a trophy to the winning university. York won the inaugural tournament 13-5. The event has continued to increase in size since its founding, with new events added every year (2004 had 37 different sports). Live coverage of the event is broadcast every year by a collaboration between the two universities' student television stations YSTV and LA1:TV, and their two student radio stations, Bailrigg FM and University Radio York. The importance of non-sporting social activities at the event has also been increased, with organised events on the Friday and Saturday evenings.

In 1989, Roses celebrated its silver Jubilee with rugby, rowing, a boat race and tug of war some of the 30 sports. York won the tournament by 101-97 with a 3-1 win in the football securing the win.

In the 2012 tournament a stadium was used for the first time. The Rugby 1sts XV battled it out at Huntington Stadium, the home of the York City Knights. During the 2013 tournament York opted to use the same venue again, for the second year running.

The Lancaster University Men's Hockey Club 4th Team, Lancaster Bombers American Football team and the Lancaster Trampolining team were the only teams to remain unbeaten in the history of the tournament to date going into Roses 2012, however all three teams lost to their York counterparts in 2012.

For the 50th battle of the Roses in 2014, the tournament was hosted at Lancaster. Lancaster created a purpose built stadium for first time which hosted the opening and closing ceremony, as well as fixtures including women's rugby, men's rugby and archery.

The 2015 tournament was officially opened by England football team manager Roy Hodgson and Football Association chairman Greg Dyke. The opening ceremony, which featured a series of boxing matches dubbed 'Friday Night Fight Night', was watched by 1,000 people in the University of York's Central Hall, with a further 5,000 people watching on large screens across campus. It was also the first year that one university had scored more than 200 points; however more point scoring activities are present now compared to 50 years ago.

Esports were introduced to the tournament for the first time in 2016 in the form of League of Legends, Dota 2 and Counter-Strike: Global Offensive.

The 2018 tournament saw the introduction of dodgeball and golf to the competition, as won by the Lancaster Royals.

In March 2020 it was announced that the event would be cancelled due to the COVID-19 pandemic. However, a competition was held with the Roses tournament being replaced by a Virtual Roses tournament which was won by York.

Since the pandemic, Lancaster have dominated the competition, winning all five editions since 2022. This ongoing streak is also the first time that either university has won four or more consecutive tournaments. There had previously been five instances of three consecutive triumphs.

== Results ==
- Lancaster: 31 wins (25 home, 6 away)
- York: 28 wins (24 home, 4 away)
- Draws: 1 (1 at Lancaster, 0 at York)

| No. | Year | Host | Winner | | Runner-up | | Ref. |
|---|---|---|---|---|---|---|---|
| 1 | 1965 | York | York | 13 | Lancaster | 5 | |
| 2 | 1966 | Lancaster | Lancaster | | York | | |
| 3 | 1967 | York | York | | Lancaster | | |
| 4 | 1968 | Lancaster | Lancaster | | York | | |
| 5 | 1969 | York | York | | Lancaster | | |
| 6 | 1970 | Lancaster | Lancaster | | York | | |
| 7 | 1971 | York | York | | Lancaster | | |
| 8 | 1972 | Lancaster | Lancaster | | York | | |
| 9 | 1973 | York | Lancaster | | York | | |
| 10 | 1974 | Lancaster | Draw | | | | |
| 11 | 1975 | York | Lancaster | | York | | |
| 12 | 1976 | Lancaster | Lancaster | | York | | |
| 13 | 1977 | York | Lancaster | | York | | |
| 14 | 1978 | Lancaster | York | | Lancaster | | |
| 15 | 1979 | York | York | | Lancaster | | |
| 16 | 1980 | Lancaster | Lancaster | | York | | |
| 17 | 1981 | York | York | | Lancaster | | |
| 18 | 1982 | Lancaster | Lancaster | | York | | |
| 19 | 1983 | York | York | | Lancaster | | |
| 20 | 1984 | Lancaster | Lancaster | | York | | |
| 21 | 1985 | York | Lancaster | | York | | |
| 22 | 1986 | Lancaster | Lancaster | | York | | |
| 23 | 1987 | York | York | 104.0 | Lancaster | 69.0 | |
| 24 | 1988 | Lancaster | Lancaster | | York | | |
| 25 | 1989 | York | York | 101.0 | Lancaster | 97.0 | |
| 26 | 1990 | Lancaster | Lancaster | 170.0 | York | 68.0 | |
| 27 | 1991 | York | York | | Lancaster | | |
| 28 | 1992 | Lancaster | York | 100.5 | Lancaster | 90.5 | |
| 29 | 1993 | York | York | | Lancaster | | |
| 30 | 1994 | Lancaster | Lancaster | | York | | |
| 31 | 1995 | York | York | 122.0 | Lancaster | 99.0 | |
| 32 | 1996 | Lancaster | Lancaster | | York | | |
| 33 | 1997 | York | York | | Lancaster | | |
| 34 | 1998 | Lancaster | Lancaster | | York | | |
| 35 | 1999 | York | York | | Lancaster | | |
| 36 | 2000 | Lancaster | Lancaster | 151.5 | York | 77.5 | |
| 37 | 2001 | York | York | 132.5 | Lancaster | 102.5 | |
| 38 | 2002 | Lancaster | York | 120.5 | Lancaster | 119.5 | |
| 39 | 2003 | York | York | 132.0 | Lancaster | 101.0 | |
| 40 | 2004 | Lancaster | Lancaster | 145.0 | York | 107.0 | |
| 41 | 2005 | York | York | 159.5 | Lancaster | 91.5 | |
| 42 | 2006 | Lancaster | Lancaster | 134.0 | York | 115.0 | |
| 43 | 2007 | York | York | 143.0 | Lancaster | 103.0 | |
| 44 | 2008 | Lancaster | York | 124.0 | Lancaster | 122.0 | |
| 45 | 2009 | York | York | 194.5 | Lancaster | 79.5 | |
| 46 | 2010 | Lancaster | Lancaster | 157.5 | York | 105.5 | |
| 47 | 2011 | York | York | 176.5 | Lancaster | 104.5 | |
| 48 | 2012 | Lancaster | Lancaster | 156.5 | York | 131.5 | |
| 49 | 2013 | York | York | 180.5 | Lancaster | 105.5 | |
| 50 | 2014 | Lancaster | Lancaster | 183.5 | York | 142.5 | |
| 51 | 2015 | York | York | 227.5 | Lancaster | 141.5 | |
| 52 | 2016 | Lancaster | Lancaster | 212.5 | York | 138.5 | |
| 53 | 2017 | York | York | 206.5 | Lancaster | 159.5 | |
| 54 | 2018 | Lancaster | Lancaster | 225.5 | York | 126.5 | |
| 55 | 2019 | York | York | 209.5 | Lancaster | 143.5 | |
| —N/a | 2020 | Cancelled due to the COVID-19 pandemic. | | | | | |
| —N/a | 2021 | Cancelled due to the COVID-19 pandemic. | | | | | |
| 56 | 2022 | Lancaster | Lancaster | 241.0 | York | 102.0 | |
| 57 | 2023 | York | Lancaster | 200.0 | York | 126.0 | |
| 58 | 2024 | Lancaster | Lancaster | 217.5 | York | 126.5 | |
| 59 | 2025 | York | Lancaster | 184.0 | York | 160.0 | |
| 60 | 2026 | Lancaster | Lancaster | 241.5 | York | 120.5 | |

== Current list of sports ==
The following sports were included in the 2023 edition of the tournament:

- American football
- Archery
- Badminton
- Ballroom dance
- Basketball
- Canoe polo
- Cheerleading
- Climbing
- Cricket
- Cross Country
- Cycling
- Dance
- Darts
- Debating
- Equestrian
- Esports
- Fencing
- Football*
- Futsal
- Golf
- Handball
- Hockey
- Indoor hockey
- Korfball
- Lacrosse
- Martial Arts
- Motorsport
- Mountain Biking
- Netball
- Pokémon
- Pole fitness
- Pool
- Powerlifting
- Rowing
- Rugby union
- Sailing
- Snooker
- Snowsports
- Squash
- Swimming
- Table tennis**
- Tennis
- Trampolining
- Ultimate Frisbee
- Underwater hockey
- Volleyball
- Water polo
- Whitewater canoeing

* In addition to the University teams, football and netball also includes matches between each university's intercollegiate league champions. Postgraduate and medical society teams have also appeared in some years.

** In 2023 table tennis is the 'Vice Chancellors' Fixture', with the sides consisting of the vice chancellor and the sports president. In past years, croquet is usually played between "executive" teams comprising some combination of chancellors, vice-chancellors and Students' Union presidents, and does not contribute any points to the overall score. In some years, this has been replaced with crown green bowls.

== During the COVID-19 pandemic ==
=== Virtual Roses 2020 ===
==== Summer Edition ====
Due to the COVID-19 pandemic, the 2020 edition of the annual Roses Tournament to be held at Lancaster University was cancelled. As an alternative, Lancaster University Students' Union and York University Students' Union created a virtual tournament on Facebook. Events took place in the form of challenges that participants would have to provide photographic or video evidence for. Challenges of were judged by Lancaster SU Vice-President for Activities, Victoria Hatch and York Sport Union President, Maddi Cannell. The tournament took place between 1–2 May 2020 and was won by York by a score of 2337-1971.

Charity fundraising was also done alongside the tournament, with a total of over £5000 being raised.

===== Opening ceremony =====
The opening ceremony for the tournament featured a number of video performances being uploaded to the Virtual Roses 2020 Facebook page on 1 May 2020. Sets were performed by Emily Millard, Lancaster's Brass Quintet, Lancaster's Clarinet Choir, Lancaster's Chamber Choir, Hamza Dalvi, Victoria Hatch, and Lancaster University Comedy Institute.

===== Events =====
There was a mix of events that were open to all, events that were only open to members of specific societies, and events only competed by specific individuals. Most events awarded 50 points for 1st place, 30 points for 2nd place, and 20 points for 3rd place. Some events awarded points for the number of participants each University had. Some events awarded 100 points for the winner.

==== Winter Edition ====
A winter edition of the Virtual Roses Tournament, to take place on Lancashire Day (27 November), was announced via the same Facebook page that hosted the summer edition on 17 November 2020. Lancaster won by a score of 40-22.

=== Roses Unlocked 2021 ===
Due to the COVID-19 pandemic, the 2021 edition of the annual Roses Tournament to be held at York University was cancelled. As an alternative, Lancaster University Students' Union and York University Students' Union created "Roses Unlocked". Events took place in the form of a pentathlon consisting of a sprint, running, a static erg, a swim and a cycle between most uni sports teams and were live-streamed online. The tournament took place between 30 April–2 May 2021. York won by a score of 115-57.

== See also ==
- List of British and Irish varsity matches
