= Imperial College Television =

Coordinates: 51.5001°N 0.1780°W

- Country: United Kingdom
- Affiliates: Imperial College London; Imperial College Union; NaSTA

History
- Launched: October 1969
- Closed: 2021
- Former names: STOIC (1969-2014)

Imperial College Television (abbreviated ICTV), formerly STOIC (Student Television of Imperial College) was a British student television station operated by Imperial College London, which existed between 1969 and 2021.

== History ==
STOIC has its origins in January 1969 when the Imperial College set up plans with the Electrical Engineering Department to provide cameras for the college's 20-Minute Talks. By October 1969, the Imperial College had formed the basis of STOIC and on 17 February 1970, the first IC Newsreel was broadcast. STOIC mainly produced news programmes; one of its notable figures in the black-and-white era being Trevor Philips, who later had a professional television career at London Weekend Television for a short time. By 1979, the facilities have gained their first portable cameras, enabling outside recordings. The station also contributed to the ILEA Educational Television Service that existed in the same decade, as STOIC started gaining relevance due to its interviews with celebrities. In the summer of 1979, STOIC bought colour equipment, enabling the channel to begin broadcasting in the new format. The studio was re-equipped to feature the U-Matic tape system. The colour broadcast started during an edition of IC News presented by James Miller.

In 1998, the channel started using the name SiCTV for production unit, including the news service. STOIC started streaming its content online in January 2002, becoming the first student television station in the UK to do so. Colin Grimshaw archived all of the videotapes from destruction in 2009.

As of a 2006 review of student television stations by The Independent, STOIC/ICTV had the most sophisticated facilities in terms of technology; it was producing twice-weekly news bulletins as well as sketch shows at the time.

In 2023 it was discovered that ICTV shut down in 2021 due to side effects from the pandemic, and later, due to the lack of core officers for the 2022-2023 academic year. Since at least 2018, the staff number was of just three, making it hard to attract new viewers.
