= SURGEtv =

Surge TV
- Broadcast area: United Kingdom; Worldwide (online)
- Affiliates: NaSTA
- Headquarters: Southampton, Hampshire

Ownership
- Owner: University of Southampton Students' Union

History
- Launched: 2006

Links
- Website: www.susu.tv

Surge TV (Surge Television) is a student television station that serves the students of the University of Southampton. The station was commissioned in 2006 and is a union group within the University of Southampton Students' Union, alongside its sister radio station Surge Radio. The station has produced and aired a variety of different programmes, including news coverage, special event programming, and original short films and series. Notable shows and films include the 2013 fantasy series Elfrida and the 2015 documentary The Gay Word. The station currently creates online contents available via YouTube and Facebook.

== History ==
The origins of SUSUtv began when the idea was originally submitted in 2001 but was rejected at the time. The idea resurfaced in 2006 when the union began to start producing video for their website. As a result, SUSUtv was formed in 2007 so that students could make these ever more ambitious videos. The following year the station joined the NaSTA. In 2010 the station adopted its current logo and bright green colour scheme, moved to its first studio in the bottom of the Students' Union building. The station was the first student television station to broadcast in HD for their 2010 sabbatical elections special.

Between 2013 and 2016, the station successfully crowdfunded and produced the fantasy drama Elfrida, and aired documentaries such as The Gay Word. These combined have received over 100,000 views on social media channels.

In 2016, the SUSU organisation rebranded as “Us.” The station decided not to change its name, however, since it already had a distinctive identity. 2017 saw the largest graphical rebrand of the station to date, introducing the iteration of the "S" power button logo still in use today. 2017-20 is regarded as one of the most productive periods for the station, with a distinctive pivot towards short films and news content. Shorts such as December Heat and the award-winning Constellations were made during this time.

The lockdowns following the COVID-19 pandemic coincided with a loss of station members, partially due to many graduating during this period. 2019 and 2020 both saw live coverage of national elections in the UK and US.

SURGEtv officially announced its rebranding in August 2021, shortly before Freshers 2021. It has since produced live programming and sports coverage for the University, including the 2023 varsity games, and charity events with the SUABC boxing club.

== Awards ==
Over the years, SUSUtv has won a number of awards including at a national level at the annual NaSTA Awards.

Year	Award Ceremony	Category	Nominated Video	Placing
2008	NaSTA	Best Light Entertainment	Winchester Campus Piece	Highly Commended
2011	NaSTA	Best Animation	Animation	Highly Commended
2011	NaSTA	Best Comedy	Petty Crimes	Won
2011	NaSTA	Best Drama	Flat 443	Won
2011	NaSTA	Best Music to Video	Arp Attack - 'Crocodile Tears'	Highly Commended
2012	NaSTA	Best Animation	Bedtime Kevin!	Won
2012	NaSTA	Best Station Marketing	Marketing	Won
2012	NaSTA	Best Technical	Technical	Highly Commended
2014	NaSTA	Best Comedy	Marshall and Hart	Won
2014	NaSTA	Best Live	SUSU Elections Night Live 2013	Won
2014	NaSTA	Best Music	'Damage Control'	Highly Commended
2014	NaSTA	Best Writing	The Society	Won
2015	NaSTA	Best Light Entertainment	SUSUtv does Top Gear	Won
2015	NaSTA People's Choice Awards	Content Innovation Award	SUSU Elections Night Live 2014	Won
2016	NaSTA	Best Documentary	Radar - Britain's Shield	Highly Commended
2016	NaSTA	Best Live	SUSU Elections Night Live 2015	Highly Commended
2016	NaSTA People's Choice Awards	Content Innovation Award	SUSU Elections Night Live 2015	Won
2017	NaSTA	Best Writing	Blind Love	Highly Commended
2017	NaSTA People's Choice Awards	Content Innovation Award	Women In Sport Live	Won
2017	NaSTA People's Choice Awards	Live Award	EU Referendum Live	Runner up
2017	NaSTA People's Choice Awards	On-Screen Talent Award	Tom Pethick	Won
2017	NaSTA People's Choice Awards	Open Award	Where do Snowmen Go in the Summer?	Runner up
2017	NaSTA People's Choice Awards	Technical Innovation Award	Developing VT Manager	Won
2017	NaSTA People's Choice Awards	Unsung Hero	Dave Williams	Won
2017	National Student Society Awards	Best Media Society	N/A	Highly Commended
2018	NaSTA	Best On-Screen Talent		
2019	NaSTA	Best Station Marketing		Won
2019	NaSTA	Mars el-Brogy Award		Won
2019	NaSTA	Best Post Production		Highly Commended
2019	NaSTA	Best Writing		Highly Commended
