= Surge Radio =

Student radio station of the University of Southampton

Coordinates: 50°54′22.57″N 1°23′45.64″W

Southampton; England
- Broadcast area: Worldwide (online), Southampton, United Kingdom (on campus)

Programming
- Language: English
- Format: Student radio, internet radio

History
- First air date: February 1976
- Former names: Radio Heffalump (1976–1977); Radio Glen (1977–2001); SURGE Radio (2001–2018); Surge Radio (2018–present)
- Former frequencies: 1287 AM (1999–2010); 87.7 FM (2005–2016)

Links
- Website: surgeradio.co.uk

Surge Radio is an English student radio station based at the University of Southampton. Founded in 1976 as Radio Heffalump, the station was renamed Radio Glen the following year and originally broadcast from the university's Glen Eyre Halls complex.

Surge Radio broadcasts online from its website, but is also played in select buildings of the University. Alumni of Surge Radio include broadcasters Spencer Kelly, Scott Mills and Chris Stark.

== History ==
Surge Radio began broadcasting in the autumn term of 1976 as a pirate station, before it was agreed in March 1977 to form a legal radio station at Glen Eyre. The station was founded as Radio Glen and initially broadcast from a studio in Glen Eyre "F-Block", transmitting on AM by means of induction-loop systems installed on building rooftops on 963, and later on 1602, KHz.

The early 1980s brought major developments, including the station's first regular service of student news, a consistent programme schedule, the construction of a second studio and new music library, refurbishment of the main studio with cartridge machines and a new student-built mixer, and a sung jingle package. The station relocated to larger premises in New Terrace in 1998.

In 2000 the station began broadcasting on 1287AM, having before only reached Glen Eyre tenants, and in 2001 it commenced FM transmissions for one week per year. Also in 2001, the station was re-branded as SURGE, an acronym of Southampton University Radio from Glen Eyre.

In 2003 the station won its first Student Radio Award, awarded by the UK Student Radio Association: station Webmaster Nicholas Humfrey picked up the Technical Innovation Award for his "Total Request" system, while the website was awarded silver in the Website of the Year category. Surge News was founded in February 2004 by James Laidler, and in 2005 won first place in the SRA News & Talk category, with Nick Bevan picking up Surge's third award, for Newcomer of the Year. In June 2005, Surge successfully received funding of £25,000 from SUSU for construction of a new studio in the Students' Union building on the University's Highfield Campus, which was completed and launched in October. In April 2006 the station hosted the Student Radio Conference, and in June hosted the BBC 6 Music Breakfast Show with Phill Jupitus. Surge picked up an award for Best Entertainment Show in November 2006, when Nick Bevan, Thomas Morgan and Zander Bell won with "The Nick & Mogs Show".

In the 2011 Student Radio Awards Surge's Technical Manager Ben Morton received two nominations for the station, both in the category of Best Technical Achievement; he won the silver award at the ceremony for his work on the Surge Facebook application. Surge celebrated its 40th birthday in 2016.

In February 2017, a rare EMI BTR-3 tape recorder, previously used at Abbey Road Studios in the 1960s, was recovered by members of the Surge committee from the old Glen Eyre Halls studio after information on its whereabouts was provided by former Radio Glen Technical Manager Henry Walmsley, who had used the machine at the premises throughout the 1990s. The BTR-3 was donated to Abbey Road in April 2017, and in exchange, Surge were invited to broadcast from their new 'Front Room' studio. This made Surge the first group to use the Front Room studio, and the first student radio station to ever broadcast from Abbey Road Studios; the broadcast took place on 13 April 2017.

The station was heavily affected by the COVID-19 pandemic and the ensuing lockdowns; its final broadcast was on the evening of 13 March 2020, which coincided with the Southampton Student Film Festival. While the station was originally expected to begin broadcasting again during the 2021-2022 academic year, permanent broadcasting resumed in an online-only format in July 2022. Surge saw both its membership and funding decrease during the pandemic, however membership significantly increased in the 2022/23 academic year.

== Committee ==
The Surge Radio committee are in charge of running the station and are elected at the end of each academic year for the following academic year by current members of the station. Since 2022, Surge Radio & Television have been combined into a single society with a shared committee. The current Station Manager of Surge is Miko Lisiak.

== Studios ==
Surge Radio, along with Surge TV, operate from two main studios and various facilities through the University of Southampton.

=== Radio Studio ===
The Radio Studio is Surge Radio's live broadcast studio. Studio 1 has four microphones and a mixing desk, and the majority of shows on the schedule take place within Studio 1. Studio 1 is also used for live music sessions.

=== Podcast Studio ===
The Podcast Studio is Surge Radio's podcast studio; it is primarily used as a recording suite for podcasts, news bulletins, station sound and original music.

== Student Radio Awards ==
Surge Radio has been nominated for, and won, many Student Radio Awards since they were launched in 1995.

| Year | Nominated work | Category | Award | Notes | Ref. |
|---|---|---|---|---|---|
| 2003 | Total Request System | Technical Innovation Award | Gold | Awarded to Nicholas Humfrey | |
| 2003 | surgeradio.co.uk | Website of the Year | Silver | Awarded to Sven Latham and Nicholas Humfrey | |
| 2003 | Matty in the Morning | Best Entertainment Show | Nominated | Awarded to Matt Treacy and Charlotte Scarbourgh | |
| 2004 | Nicholas Humfrey | Best Technical Achievement | Silver | | |
| 2004 | University Swap | Best News and Talk | Nominated | Awarded to Matt Treacy and Val Mellon | |
| 2004 | Matt Treacy | Best Male | Nominated | | |
| 2004 | Surge | Station of the Year | Nominated | | |
| 2005 | Nick Bevan | Newcomer of the Year | Gold | | |
| 2005 | Surge News | News & Talk | Gold | | |
| 2005 | Alex Duffy | Best Male | Nominated | | |
| 2005 | Surge Mobile Phone Request System | Best Technical Achievement | Nominated | Awarded to Nicholas Humfrey | |
| 2005 | Surge | Best Off-air Promotion and Imaging | Nominated | | |
| 2006 | The Nick & Mogs Show | Best Entertainment Show | Gold | Awarded to Nick Bevan, Thomas Morgan and Zander Bell | |
| 2006 | Elections Night Live | Best Live Event/Outside Broadcast | Bronze | | |
| 2006 | Surge Newsweek | Best Journalistic Programme | Bronze | Awarded to James Laidler and Kate Jowett | |
| 2006 | Surge | Best Technical Innovation | Nominated | | |
| 2007 | Surge Newsweek | Best Journalistic Programming | Silver | | |
| 2007 | surgeradio.co.uk | Best Technical Innovation | Silver | | |
| 2007 | Surge | Best Marketing & Branding | Silver | | |
| 2008 | The Student Soundtrack | Best Entertainment | Nominated | | |
| 2009 | SurgeCart and Podcast Generator | Best Technical Achievement | Bronze | Awarded to Jason Allen | |
| 2009 | Kate Harrington and Jason Allen | Best Student Radio Chart Show | Nominated | | |
| 2009 | Surge Newsweek | Best Journalistic Programming | Nominated | | |
| 2010 | Surge Newsweek | Best Journalistic Programming | Nominated | | |
| 2011 | Total Request Facebook Application | Best Technical Achievement | Silver | Awarded to Ben Morton | |
| 2011 | Outside Broadcast System | Best Technical Achievement | Nominated | | |
| 2012 | Emma Real-Davies | Best Female | Nominated | | |
| 2013 | Emma Real-Davies | Best Female | Bronze | | |
| 2014 | Emma Real-Davies | Best Female | Nominated | | |
| 2014 | Surge | Best Marketing & Station Sound | Nominated | | |
| 2014 | Surge’s Online Redevelopment | Best Technical Achievement | Nominated | Awarded to Ben Morton | |
| 2015 | Toby Leveson | Best Newcomer | Nominated | | |
| 2015 | Surge's 48 Hour Marathon | Best Live Event or Outside Broadcast | Nominated | | |
| 2016 | Don't Touch Me I'm Famous | Best Entertainment Programme | Nominated | Awarded to Toby Leveson and Cameron Meldrum | |
| 2016 | The Lowdown with Tom Cross | Best Entertainment Programme | Gold | Awarded to Tom Cross | |
| 2016 | Tom Cross | Best Male | Silver | | |
| 2017 | Surge's 48 Hour Marathon | Best Live Event or Outside Broadcast | Nominated | | |
| 2017 | Surge's Jailbreak Coverage | Best Live Event or Outside Broadcast | Silver | | |
| 2017 | Surge's SRA Chart Show | Best Student Radio Chart Show | Nominated | | |
| 2017 | Georgia Rytina with John Giddings | Best Interview | Nominated | Awarded to Georgia Rytina | |
| 2017 | The Union | Best Speech Programming | Nominated | | |
| 2017 | Teeny Tiny Toby Time | Best Entertainment Programme | Nominated | Awarded to Toby Leveson | |
| 2017 | Surge's Jailbreak Coverage | Best Multiplatform Initiative | Silver | | |
| 2018 | Surge Radio’s Alexa Skill & Facebook Chatbot | Best Technical Achievement | Nominated | | |

== I Love Student Radio Awards ==
The I Love Student Radio Awards are a separate awards ceremony held every year at the Student Radio Conference that aim to celebrate and reward the commitment of individuals and teams that work in student radio.

| Year | Nominated work | Category | Award | Notes | Ref. |
|---|---|---|---|---|---|
| 2018 | Surge News Team | Team of the Year | Won | | |
| 2019 | Surge Podcasts | Best Audience Initiative | Highly Commended | | |
| 2019 | Jack Challinor | Most Committed Committee Member | Highly Commended | | |

== See also ==
- Student Radio Association
- SUSUtv
- Wessex Scene
- University of Southampton Students' Union
- University of Southampton
