= British Tape Recorder =

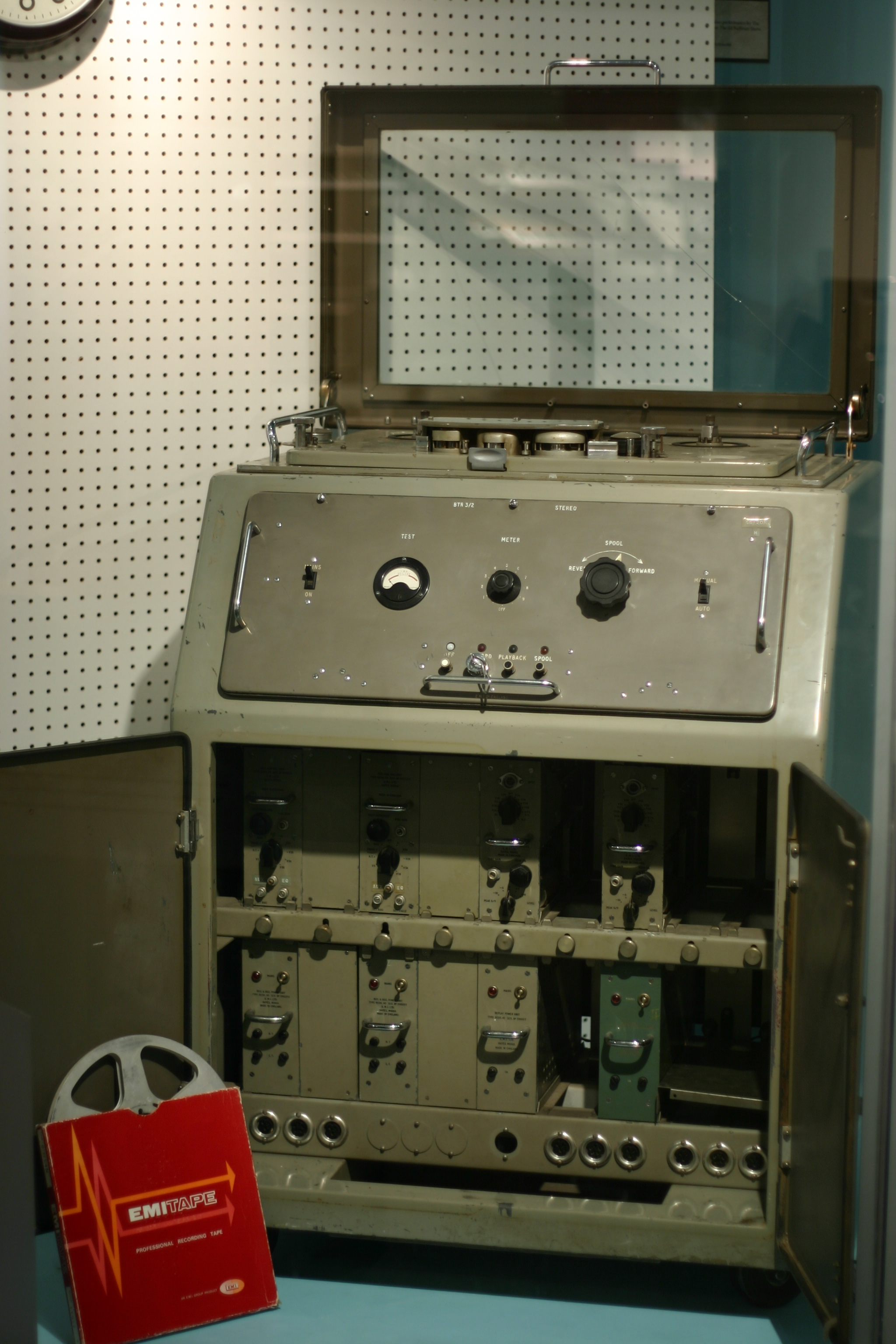
EMI BTR-3

British Tape Recorders or BTR machines were reel-to-reel audio tape recorders initially made by EMI in England after World War II. They were the first magnetic tape recorders to be manufactured in Britain, and their design imitated that of the tape recorders used by the Germans during the war. Because these multi-track recorders were painted EMI green, they then became known as the "Green Machines".

The first model made was named the BTR1. The BTR1 machines were first created in 1947, but superseded by the BTR2 mono machine in 1952. The BTR2 was made in greater quantity, being used not only at EMI studios but at the BBC. Many studios later purchased ex-BBC units, so quite a few were found in non-EMI London studios. The BTR3 recorder was initially intended to support 2 or 4 tracks, but the only machines produced were the stereo (2-track) machines, the 4-track version having been rejected at the prototype stage. Only a few of these BTR3s were built, and the only known use of them is at the Abbey Road Studios during the 1960s, where they were used for all stereo recording and disc mastering.

A BTR3 tape recorder, previously used at Abbey Road, was found by former Radio Glen Technical Manager Henry Walmsley, and members of Surge Radio, the student-run radio station of the University of Southampton, at one of the university's Halls of Residence (Glen Eyre Halls) in February 2017. It had been in use at the station—where it was known as 'The Beatle'—until around 2001.

The TR90 was a smaller, more portable unit. It was available in a stereo version, and was used professionally on EMI Remote recordings, as well as at Hayes, EMI's manufacturing complex.

Mono and twin-track BTR reel-to-reel recording machines were used in the making of the first two Beatles albums. Mono and stereo BTR machines were used to mix down the 4 and 8 track masters of later albums recorded on Telefunken, Studer and 3M multi-track machines.

The Otari company made a BTR-5 model recording machine, the initials standing for Broadcast Tape Recorder.
