= Paul Dale =

Paul Dale, born in 1970, has played a pivotal role in shaping the digital landscape of ITV plc, the oldest and largest commercial television network in the UK. Appointed as the first-ever Chief Technology Officer (CTO) on the ITV management board in July 2010, Dale has been instrumental in driving ITV's technological advancement and digital transformation.

Under Dale's leadership, ITV was recognized with the "Global Innovation" award by Citrix, highlighting the network's pioneering approach to IT delivery. His efforts in Business IT Transformation were further acknowledged when he was a panelist at Google's Atmosphere on Tour event in London in 2012. Additionally, Dale's active engagement and frequent content sharing on social media platforms like Twitter earned him a spot among the Top 50 Global Social CIOs by The Huffington Post in 2013.

Dale's career is marked by a series of significant roles and achievements. From 2011 to 2013, he served as a Board Director for YouView, a joint venture among various UK media entities, and for Freesat, a collaboration between the BBC and ITV plc. He was also a council member for the Digital TV Group during the same period.

Prior to joining ITV, Dale had an extensive career in the media and technology sector. He was the CTO of the Malaysian pay-TV operator Astro, where he led the company's transformation into an innovative platform. His media career began in 1991, and over the years, he gained experience in various capacities, including as the BBC’s first controller of Future Media and Technology, and earlier roles at British Interactive Broadcasting and NDS.

== Early life and education ==
Dale grew up and went to school in Workington, Cumberland (now Cumbria). He attended Stainburn School and went on to Sellafield to complete and apprenticeship as an instrument mechanic.

He studied at Lancaster University.

== Career ==
=== Nuclear industry ===
Dale completed an apprenticeship as an instrument mechanic with BNFL at their Sellafield site.

=== Media industry ===
Dale started his media career in 1991.

He was founder and director of Bailrigg FM in 1994.

In 1995 he joined NDS at their Southampton Site as a Project Manager delivering CA and MPEG digital head ends.

In 2002 he was appointed as Technology Director at BSkyB in their Networked Media division.

In 2006 he joined the BBC as Controller of Future Media and Technology for BBC Vision.

In 2008 Dale was appointed CTO of Astro, Malaysia's DTH Satellite Pay TV Operator, based in Kuala Lumpur. It was under Paul's tenure as CTO that Astro B.yond was launched and introduced a Digital video recorder (The Astro B.yond PVR) on 1 June 2010, and later Video on Demand (VOD) and IPTV connectivity over his 24 months in Malaysia.

Paul Dale joined ITV in January 2011 as their first CTO and is part of the ITV Management Board and reported directly in to Adam Crozier.

In December 2013 Dale joined German TV Broadcaster ProSiebenSat.1 Media as their SVP, overseeing five digital businesses, Maxdome, ProSiebenSat.1 Digital, MyVideo, Ampya and Studio 71.

In November 2014 Dale joined multinational media and digital marketing communications company Dentsu Aegis Network as their Global Chief technology officer.

=== IT industry ===
Dale's first two years at ITV were defined by the "Workplace Refresh" project, an 18-month programme of work consisting of 9 projects that rolled out a leading edge, mobile, consumerised, virtualised and cloud based IT solution to the whole company. The project has been globally recognised by the likes of Apple, Google, Citrix and Gartner as "industry defining" and world leading in key IT trends.

Under Dale's tenure as CTO at ITV they were awarded the "Global Innovation" award by Citrix in recognition of their pioneering approach to IT delivery.

In 2012 Dale was awarded CIO Top 50 status by Tech Republic.

In May 2012 Dale was a panelist in Google's Atmosphere on Tour event in London discussing his role in Business IT Transformation.

In January 2013 Dale was stated as being one of the Top 50 Global Social CIO's by The Huffington Post. due to his "good frequent content" on Twitter (Paul Dale on X) and actively "engaging" in social networks.

== Other roles ==
- 2011 to 2013 Board Director, YouView, a joint venture among BBC, ITV plc, Channel 4, Channel 5, BT, TalkTalk, Arqiva and chaired by Lord Sugar
- 2011 to 2013 Board Director, Freesat, a joint venture between BBC and ITV plc
- 2011 to 2013 DTG Council Member

== Personal life ==
Dale is married to Tracy and has two sons, Joseph and Alexander.
