= Subtv (British TV channel) =

British interactive music television channel for universities

Subtv Limited.
- Type: Private
- Founded: 2003
- Founder: Peter Miles
- Headquarters: Victoria, London, United Kingdom,
- Area served: United Kingdom
- Key people: Simon Lent,Chairman. Nick Brown, COO
- Owner: Subtv Limited / SUBTVU Limited
- Number of employees: 20
- Website: www.sub.tv

Subtv is a British interactive music television channel and digital signage network tailored specifically for university students. Operating across the United Kingdom, the channel broadcasts to connected screens situated in high-footfall university areas such as students' unions, campus bars, cafes, libraries, and gyms.

The network reaches an estimated audience of 1.2 million students across more than 70 to 80 university venues nationwide.

== History ==
The Subtv channel began broadcasting in 2003 within student union venues up and down the country via its own cable television network. Subtv has a cable television network of 700 42' plasma screens that reach over 1.76 million 18-24 year olds, at 96 Universities within the UK.

On 12 May 2014 Subtv launched its new on-line stream of its current Music Television Channel. The channel itself is a copy of the feed that is broadcast within the University network, with the exception that it ignores any music videos that do not comply with OFCOM regulations.

Subtv now offer cross-platform advertising and promotional campaigns.

== jvtv Ltd ==
jvtv Holdings Limited is a holding company concentrating on the student market and the parent of bot SUBtv and Dot Mobile, a mobile virtual network operator aimed at students. Dot Mobile entered into administration on 18 March 2008.

== Programmes ==
Subtv launched a range of music programmes on 19 September 2011, signalling a move away from the standard "jukebox" mix of music that had been the channels stable diet for the previous 3 years. A website was launched at for its online presence for the Channel.

Current

- Subtv Chart Show - The UK weekly chart
- New Music Hour - New music video show
- Top 40 Mix - music videos
- British University Karting Championships - news from the current BUKC season
- Subtv Live - Live music performances, and interviews from bands or artists, presented by Tom McKeown & Ivan Berry
- Student Radio Chart - The weekly chart from the Student Radio Association
- Top 20 of.... - The Top 20 tracks of any previous year.
- The Best Of Subtv 2014 - The Top tracks selected by viewers.
- Subtv Music News - presented by Goubran Bahou
- US*A List Chart

Seasonal

- Top Spooky Tracks - Halloween themed music videos
- Christmas Hits - Christmas themed music videos
- Summer Classics - summer themed music videos
- The Best Of Subtv 20xx

In Production

- Subtv Music News - news from the world of music, presented by Goubran Bahou
- Subtv Live - Live music performances, and interviews from bands or artists, presented by Tom McKeown, and Ivan Berry

On Hiatus

- Live Nation Presents - Live Connection - Up coming bands live music performance
- BUKC - racing coverage from the British Universities Karting Championship.

== Presenters ==
Current

- Ivan Berry (2013 - )
- Sarah Lamptey (2014 - )
- Tom McKeown (2012 - )
- Goubran Bahou (2012 - )

Former

- Emily Benammar (2012)

== SubDC ==
In 2009 Subtv network in a minor way expanded with the introduction of the new and advanced Subtv Info digital signage network. Aimed specifically for University coverage, within high foot-fall areas of University buildings, departments, libraries, canteens, gyms and lecture theatres. This venture failed.

== Cable network broadcast technology ==
Content is stored locally on a network of servers installed at each installation. A Touch Screen accessible at each location allows for interaction with the application. Features include creating playlists of content from the catalogue, digital signage mode, DJ visuals and Sports Mode. Sports mode allow for the system to broadcast traditional TV via a TV tuner card. A distinct feature of the system is the two channel format, where 1 channel is used to display entertainment content and the other channel displays digital signage.

Stakeholders in Subtv's estate are encouraged to upload content to the screens installed in their environment, via a small website dedicated to content upload. In 2010 Subtv launched 'TouchScreen' an iPhone application, allowing consumers to select tracks and make dedications from their iPhone.

== See also ==
- Student television in the United Kingdom
- Digital signage
