= Hit Stix =

Toy electronic musical instrument

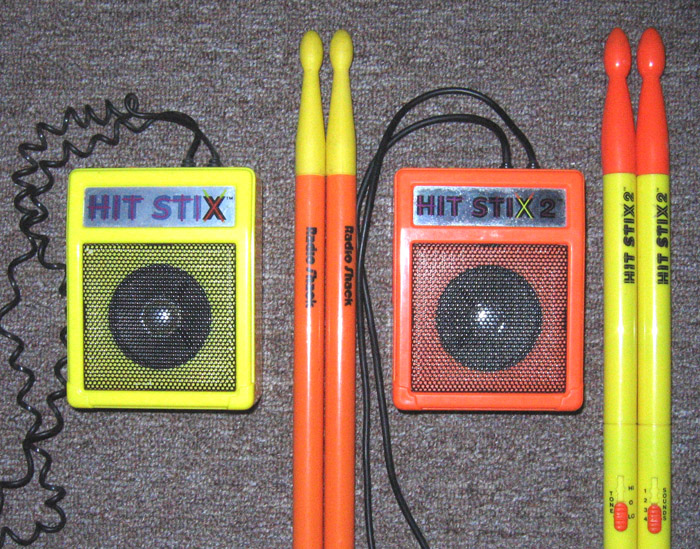
Hit Stix (left) and Hit Stix 2 toys

Hit Stix is a toy electronic musical instrument manufactured by Nasta and Radio Shack in the 1980s. A set of Hit Stix consists of two drum sticks which are tethered to a small amplifier by audio cables. When the drum sticks are thrust forward in mid air, mimicking actual drum playing, a snare drum sound effect is produced. A rapid succession of thrusts produces a drum roll. It is a common misconception that Hit Stix are meant to be hit against another surface. In fact, the sounds are produced simply by the motion of drumming and do not need to come in contact with any surface in order to produce a sound.

The Nasta company went public in 1987, and Hit Stix was its first television-advertised product. The Hit Stix instrument retailed for around $20 in 1987.

Hit Stix was succeeded by Hit Stix 2, which incorporates sound selection via sliders on each drum stick. The left stick adjusts the tone while the right selects either snare, tom, bass drum or phaser. The latter instrument was capable of producing 44 different percussive sounds. Both incarnations feature a yellow and orange color scheme and a belt clip which allows the drummer to wear the amplifier on his or her hip. The amplifier requires one 9-volt battery and has a wheel for volume control.

== Hit Keys ==
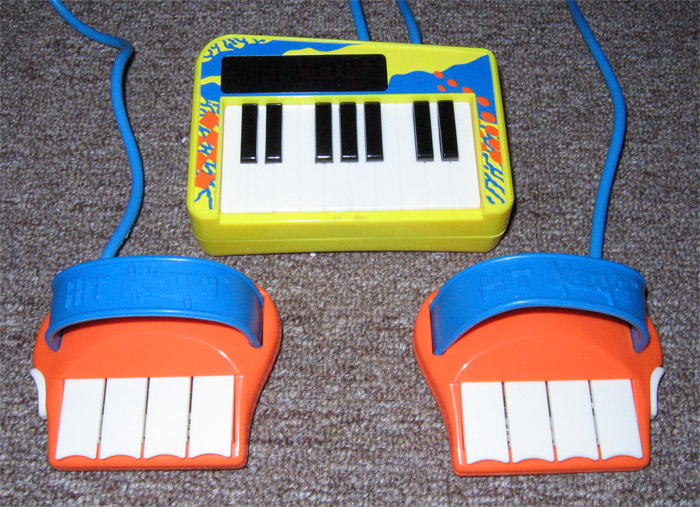
Hit Keys toy with halved keyboard

A third, much rarer and less popular, toy, manufactured by Nasta in 1989, is Hit Keys. Hit Keys features two halves of a keyboard, tethered again by audio cables to an amplifier worn on the hip. Each half of the remote keyboard is strapped to a different hand and played separately with one key for each finger and thumb. Hit Keys provides a choice of either piano or organ sounds. The amplifier requires one 9-volt battery and features a wheel for volume control. Collectively, Hit Stix, Hit Stix 2 and Hit Keys toys are known as Hitstruments.
