= LA1TV =

Student TV station at Lancaster University, UK

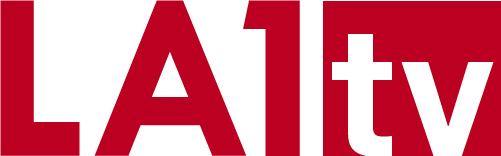
- Headquarters: Lancaster University, Bailrigg, Lancaster, LA1 4YW, United Kingdom

Ownership
- Owner: Lancaster University Students' Union
- Sister channels: Bailrigg FM (Radio)

History
- Launched: April 2008
- Former names: LUTube.tv, LA1:TV

Availability

Streaming media
- Website: www.la1tv.co.uk

LA1TV (officially the Lancaster University Students' Union Television Station, often simply LA1) is a non-profit student television station at Lancaster University. It is a constitutional part of the Lancaster University Students' Union, but is run as an independent student society. Some of LA1's current programmes include Sugar TV and the FTO (full time officers of the students union) catchup. LA1TV is currently run by Station Manager Lucas Abbott.

== History ==
The Lancaster University Student Television Station was founded by PhD students Michelle Ryan and Alberto Ramirez, alongside a changeable team of first-year undergraduates. It was granted LUSU constitutional status under the name LUTube.tv in April 2008. LUTube was given two main, and sometimes conflicting, objectives: to inform and entertain the student population at Lancaster University, and to give members of student media the chance to produce their own television shows. The station would be run by a team of executives, headed by a Station Manager, who would be elected each year from the student media membership. Though much has changed about the station since then, these constitutional bye laws have not.

LUTube.tv encountered several problems in its first years. The idea of a student television station was resisted by Lancaster University's legal counsel, by the university television service and by student radio station Bailrigg FM. LUTube also had to begin with limited resources, at one point resorting to the use of a camera phone. The extension “.tv” was not part of its initial branding, but had to be included because internet searches for “lutube” yielded an unfortunate number of pornographic sites. On top of this, exactly half of its pilot shows were never aired, often due to the crew's inexperience with video editing.

LUTube.tv was temporarily shut down in May 2011. One Station Manager commented with hindsight that the station had become notorious for unproductive and unimaginative activity, “producing lacklustre content irregularly”. The LUSU Vice President for Media and Communications at the time, however, said LUTube had not received enough credit for its work. Months later the station re-opened with a stronger brand culture and a new name, LA1:TV, which came from the campus postcode district. LA1 began by launching a number of what would become its longest-running shows, including campus news review The LA1 Show and nightlife programme Sugar TV. In its first quarter the new website received over 16,000 views. For its first six years, this website relied on a YouTube channel to display its videos, but LA1 has since developed software to host the entirety of its own content. The crew introduced its first regular live broadcast, the breakfast show Good Morning Lancaster, in 2014. Since then GML has aired every week during term time and has become an award-winning flagship programme.

LA1 now has a dedicated studio and office space on campus in Slaidburn House, and a stock of television hardware and branded materials. It regularly covers arts and sports events with the student societies at Lancaster University, including an annual outside broadcast of the largest intervarsity sports tournament in Europe. Some of its more irregular projects have included recording the thoughts of a Holocaust survivor, producing a documentary for the British Army, and interviewing Home Secretary Theresa May. LA1 also hosted Fresher TV for NaSTA in 2013 and the NaSTA Awards in 2015.

=== Awards ===
Year	Award	Nomination	Result
2011	NaSTA Award for Best Factual	The LA1 Show	Highly Commended
2013	NaSTA People's Choice Award for Best Live	Soundbooth Sessions	Shortlisted
2015	LUSU Journalist of the Year	Jessica Beard	Won
2015	NaSTA People's Choice Award for Technical Innovation	la1tv.co.uk	Won
2016	NaSTA People's Choice Award for Technical Innovation	la1tv.co.uk / DVR Bridge	Won
2016	NaSTA People's Choice Award for Unsung Hero	Tom Jenkinson	Won
2017	NaSTA Award for Technical Achievement	Roses 2016	Won
2017	NaSTA People's Choice Award for Live Award	Roses 2017	Won
2018	NaSTA Award for News & Current Affairs	General Election 2017	Won
2020	LUSU Best Entertainment / Lifestyle content	Timothy Lloyd-Judson - LA1TV Investigates The Mystery of the Spar Staircase	Won
2020	LUSU Best News / Politics Content	Amara Betts-Patel - LA1TV Investigates Caton Court	Won
2022	LUSU Best Roses Coverage	LA1TV	Won
2022	LUSU Best Collaboration	Roses 2023 with Bailrigg FM	Won
2022	LUSU Best Live Event	Roses 2023	Won
2023	LUSU Media Group of the Year	LA1TV	Won
2023	LUSU Best Collaboration	Roses Media Coverage (LA1TV, Bailrigg FM, SCAN)	Won
2023	LUSU Student Media Contributor of the Year	Riley Williams	Won

== Executive committee ==
Like all other student societies at Lancaster University, LA1 is organised and overseen by an internally elected group of Executive Committee members.

=== Roles ===
- Station Manager
- Deputy Station Manager
- Treasurer
- Secretary
- Safety and Welfare Officer
- Production Manager
- Live Events Coordinator
- Technical Manager
- Marketing Manager
- Social Secretary

== See also ==
- Student television in the United Kingdom
