= ILEA Educational Television Service =

- Country: United Kingdom
- Affiliates: Inner London Education Authority

History
- Launched: September 1968
- Closed: March 1979

The ILEA Educational Television Service was a cable service set up by the Inner London Education Authority. The service broadcast four channels of educational content over a cable network set up by the GPO. It ended in 1979, being replaced by a videotape service.

== History ==
The ILEA announced in 1967 that it would start delivering its television service in September 1968, initially scheduled to broadcast from the Laycock Television Centre. By 1969, the service was to be received by nearly all schools in its area of jurisdiction.

The Educational Television Service opened in September 1968 by initiative of Christopher Chataway. The station's first facilities were located at a converted high school in Highbury while studios at Battersea were being built. By arrangement with the GPO, using the GPO Television Service infrastructure for cable systems, the service ran on several channels on its cable network. The initial studios were also used for a re-enactment of The Man with the Flower in His Mouth in 1968, the same play that was played on the BBC's experimental television service in 1931.

In September 1969, the service began airing You in the Seventies. The series consisted of 30 25-minute plays depicting social realism of the time to teenagers and the problems they would face in adult life. The series ran for six terms and gained a reputation not only in London, but also in the UK as a whole, as well as in other parts of the world, entirely due to its plays.

In 1970, the Battersea studios became operational. These studios were opened by the service's chief engineer Walter Kemp, who had done the same for the facilities of the now-defunct Television Wales and the West in both Cardiff and Bristol. The service maintained high production standards, and the equipment was of broadcast quality. Programmes, especially those aimed at children, were on par with BBC and ITV productions. The studios consisted of two buildings at first, a studio block and a production block. These were later joined by a third building, housing a publishing block. Glyn Edwards produced a News at 1066 special programme covering the Battle of Hastings, as well as interviews with Victorian-age advertising illustrations, a real-life foot messenger on the speed of the delivery of news, and a game show where contestants found meaning in "meaningless" advertising slogans. He also favoured Sesame Street, which was being rejected by the BBC and ITV, and collaborated with Brian Kenny to produce Music Alive, The New Soundscape and World Music. These programmes featured music that was vetoed by BBC Radio, featuring sessions from Soft Machine, its spin-off Matching Mole, Kevin Coyne, Bridgit St. John and John Martyn. There were also proto-music videos with tracks from Frank Zappa, Captain Beefheart, Lou Reed and David Bowie set to visuals.

Other programmes produced by the ILEA Educational Television Service from the Battersea studios included Career Choices, Cities (focused on geography with a secondary school audience), Eclair (French language education), ILEA Reports (monthly talking head panel for teachers), London Magazine (aimed at primary school students with local topics of general interest), Primary Maths, Primary Science, Stimulus For Writing, Teaching The Less Able (for teachers), West Indian English (aiming at teachers adapting to new vernacular coming from the Caribbean), The World Expands (history series about the Age of Discovery, profiling Christopher Columbus, Vasco da Gama, Ferdinand Magellan among others), and You In The Seventies.

The ILEA service broadcast on channels 2, 3 and 4 of the GPO cable network, with programming aimed at schools. A separate service on channel 7 aimed at higher education produced by ULAVC had programmes produced from its own facilities at 11 Bedford Square. The cable network used the VHF standard and was barely capable of delivering colour television signals. Around 1977, an experimental colour broadcast was done on channel 2, likely using a colour camera loaned by the ULAVC. However, the service remained monochrome until its closure, diminishing its impact to students accustomed to watching colour television.

The privatisation of the GPO and its conversion to British Telecom led to the end of the service in March 1979. By this time, many of the monitors purchased for the service were nearing the end of their useful lives. ILEA Educational Television moved to a videotape service, having ordered 1000 video cassette recorders to this end, and providing greater flexibility compared to a linear television service. By the end of 1979, more than 75% of ILEA area schools had obtained such machines, thanks to a deal with a commercial rental company which offered discount prices. The ILEA was abolished in 1990.
