= York Student Television =

Coordinates: 53.946269°N 1.055447°W

- Country: United Kingdom
- Affiliates: University of York; YUSU; NaSTA

Ownership
- Sister channels: URY (radio)

History
- Launched: 21 November 1967

Links
- Website: ystv.co.uk

Availability

Streaming media
- Website: Watch

York Student Television (abbreviated YSTV) is England's oldest student television station. Founded in 1967, the station is based at the University of York, with its studio in James College. YSTV once held the world record for longest continuous television broadcast under a single director, and is a long-standing member of the National Student Television Association (NaSTA). YSTV creates and produces a wide range of shows, both independently and in collaboration with other university societies.

Recent shows include Tea Time Chat, a weekly magazine and politics show; YorKitchen, a cookery series; YSTV Sessions, an acoustic music show; various live coverage of on and off-campus events including extensive broadcasting of Roses 2017, and irregular reports on local events under the umbrella of YSTV Reports.

== History ==
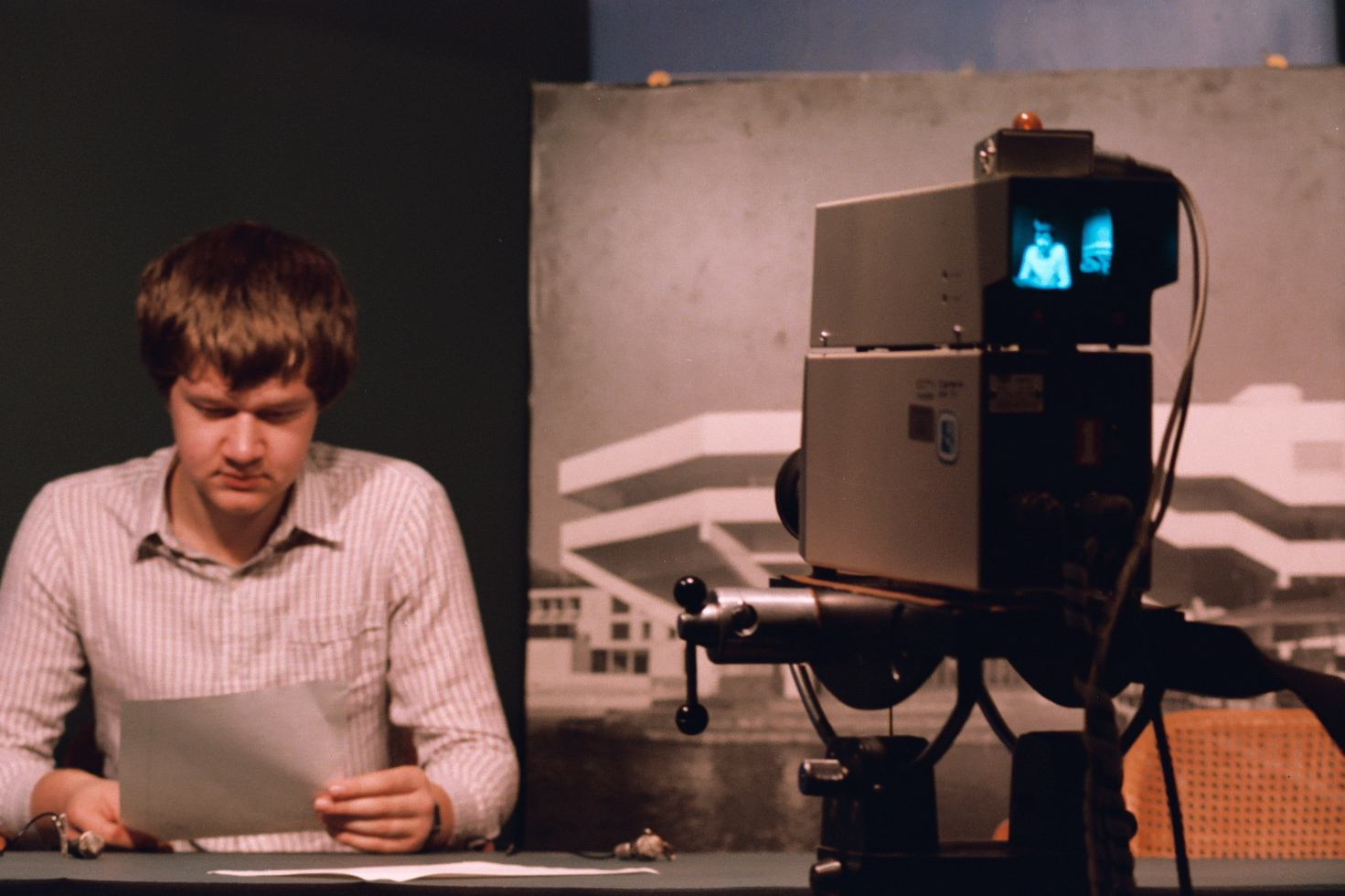
Student presenter broadcasts on YSTV, October 1985.

YSTV first broadcast on 21 November 1967 from the university's chemistry department, before moving to a permanent home in the physics department. This was actually the studio of the university's Audio-visual Department and YSTV generally borrowed it for an hour or so across lunchtimes. In 1977 the usual grant from the Students' Union of £300/year was increased to £3000 and this allowed the conversion of a Preparation Room behind the main Physics Department Lecture Hall into a small but exclusive studio for YSTV. At around the same time the society bought its first Sony Rover, which consisted of a black and white camera, smaller than the studio cameras, linked by cable to a reel-to-reel recording machine using half-inch video tape. This allowed much greater flexibility in producing programmes than before when students had been restricted to the studio. Here it remained for over two decades, until in June 1993 the university asked YSTV to vacate. Following a campaign supported by students, York University Students' Union, Greg Dyke and Tom Gutteridge, YSTV were offered a new studio on campus in Goodricke College (later becoming James College) which was officially opened by Greg Dyke on 29 October 1994.

At the start of the 2004/05 academic year on 10 October 2004, the station started to broadcast live on the campus intranet to student bedrooms, with on demand content available worldwide. On 13 January 2006, the station opened up its live stream to the whole world, releasing their content under a Creative Commons license. The station celebrated its 45th birthday in November 2012, and celebrated its 50th in November 2017.

=== Notable events ===
- October 1967 – First society stall recruiting members for University of York Tele-Film Productions.
- 21 November 1967 – inaugural YSTV broadcast from the Chemistry department.
- 1969 – Germaine Greer and Frank Muir make contributions.
- 1978 – First purpose-built studio constructed in the former Preparation Room behind the main Physics Department Lecture Hall
- 1978 – First Sony Rover system purchased for YSTV, small portable tape recording system with black & white camera, forerunner of the cam-corder.
- 1979 – First broadcast of the Student Union elections count from the main Physics Department Lecture Hall, also using the adjacent new studio. Two of the winning candidates, Fabian Hamilton and Richard Burden, go on to become Labour MP's.
- 20 October 1986 – Inaugural colour broadcast. At this time YSTV could only be watched on seven screens – one in each university college.
- January 1988 – YSTV breaks the world record for the longest continuous television broadcast by a single director (Keith Hide-Smith) and earns a place in the Guinness Book of Records with Breaker 88.
- 29 October 1994 – YSTV's G/046 Goodricke Studio opened by Greg Dyke after the threat of closure by the university.
- 1999 NASTA hosted by GUST in Glasgow – YSTV won News and Current Affairs (Bona Dicta) and Title Sequence (Bona Dicta). Highly Commended Station Ident (Naturally YSTV).
- January 2000 – YSTV produces a programme for BBC Choice titled The Making of Bulletin.
- June 2000 – YSTV appeared on Channel 4's The Big Breakfast, competing for a chance to make a 90-second programme live on air.
- 26 May 2005 – Greg Dyke returns to the studio he opened a decade previously for an in-depth interview.
- 13 January 2006 – YSTV transitions to broadcasting both live and pre-recorded content online.
- 17 November 2007 – YSTV celebrates 40 years on air with a four-hour live programme.
- October 2009 – Goodricke College is relocated to the new Heslington East campus. Although still in the same location as before, the YSTV studio is now part of James College.
- February 2011 – YSTV becomes the first station to broadcast in 3D.
- April 2011 – YSTV named second Best Broadcaster and awarded Best Technical Achievement at the National Student Television Association (NaSTA) Awards.
- April 2012 – YSTV wins Best Broadcaster at the NaSTA Awards, as well as Best Female and Highly Commended Light Entertainment.
- April 2014 – YSTV regains title of Best Broadcaster at the NaSTA Awards, as well as retaining Best Technical Achievement from 2013, and well as Highly Commended in the Factual category for 'Lights on Literature'.
- April 2015 – YSTV wins Highly Commended Technical Achievement for 'Autocue'.
- April 2016 – YSTV wins Best Documentary at the NaSTA Awards for 'Lights on Literature'
- April 2019 – YSTV wins Best Broadcaster at the NaSTA Awards, as well as Best Technical Achievement for 'Anser, Video Livestream Management System'
- December 2019 – YSTV broadcasts their first Live Interactive Drama: 'Please Sir, There's Been a Murder!'

== Gallery ==
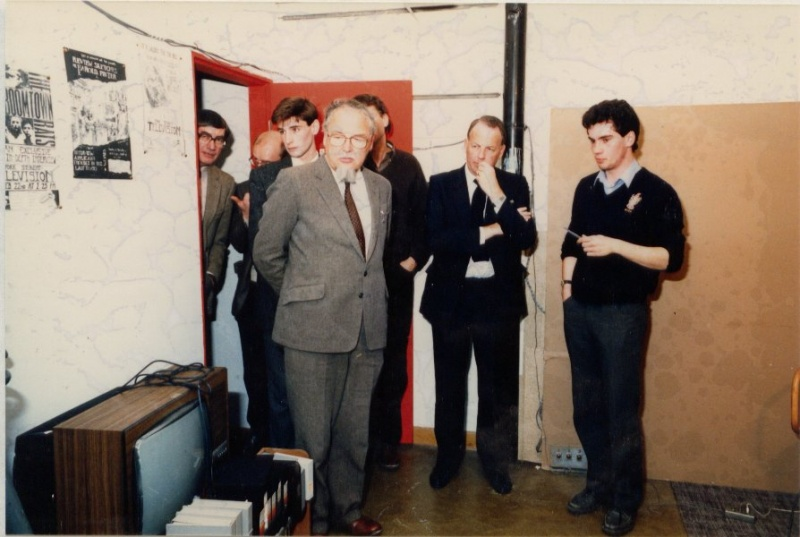
The old YSTV studio in the Physics department

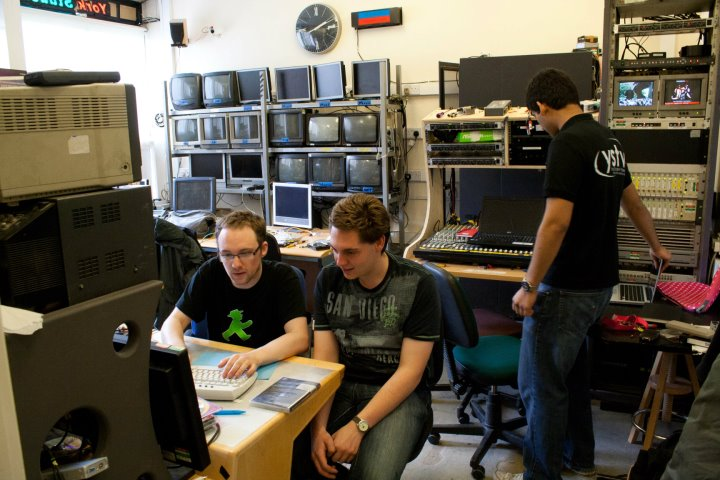
YSTV's Control Room in James College, 2011

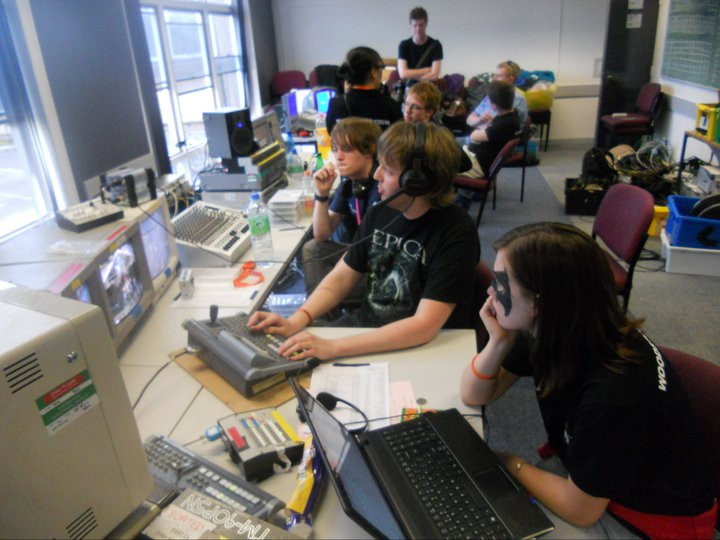
The Control Room at Woodstock 2011

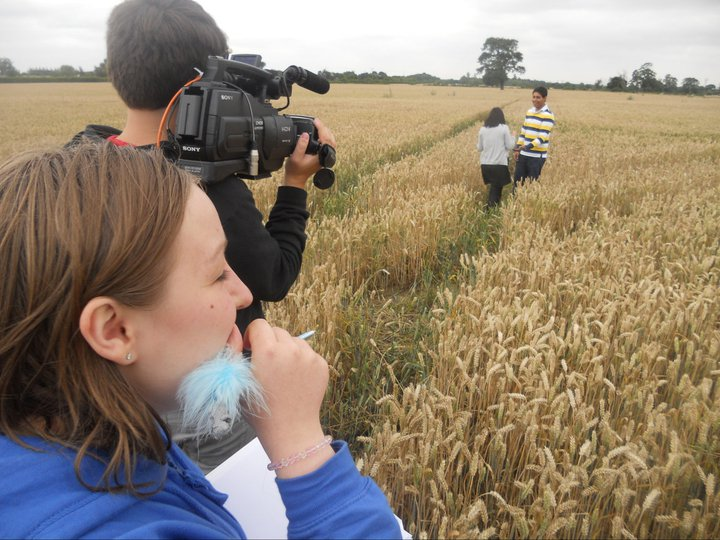
Filming Checkmate in the Yorkshire countryside, summer 2011
