= Louis Barfe =

English journalist (born 1973)

- Born: Louis Barfe; 1973 (age 52–53); Epsom, Surrey, England
- Education: Lancaster University
- Occupation: Writer

Louis Barfe (born 1973 in Epsom, Surrey) is an English writer of non-fiction. Barfe graduated in Politics from Lancaster University in 1995, where he stayed on for a 4th year as the elected editor of the university newspaper SCAN. He worked as a journalist on the book trade magazine Publishing News from 1998 to 2002, and as a freelance journalist has worked extensively for Private Eye, The Oldie and Radio Times, and has also written for the New Statesman, The Independent, The Guardian and the Sunday Telegraph. He was, until June 2005, the deputy editor of Crescendo and Jazz Music magazine. Since 2005 he has appeared extensively on BBC Radio Norfolk, mostly on the afternoon show, with Graham Barnard, Chris Goreham, Roy Waller and Stephen Bumfrey, talking about archive television, and has contributed to programmes on BBC Radio 2, BBC Radio 3, BBC Radio 4 and BBC Radio 5 Live.

His first book, Where Have All the Good Times Gone? The rise and fall of the record industry, was published in 2004 by Atlantic Books. Atlantic also published his second, Turned Out Nice Again: the story of British light entertainment, which came out in 2008; and his biography of the comedian Les Dawson, The Trials and Triumphs of Les Dawson, which was published in 2012.

He ran in the 2010 United Kingdom general election as an independent candidate in Waveney.

When he was asked to write a biography of Morecambe and Wise, his initial thought was: surely there's nothing new to be said about the comedy duo. But he was able to find a fresh perspective on well-worn events when he began interviewing key figures from the lives of the comedians.
