= Student television in the United Kingdom =

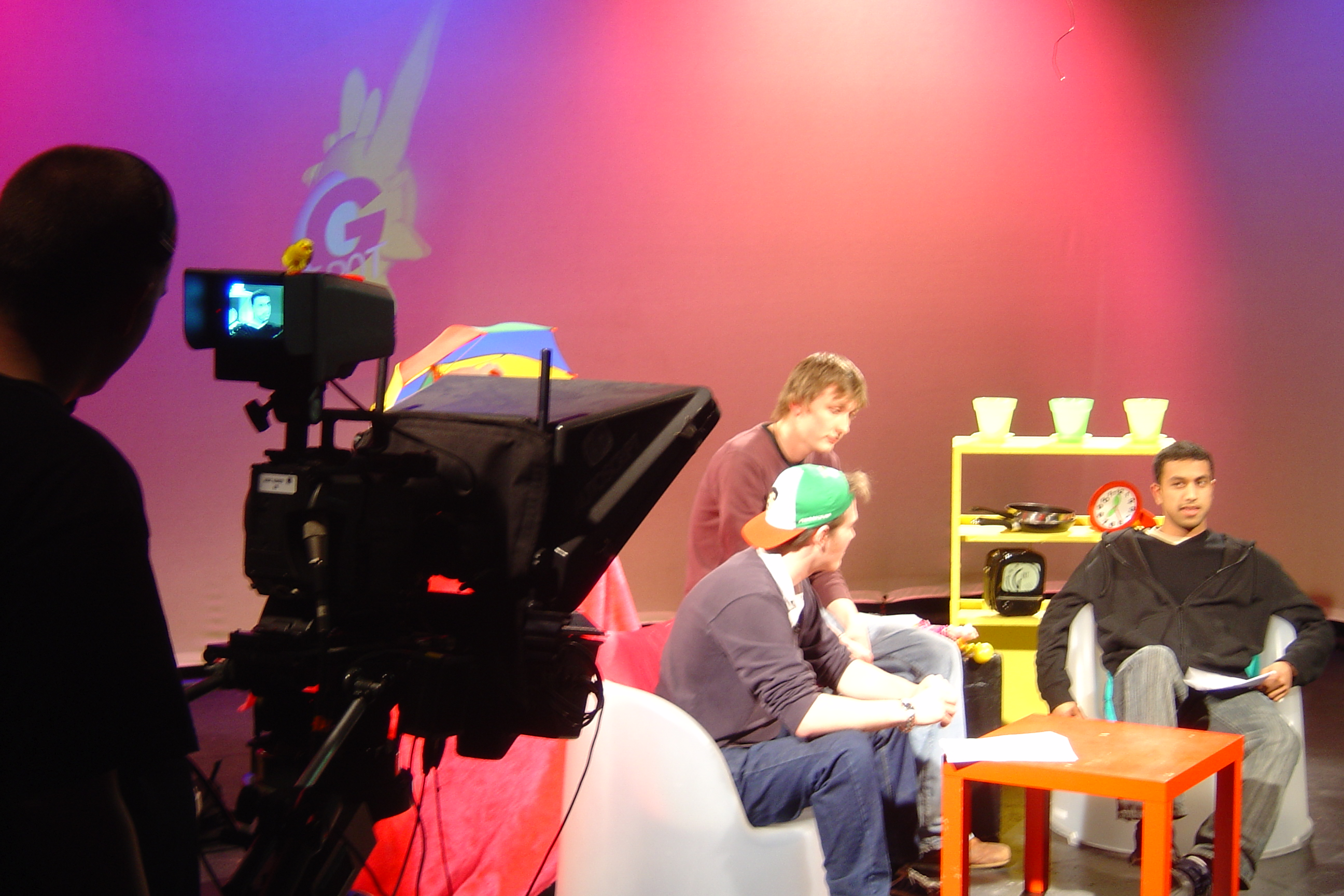
A programme being filmed by the University of Glasgow's student television station, GUST

Student television in the United Kingdom is the act of students from universities and colleges around the United Kingdom producing and publishing video content independently, operating in a similar fashion to a small television station. Student television stations exist all around the United Kingdom.

Content is not generally output across traditional media, as a broadcast licence may be prohibitively expensive to small non-profit organisations. Most student television stations use the Internet as a primary method of distributing content; either on a dedicated website, via their university's pages or on video sharing sites such as YouTube. Student television encapsulates a variety of different programming styles and techniques: from large stations funded by their universities who broadcast into student accommodation and buildings, to a single student uploading occasional shows to the web.

Some student stations are affiliated with The National Student Television Association (abbreviated NaSTA), which has forty member stations. The association holds an awards ceremony once a year to reward the best work submitted by the member stations across a number of categories.

== History ==
Some student television stations in the United Kingdom pre-date the founding of national broadcasters like Channel 4 (1982) and Five (1997). Glasgow University Student Television was the first student television station to be founded in the United Kingdom, in 1964. It is the oldest student television station in Europe. Although technically, a station was founded in the United States that predates GUST, this station was staff run for students. This means that GUST is the oldest student-run student television station in the world. York Student Television followed in 1967, and was the first station to be started in England. STOIC started in London in October 1969 and began producing regular programmes on 17 February 1970.

Prior to the advent of digital video technology, particularly editing software, a student television station was costly to run and the programmes were difficult to edit. As digital technology became more available and its cost reduced, it became possible for student societies to move to digital video production.

== Cultural impact ==
Student produced television is becoming increasingly recognised in the United Kingdom, with the National Union of Students having awards for both "Best Media Student" and "Student Broadcaster of the Year", as well as the Royal Television Society's awards for student television stations and student produced content. The Guardian hosts its Student Media Awards annually, offering a "Broadcast Journalist of the year" award.

YSTV from its foundation in 1967 had a twice-weekly news show aimed at students, named Newsround, that pre-dated the BBC show of the same name In 2006, An animation called Badgered by Sharon Colman who was a student at the National Film and Television School was nominated for an Academy Award for Best Animated Short Film.

In 2011 the short film "The Confession" by Tanel Toom, who was a student at the National Film and television School, was nominated for an Academy Award for Best Short Film.

== The National Student Television Association ==
The National Student Television Association (NaSTA) was believed to be formed in 1970, and comprises over forty affiliated stations from all over the United Kingdom. In late 2016, it was discovered that the Association was formed in 1968. It runs an annual awards ceremony in which eligible stations submit examples of their programming for appraisal by judges drawn from the wider broadcast industry.

The earliest evidence of a NaSTA awards ceremony is the late 1970s. GUST still have the trophy that was awarded to the winners and have a video archive with interviews following the win. YSTV possess a "freestyle award" trophy from 1989. The earliest documented record of a NaSTA conference however dates from the 1995 conference, with eight member stations in attendance. Each year one of the affiliated stations volunteers to be the host station of NaSTA, hosting the awards ceremony and administrating the organisation - this includes the managing of finances, communications and promotion for the entire organisation.

Students involved with NaSTA automatically become part of STAN - the Student Television Alumni Network (STAN) following their graduation. STAN is run by a committee of alumni, and hold events throughout the year for both former and current students.

In October 2008, NaSTA launched Freshers TV, a collaboration of over 20 student stations across the United Kingdom providing a television channel to cover freshers' week at universities across the country. This was made available on Freewire, SUBtv and online via the Freshers TV website with the assistance of the JANET network.

The first live FreshersTV show was broadcast in October 2010 by hosts, LSTV, and another in October 2011 by new hosts SUSUtv. 2012 Host: YSTV, 2013 Host: LA1:TV from Lancaster. 2014 Host: Demon TV (DeMontfort University 2015 Host: Forge TV (University of Sheffield) 2016 Host: CUTV (Cardiff Union TV) 2017 Host:Guild TV (University of Birmingham) 2018 Host: Forge TV (University of Sheffield)

2013 saw the addition of the People's Choice Awards to the annual events. The awards differed from the previous awards in that they were voted for entirely by the audience through online voting. 2013 Host: SUSUTV (University of Southampton 2014 Host: SXTV (University of Essex) 2015 Host: XTV (University of Exeter) 2016 Host: Rhubarb TV (University of Royal Holloway)

2020's award show was hosted entire online and livestreamed from Salford.

NaSTA's 2000-2024
Year	Host	Best Broadcaster
2025	Sonar Events	YSTV
2024	Fuse TV, Quays TV, Shock TV	PalTV
2023	Creative Capital	PalTV
2022	YSTV	PalTV
2021	Quays TV	LSTV
2020	Quays TV	NSTV
2019	NSTV	YSTV
2018	ForgeTV	LSTV
2017	GuildTV	UBTV
2016	LSTV	UBTV
2015	LA1:TV & PulseTV	DUSA TV
2014	LSUTV	YSTV
2013	XTV	NSTV
2012	NUTS (NSTV)	YSTV
2011	LSUTV	LSTV
2010	GUST	
2009	SUSUtv	LSTV
2008	LUST	BTV
2007	WTV and GTV	LUST
2006	LSTV and YSTV	LSTV
2005	LSUTV	Nerve TV
2004	Nexus UTV	XTV
2003	GUST	
2002	YSTV	
2001	STOIC & BTV	GUST
2000	C6	LSTV
