= Deramore =

Deramore may refer to:

- Baron Deramore, of Belvoir in the County of Down, a title in the Peerage of the United Kingdom
- Deramore Arms, Heslington, a suburban village and civil parish within the City of York, in North Yorkshire, England
- Deramore High School or Balmoral High School, secondary school in Belfast, Northern Ireland
- Richard de Yarburgh-Bateson, 6th Baron Deramore (1911–2006), British architect, writer of erotic fiction, and a peer of the United Kingdom
- Thomas Bateson, 1st Baron Deramore (1819–1890), British peer and Conservative Party politician

== See also ==
- Dehram
- Derham (disambiguation)
- Derrymore (disambiguation)
