= Vice-Chancellor's House =

University building

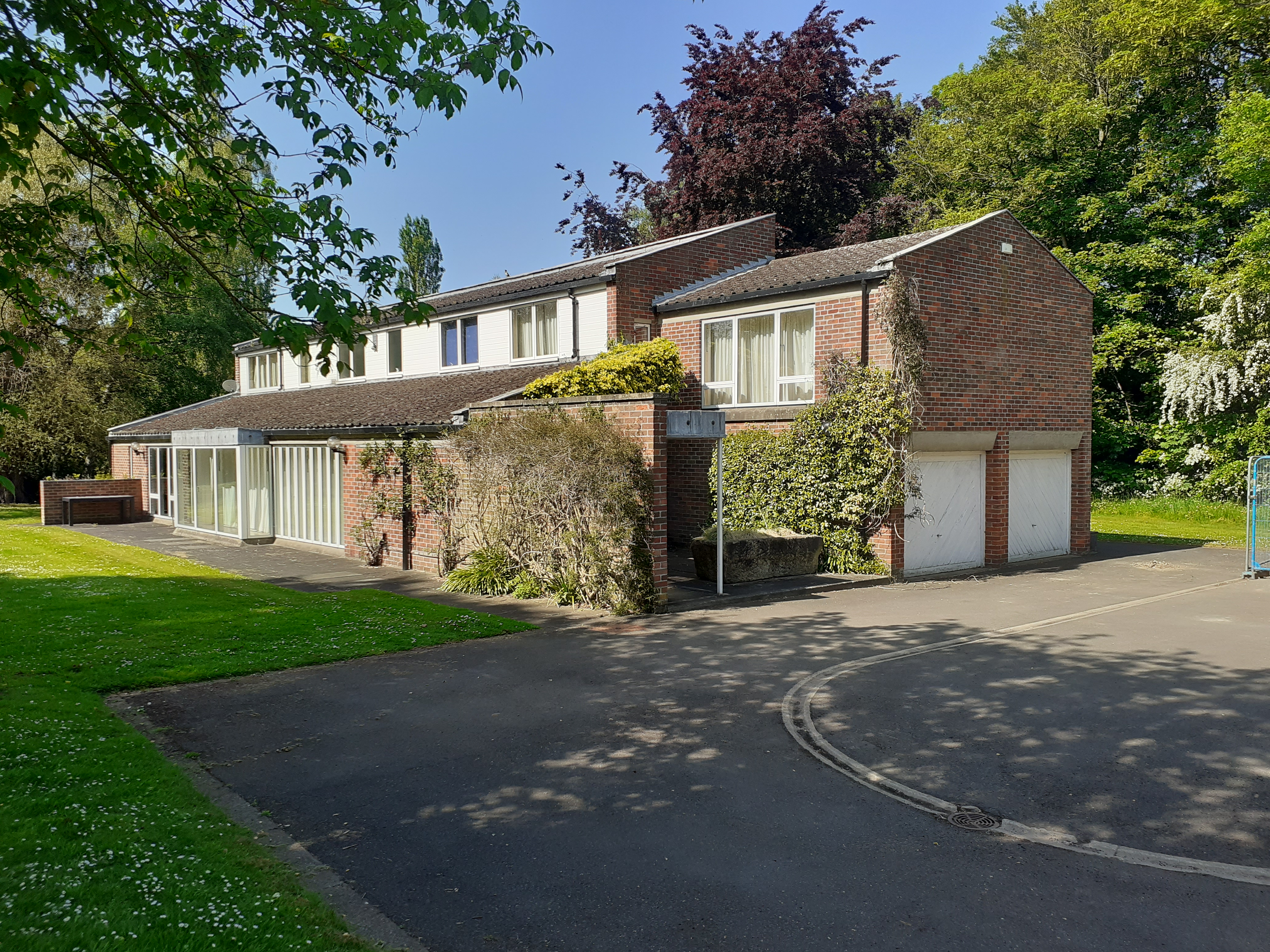
- The house
- Interactive map of the Vice-Chancellor's House area

General information
- Location: Vice Chancellors House, Spring Lane Heslington, York, North Yorkshire, YO10 5DZ
- Coordinates: 53.946118°N 1.051265°W
- Current tenants: Vacant
- Completed: 1964
- Owner: University of York

Design and construction
- Architects: Alan Balfour and Colin Beck
- Architecture firm: Robert Matthew Johnson-Marshall and Partners

The Vice-Chancellor's House is a house on Spring Lane in Heslington, York. It was originally built as on-site accommodation for the vice-chancellor of the University of York in 1964, close to the vice-chancellor's office in Heslington Hall.

== History ==
The house was built for the university's first vice-chancellor, Baron James of Rusholme, the primary architect of the university, and his wife, Lady Cordelia James. Under the guidance of Lady James, the original internal furnishings were a careful mix of modern and traditional. A key feature of the house was the ability to host events and entertain guests to the university. In May 1965, Jeremy Thorpe, the then leader of the Liberal Party, had a meeting with Lord James there, examining whether he would be suitable as a Liberal Whip in the House of Lords.

In 2008, Tom Scott was elected president of the University of York Student Union under the persona of 'Mad Capt'n Tom'. One of his manifesto promises was to have a loaded cannon aimed at the Vice-Chancellor's House. In 2010, concerns over the expenses of the then vice-chancellor, Brian Cantor, were raised. In all cases, the journey started or ended at the Vice-Chancellors House or Heslington Hall. Successive vice-chancellors have lived in the house, but the current vice-chancellor, Charlie Jeffrey, chose not to. Instead, the house has been used by the university as student accommodation, as well as storage. In January 2023, the house was the Twentieth Century Society's 'Building of the month. The idea of using the house as a permanent art gallery, as opposed to the Norman Rea Gallery which only hosts temporary exhibits, has been muted, but so far no steps have been taken. The Tab highlighted how well maintained the garden is despite the lack of occupants.

== Style ==
The early buildings at the university were constructed with the CLASP system, giving them a distinct brutalist appearance. In contrast, the Vice-Chancellor's House, while still contemporary, used bricks and a more traditional appearance to fit into its surroundings. While the simple appearance of the student accommodation reflected their purpose of occupation by students for short periods, the traditional and more obviously domestic nature of the Vice-Channcellor's House reflected his commitment to the university and significant role in its everyday life. However, this was not to everyone's taste, with Jeremy Thorpe describing it as "the back end of a crematorium".
