= Long Boi =

Tall Indian Runner duck

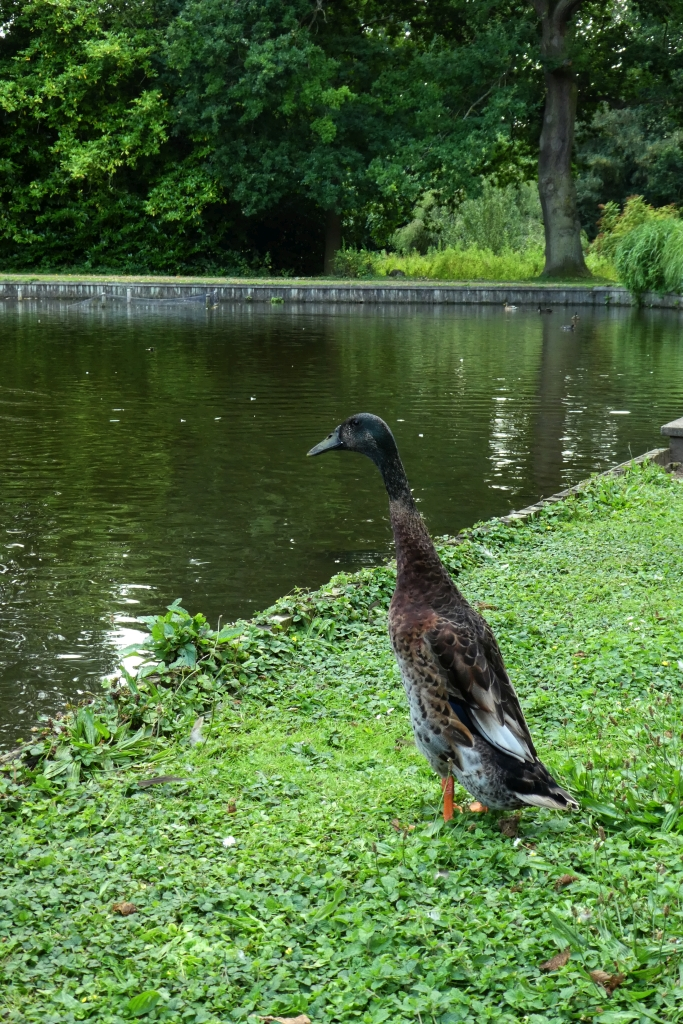
- Long Boi by Heslington Fish Pond in 2021
- Other name: Longboi
- Species: Domestic duck (Anas platyrhynchos domesticus)
- Breed: Indian Runner duck–Mallard cross
- Sex: Male
- Hatched: before 2018
- Died: c. April 2023; York, United Kingdom
- Known for: Tallness, memes, popular culture, media appearances
- Residence: Derwent College, University of York
- Height: around 70 cm (2 ft 4 in)
- https://www.york.ac.uk/about/history/long-boi/

Long Boi (before 2018 – April 2023) was an unusually tall male duck that lived by Derwent College, University of York, England. He was thought to be an Indian Runner duck-Mallard cross, standing out among the other ducks on the campus due to his height. He went viral and became an internet meme in 2021. His popularity saw him become an unofficial mascot for the university. At least one commentator has branded him 'Britain's most famous duck'.

In May 2023, Long Boi was presumed dead, having not been seen on campus for several weeks. A memorial service for Long Boi was held on 26 September 2024, which was presided over by Greg James and broadcast live on BBC Radio 1, and culminated with the unveiling of a bronze statue of Long Boi.

== Biography ==
Little is known about Long Boi's origins, although it is believed that he was left on the University of York campus as an unwanted pet. Students fed him to help him to settle into his new home, noting that he didn't seem to fit in with the other ducks at first.

Long Boi spent most of his time on and around Heslington Fish Pond next to Derwent College, where he eventually integrated with the other campus waterfowl. His friends included a smaller male Indian runner duck called Chonky Boi, some female mallards, and a male mandarin duck called Fancy Boi.

== Rise to popularity ==
Long Boi has become a University of York campus celebrity and informal mascot, often mentioned in welcome talks and graduation ceremonies. Long Boi fluffy toys have been presented to the university's graduates.

Long Boi became an internet sensation in 2021 following a Reddit post that incorrectly described him as the tallest mallard ever, at over 1m tall (in fact he was around 70cm tall, and not a true mallard duck).

Long Boi was subsequently mentioned by James Corden on his US late-night talk show The Late Late Show in April 2021, who showed an edited image of Long Boi dressed in a trench coat and quipped, "Put a trench coat on that duck and he looks like two ducks trying to get into an R-rated movie". Followers of Long Boi's Instagram account, run by University of York biology student Zoe Duffin, increased to 16,300 people in less than 24 hours. Footballer Peter Crouch, who is 6 ft 7 in (2.01 m), shared his appreciation of Long Boi, tweeting "That's my kind of duck!".

In 2022 Long Boi was mentioned by Greg James on BBC Radio 1 who hoped to do a show with Long Boi. After some planning and with help from the university's social media team and the University of York Students' Union, this was able to happen in March 2023 where he was able to 'quack' on the show.

Long Boi has been the subject of April Fools jokes by The Tab, claiming that the university planned to feature Long Boi on its new logo and that Vice-Chancellor Charlie Jeffery had awarded him an Honorary Doctorate, calling him the "perfect ambassador" for the university. At the university he inspired the Long Boi Society, a student society centred on an interest in waterfowl and on Long Boi himself.

In April 2023, third-year Environment, Economics and Ecology student Tom Howes received a tattoo of Long Boi while on a university volleyball tour in Portugal. The tattoo made national news and added to Long Boi's virality.

== Disappearance ==
In early May 2023, students and staff at the university raised concerns that Long Boi seemed to have gone missing from campus; The Tab reported that he had not been sighted since 22 April, whilst a post on Long Boi's Instagram page claimed the last known sighting was "sometime around mid-March." A spokesperson for the university told the York Vision: "Long Boi is a much-loved character on campus and whilst we haven't seen him around over the past few weeks, we continue to keep a lookout for him and hope to see him again, safe and well, soon."

Considering Long Boi's popularity and importance to the university, the Ground and Estates team reportedly searched the campus while also reminding students that, as a wild animal, he may simply have left the university grounds. The main speculation was that Long Boi was a victim of a recent fox attack, while rumours spread that he had died but the university's student union had postponed reporting his death due to York's defeat in the 2023 Roses Tournament. A duck expert also highlighted that, considering the time of year, it was possible that Long Boi had temporarily left the grounds of the university in order to find a mate. A 3 May 2023 post from Long Boi's Instagram account said that there is "a strong possibility that Long Boi may have passed away."

The Daily Telegraph reported that there were calls among students for a statue of Long Boi to be erected in light of his disappearance. This was not the first time that this idea had been suggested, with a suggestion on YUSUggestions from 2022 campaigning for this. Two consecutive YUSU presidents supported the idea in principle but raised concerns over how financially viable the idea was and proposed a crowdfunding campaign.

On 11 May 2023, the University of York concluded that Long Boi had died. He had not been seen on campus for nearly two months.

In May 2024 a post on a university confessions page claimed that Long Boi had been killed by a member of the Lancaster University men's hockey team who were at York for the 2023 Roses Tournament. Members of the team were quick to debunk it, while other students questioned how realistic it was, notably the claim that the confessor found loose bricks around the campus. This seemed unlikely, given the absence of bricks around Derwent Common.

== Legacy ==
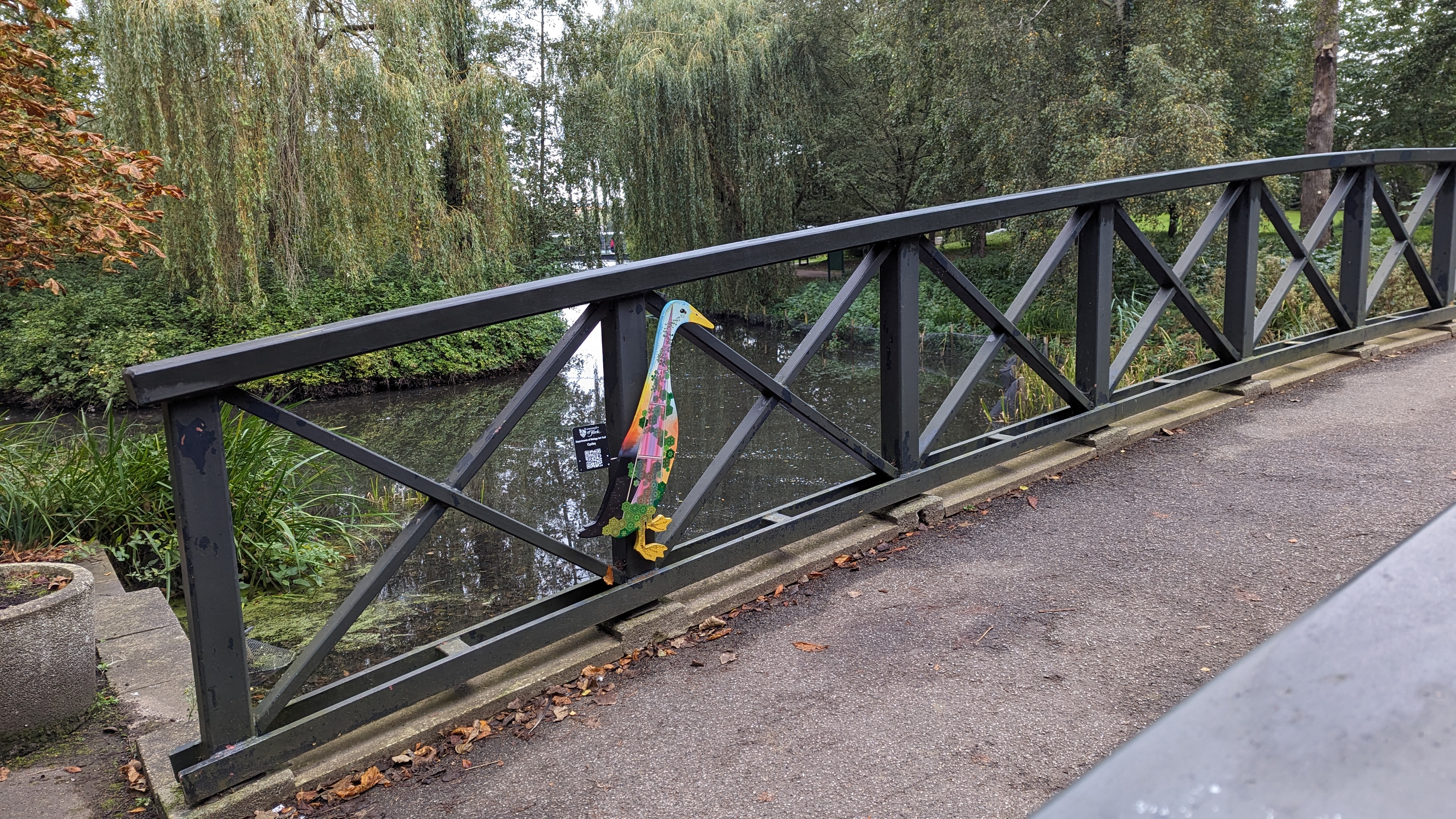
Long Boiology Art Trail

In August 2023 the Long Boi Society was put up for adoption, meaning that it had been unable to have a full committee when reratifying with YUSU.

In September 2023, the Department of Biology launched its "Long Boiology [sic] Art Trail", celebrating art, science and education in the Biosciences at York through the medium of Indian Runner duck silhouettes decorated by staff and students attached to various locations on West Campus.

Jeremy Corbyn expressed his condolences to the student community, stating “If an appropriate memorial appears I will wish to visit it…I would happily take a selfie with him.”

The official merchandise for the 2024 BBC Radio 1's Big Weekend featured Long Boi.

In autumn 2024, in tribute to Long Boi, the ghost "Long Duck" was added to the York Museum Gardens as part of the York BID "Ghosts in the Gardens" project.

=== Statue ===
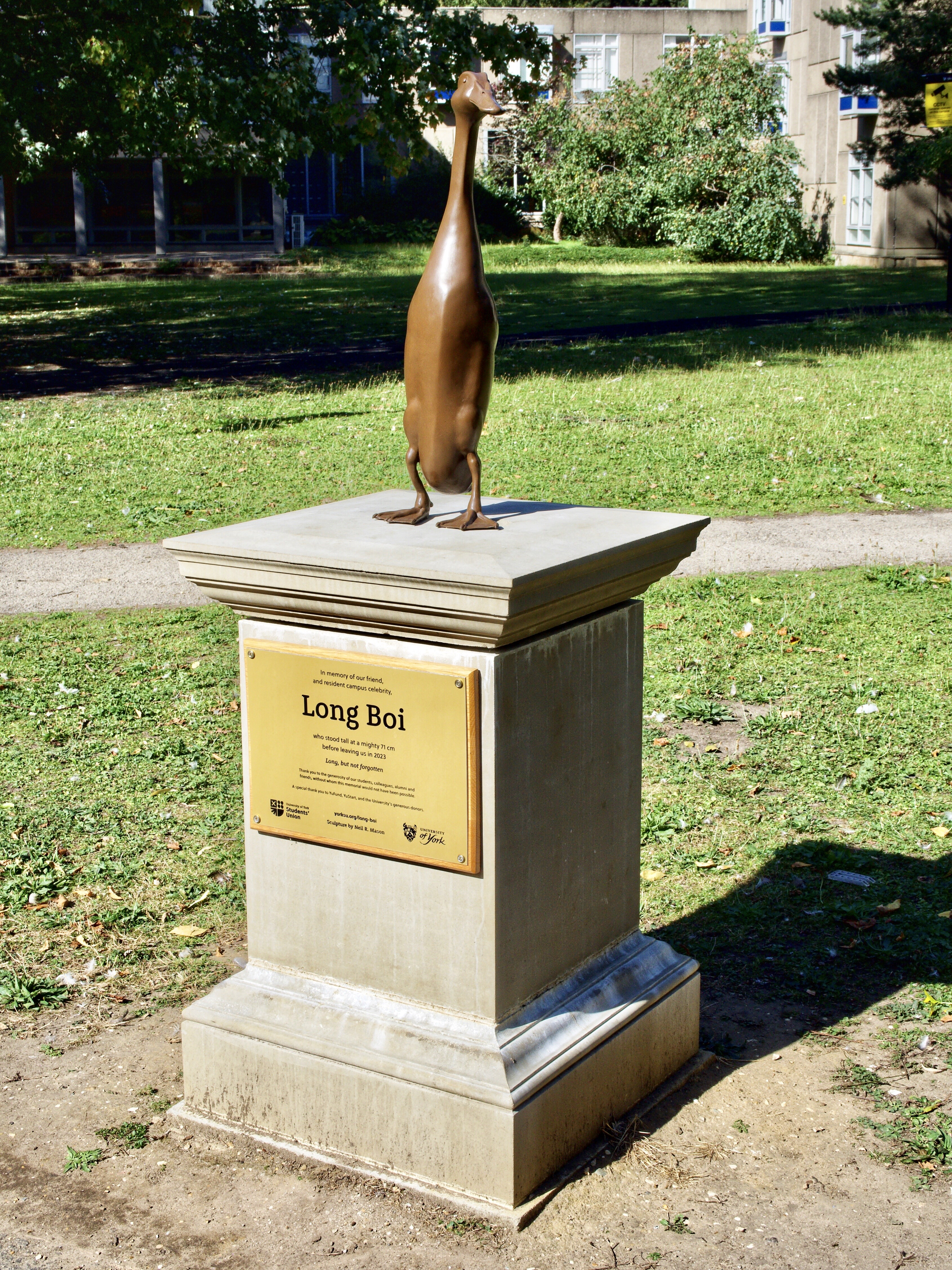
The Long Boi statue in 2025

The University of York reported on 11 May 2023 that YUSU was working on plans to organise a fitting tribute to Long Boi. On 15 May the YUSU president, Pierrick Roger, announced plans to erect a to-scale memorial to Long Boi. If £1,000–£2,000 was raised, a bench with a plaque to Long Boi would be constructed. If more than £2,000 was raised, a statue would be installed. Any excess donations would be donated to a "Travel Abroad Award" as a York Futures Scholarship named after Long Boi.

The £1,000 target was surpassed within a day, and the £2,000 target was reached by 17 May 2023. Ultimately, £5,500 was raised, and the plan was to for the statue to be made of bronze (although ceramic and silver were suggested), and placed on Derwent Common.

In December 2023, the wildlife sculptor Neil R. Mason was chosen as the artist to complete the sculpture.

With an absence of updates, and considering the context of the serious financial situation students were in when the money was raised, some students raised concerns that the funds were not being used to build the statue as promised, and even that Pierrick Roger had absconded with them. The design for the sculpture was revealed in May 2024, with the clay moulds being sent to Greece to be cast in bronze.

On 26 September 2024, the finished statue was revealed in a ceremony led by Greg James and broadcast on BBC Radio 1. The ceremony, held in the university's Central Hall and supported by York SU Technical Theatre Society (TechSoc), was attended by hundreds of people and included short remarks by Vice Chancellor Charlie Jeffery, a minute of quacking, and musical performances of Wiz Khalifa's "See You Again" by organist Anna Lapwood and Chappell Roan's "Hot to Go!" by the university's Sing Song Society.

In November 2024, the statue was removed by the university after significant damage to its right leg. In late August 2025 it was returned to its original location.

== See also ==
- Longcat
