= Charles XII (disambiguation) =

Charles XII usually refers to Charles XII of Sweden, King of Sweden from 1697 to 1718.

Charles XII may also refer to:

- Charles XII (film) (1925), about the king
- Charles the Twelfth, British racehorse (19th century)
- The Charles XII, York, England, a pub
