= Derham =

Derham may refer to:

People with the surname:

- Brigid Derham (1943–1980), British artist
- Sir David Derham (1920–1985), Australian jurist and university administrator
- Enid Derham (1882–1941), Australian poet and academic
- Frederick Derham (1844–1922), Australian politician
- James Derham (c.1757–1802?), the first African-American to formally practice medicine in the United States
- James M. Derham, American diplomat
- Katie Derham (born 1970), English newscaster and presenter
- Michael Derham (1889–1923), Irish politician
- Patrick Derham OBE (born 1959), Headmaster of Westminster School
- Rkia Derham (born 1978), Moroccan politician
- Sir Peter Derham (1925–2008), Australian business executive and philanthropist
- Samuel Derham (1655–1689), English physician
- Thomas Derham (died 1444/5), English politician
- William Derham (1657–1735), English clergyman and natural philosopher
- Zoe Derham (born 1980), English hammer thrower

Company:

- Derham Body Company, American coachbuilder

== See also ==
- Dereham (disambiguation)
- Durham (disambiguation)
- DeRham Farm in Philipstown, New York
- Dyrham, village in Gloucestershire, England
