= Little Hall, Heslington =

Building in Heslington, North Yorkshire, England

Coordinates: 53°56′40″N 1°02′43″W

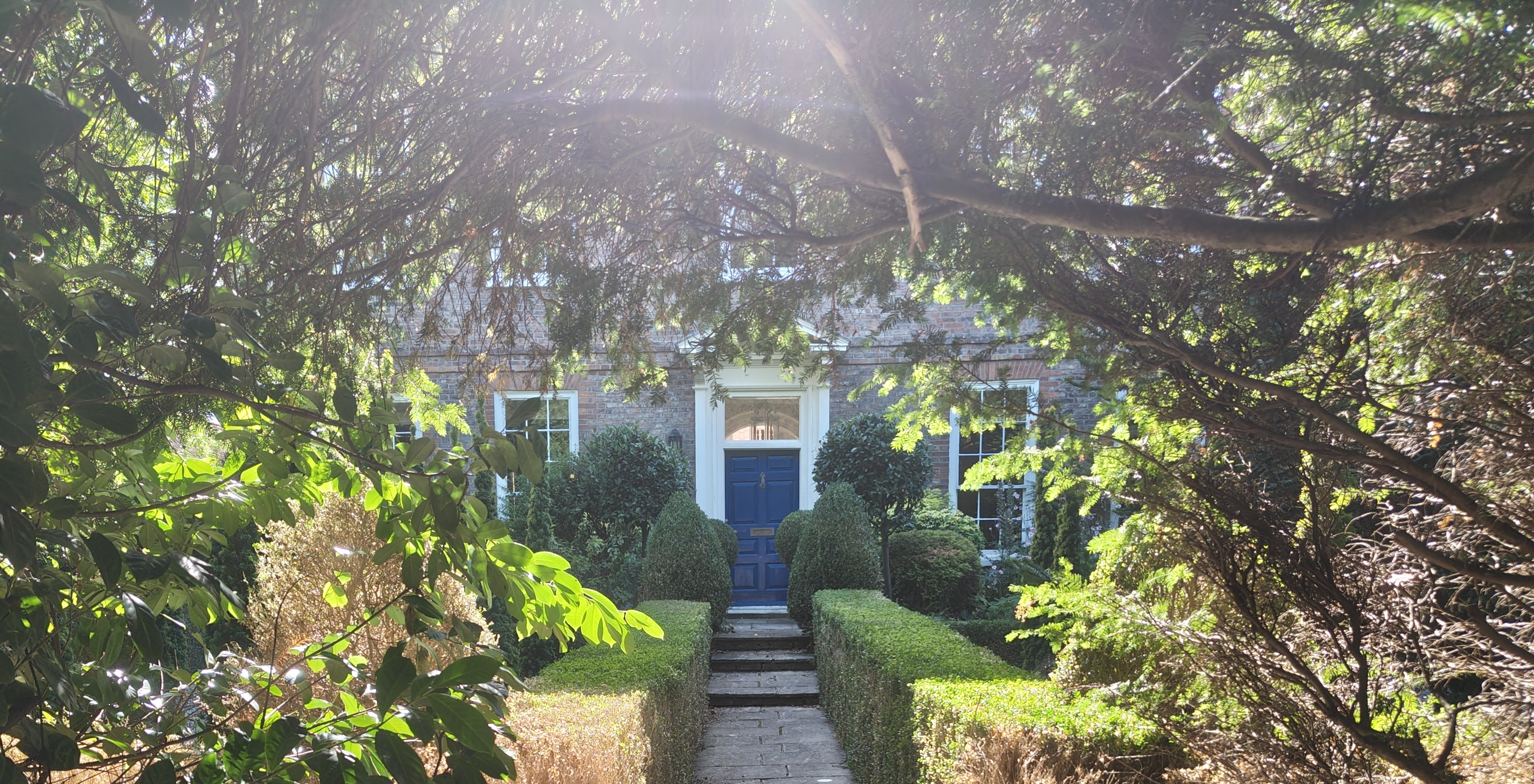
The building, in 2025

Little Hall is a historic building in Heslington, a village in the City of York, in England.

The house was built in 1734 for John Yarburgh, probably as a dower house to Heslington Hall. In the second half of the 19th century it became a farmhouse, the house was extended to the rear to provide a kitchen, and a greenhouse was added at the side. In the 1940s, the farm was sold off, then in about 1985 the kitchen was extended and a further rear extension was added to house a reception room. The building was grade II* listed in 1966. Nikolaus Pevsner describes the house as "ambitious" and its main staircase as "charming".

The two-storey house is built of brick, with a tiled roof. It is five bays wide, with a central doorway with pilasters either side, a 20th-century window above, and a broken pediment atop that. The sash windows each have 15 panes of glass. There is an eaves band and a parapet, chimney stacks at each end, and scalloped gables. Inside, the sitting room and dining room have panelling and 18th-century fireplaces. The dining room also has alcoves with shaped shelves. Both the main and service staircases are early, and the staircase hall ceiling has moulded plasterwork panels. There is further panelling upstairs, and most of the windows have shutters.

The former coach house is grade II listed, and is a two-storey, two-bay building. It is contemporary with the house. It is built of brick with stone coping and a pantile roof. It has arched carriage entrances, blocked ocular windows on the first floor, an external flight of stone steps, and diamond-shaped pigeon holes in the gables.

== See also ==
- Grade II* listed buildings in the City of York
