= Derwent College, York =

College of the University of York, England

Coordinates: 53.94684°N 1.04792°W

Derwent College
- University of York
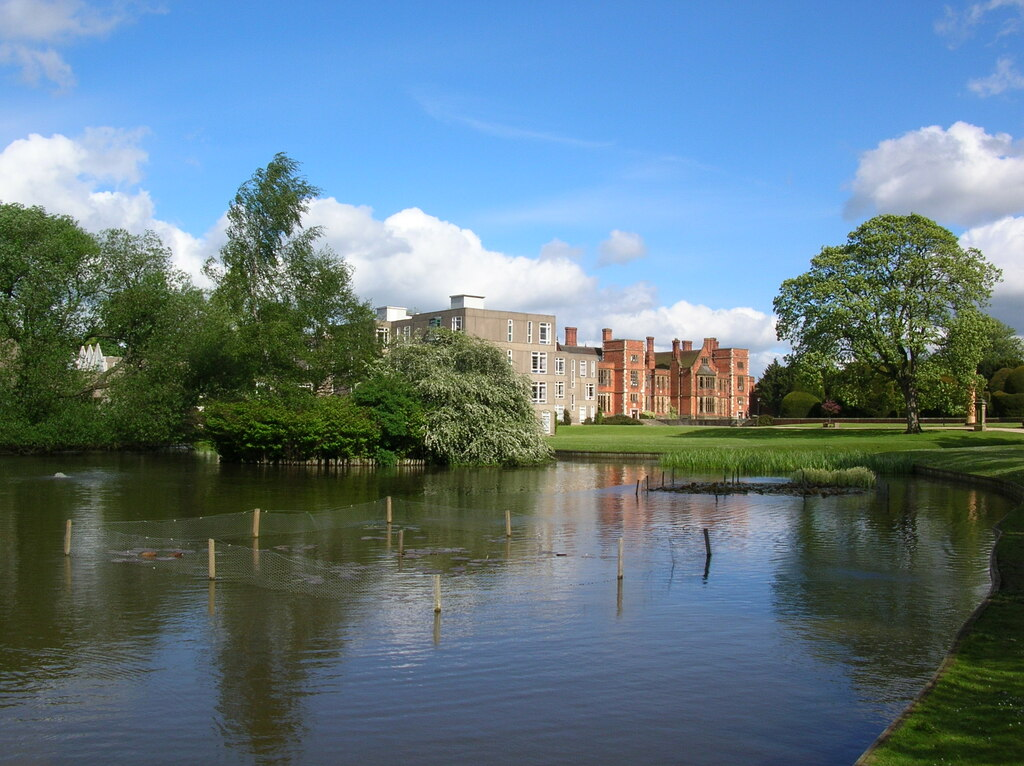
- View across Heslington Fish-pond towards Derwent College and Heslington Hall
- Location: Heslington West, York
- Motto: Latin: Virtus et Animus
- Established: 1965
- Named after: River Derwent
- College Manager: Andrew Kerrigan
- Principal: Eleanor Brown
- Deputy College Manager: Helen Fairburn
- Undergraduates: 1,440 (2022/2023)
- Postgraduates: 140 (2022/2023)
- Mascot: Derwent Duck
- Newspaper: The Derwenter
- Website: Derwent College

Listed Building – Grade II
- Official name: Derwent College, University of York
- Designated: 22 August 2018
- Reference no.: 1457040

Listed Building – Grade II
- Official name: Former Langwith College, University of York
- Designated: 22 August 2018
- Reference no.: 1457043

Derwent College is a college of the University of York, and alongside Langwith College was one of the first two colleges to be opened following the university's inception. It is named after the local River Derwent. Both the original college building and the former Langwith college buildings are Grade II listed, making all of the current Derwent College premises Grade II listed.

The college itself is next to Heslington Hall, and close to the gazebo and gardens known collectively as The Quiet Place.

== History ==
Derwent, alongside Langwith College is one of the founding colleges at the University of York. It was officially opened by Queen Elizabeth II on 22 October 1965.

Following Langwith's move to the Heslington East campus in 2012, its former buildings are now part of Derwent College.

== Buildings and services ==
Derwent College has twelve accommodation blocks, named A, B, C, D, E, F, G, H, J, K, M and P. Blocks A, B, C, D, J, K, M and P are standard university accommodation; they were built in the CLASP system, consisting of prefabricated concrete blocks and panels. The decision to use the system on this unprecedented scale was an innovation by Sir Andrew Derbyshire, the project architect behind the original university.

Block A is part of the main college nucleus, being the north-west and north-east sides of a small quadrangle, with the administrative offices and JCR on the south-east. B Block is situated nearer Heslington Hall overlooking the University Lake. C and D Blocks are also located near Heslington Hall and also form a single separate building in most important respects.

The original college only had A, B, and C blocks. Block D was added a few years later on a different floor plan with comparatively small individual rooms, but a large central kitchen and eating area. The older blocks had little communal space but somewhat larger rooms. Derwent College inherited the "Old Langwith" Blocks in 2012, when a new Langwith College was built on the Heslington East campus; blocks J, K, M and P are now part of the enlarged college.

There were also a small group of rooms known as "N Block" (N standing for nucleus) which were situated above the main kitchen. Originally these were used for guest accommodation, however they have since been converted to offices.

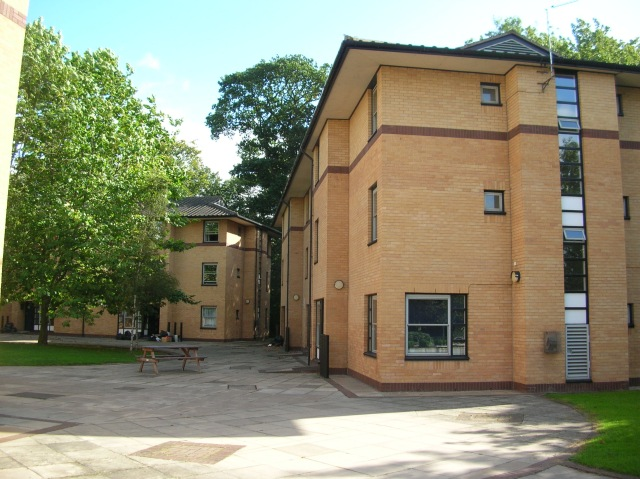
Derwent's F and G Blocks

E, F, G and H Blocks are situated across the other side of University Road from the rest of the college, adjacent to Heslington Church field. They are more recently brick-build accommodation and some of these rooms offer en-suite bathroom facilities. Originally only two of these blocks belonged to Derwent, the other two were part of Langwith, prior to that college's move to the new East Campus, and collectively they were often referred to as "Derwith," and more contemporaneously as "Extension."

Further to the main blocks, Derwent students are also accommodated in Eden's Court which is situated on Heslington Lane. Eden's Court comprises eight houses, each of nine or ten rooms with similar layout to those of Halifax College. There are also two cottages, Eden's Cottage and Sycamore Cottage. Eden's Court is jocularly referred to by the other blocks of Derwent as 'Shutter Island', due to its isolation in being situated nearer to Halifax College than the Derwent nucleus. Eden's Court was not always affiliated to Derwent and its residents, mostly mature students, belonged to a range of colleges.

Facilities in Derwent include Computer Services classrooms and computer rooms, and the Derwent bar and dining room. During the day there is a main dining room, a snack bar and a drinks bar.

Derwent College is home to the university's Politics, Education, English and Related Literature, and School of PPE departments.

Derwent College came to have a close association with Long Boi, an Indian Runner duck-Mallard cross who was most often seen Heslington Fishpond and wandering around Derwent Common. He was an unofficial mascot to the college. His silhouette was for a time included on college merchandise.

The college is also the site of the Norman Rea Gallery, the only student-run art gallery in the country.

== Administration ==
The College Principal is a university academic who shares teaching duties with college responsibilities. The College Principal works with the College Manager, the College Administrator and the College Life Team. The current College Principal is Eleanor Brown.

List of College Provosts/Heads of College/College Principals:

- Harry Rée (1965-1974)
- Michael Green (1974-1980)
- Ron Weir (1980-2009)
- Rob Aitken (2009-2014)
- Eleanor Brown (2014-present)

== Student life ==
=== Student representation ===
All undergraduate students of Derwent College are members of the Junior Common room, and continue to remain members throughout their time at the university. The Junior Common Room Committee is responsible for representing the interests of Derwent students, organising events, and promoting student well-being. The committee is elected annually from the undergraduate population, and consists of around 40 members.

All postgraduate students of Derwent College are members of the Graduate Common room, and continue to remain members throughout their time at the university. The Graduate Common Room Committee is responsible for representing the interests of Derwent students, organising events, and welfare provision. The committee is elected annually from the postgraduate population.

=== Events ===
Derwent College prides itself on having the unofficial motto of 'the social college.' This tradition is upheld annually by members of the JCRC, who put on the vast majority of events within the college.

Club D, a student club night on campus is organised through the Junior Common room. This is held periodically during term time in D-Bar and Derwent's dining room. Typically, there are four of these per academic year, with Cabaret D in Freshers Week, Halloween D in October, Back 2 School D in Refreshers Week and a summer D, known as Big D (formerly Derwent BBQ). Big D is an end of year event along the lines of Club D, but on a larger scale. Taking up the whole area in and around the college, it is normally held on the first Monday after exams and has several rooms of music, bars and food, and open air activities. Notable acts include Scouting for Girls and Macky Gee. The college is also one of the locations of the Tommy Tour by The Who.

Outside of D events, the JCRC also put on many smaller events in D Bar. These include an annual 'Take Me Out' in February, a Burns Night and St Andrews Day Ceilidh open to both the JCR and SCR, a Winter Formal (usually in a local hotel or the Railway Museum) and a 'Summer Soiree,' which involves canapes on the lawns of Heslington Hall followed by the annual Derwent Awards Ceremony inside D Bar. These events are well attended by college members and provide structure to the committee's annual plan.

Weekly events include cost-of-living events such as Toastie Wednesday's and Jacket Potato Fridays, where the JCRC or college management provide free food to college members to help reduce costs.

== Notable people ==
- Greg Dyke (politics alumnus and former University Chancellor)
- Jung Chang
- Harry Enfield
- Sara Davies
- James Callis
