= Stepney Sisters =

Stepney Sisters, originally Expensive, were a trio of "feminist musical trailblazers" who formed whilst students at the University of York in 1973.

The founding members were singer Caroline Gilfillan, bassist Marion “Benni” Lees, and saxophonist Ruthie Smith.

They were the support act for Bob Marley and the Wailers at Langwith College in 1973, and Marley was so impressed that he asked them to join the group, but they chose to finish their degrees.
