= Derrymore =

Derrymore may refer to:

Australia

- Derrymore, Queensland

Northern Ireland

- Derrymore, County Antrim

Republic of Ireland

- Derrymore, County Kerry
- Derrymore, County Westmeath, a townland in the civil parish of Killucan
