= The Deramore Arms =

Pub in North Yorkshire, England

- The pub in 2025
- Former names: The Ship; The Fox; The Yarburgh Arms
- Alternative names: The Derry

General information
- Type: Public house
- Location: Main Street, Heslington, York, England
- Coordinates: 53°56′38″N 1°02′37″W
- Owner: Greene King

The Deramore Arms, commonly referred to as The Derry, is a pub in Heslington, a suburban village in the City of York, England.

== History ==
There were three alehouses in Heslington, but by 1823 only two remained. At that time the pub was called The Ship. In 1840 it was known as The Fox, and by 1872 it had become The Yarburgh Arms, a name updated to The Deramore Arms in 1967.

During the Second World War several RAF Bomber Command sites were located around Heslington, and the Deramore Arms was often filled with air force personnel. A race involving personnel riding atop a stuffed rhinoceros taken from Heslington Hall was reportedly held between The Charles and the Deramore Arms along what is now Main Street.

When the University of York opened in 1963, the pub proved popular with students. It was initially the haunt of athletic students. In more recent years the Deramore has been regarded as the "local" pub, while The Charles caters more to students, although there is considerable crossover between the two. Its popularity with university sports teams has continued, with Heslington Parish Council noting its traditional role as a gathering place after matches and the starting point for pub crawls. The pub has also been a favoured venue for attendees of university conferences, and a useful location for academics to develop their work.

The pub has occasionally seen friction between students and local residents. An attempt by The Spirit Group, then the owner, to extend opening hours in 2005 was successfully challenged by the local community.

The Deramore Arms was the site of the short-lived Four Thorns Brewery, although the venture proved unsustainable. The pub closed in August 2016 when the licensees stated that it was financially unviable to remain open, but it reopened in May 2017. In recognition of its value to the local community, Heslington Parish Council secured its listing as an asset of community value by City of York Council in 2017. In November 2023 the pub closed again, reopening shortly after Christmas and hosting Shaun Wallace for one of its regular quizzes in May 2024. As of September 2026, the freehold is owned by Greene King.

== Origin of name ==
The pub is named after the last family to live in Heslington Hall, the village's county manor. The Deramore baronetcy had a close connection with the village, but after selling the hall in 1956 they ceased to be as core a part of the local community. The family name of 'de Yarburgh-Bateson' was the origin of the precursor name of 'The Yarburgh Arms', but in 1967 the name was changed to the family title.
