= Heslington Hoard =

Roman coin hoard found in York, England

Coordinates: 53.949455°N 1.0503974°W

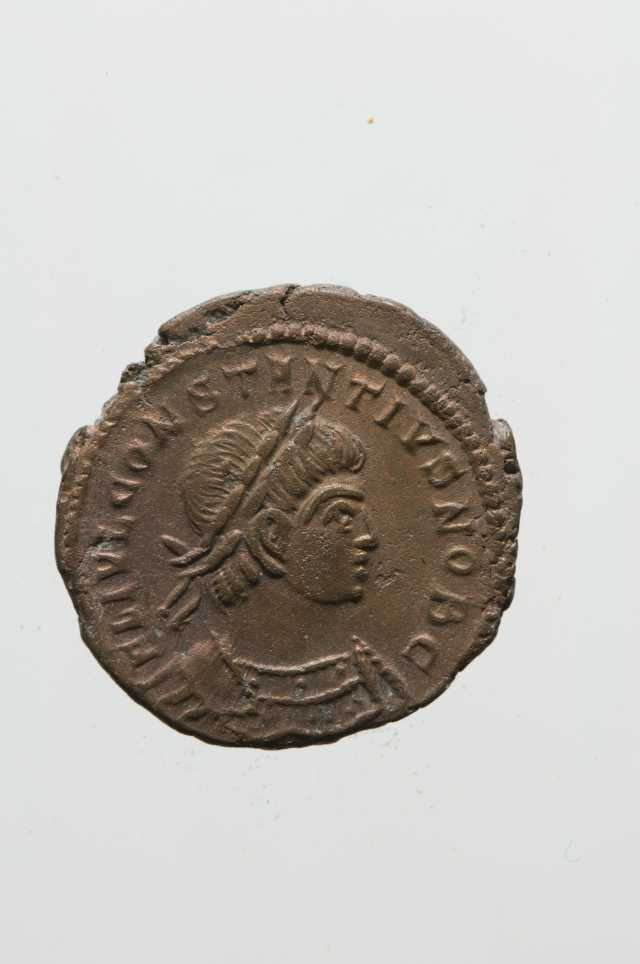
- Coin from the hoard depicting Constantius II, AD 330-335
- Material: Roman coins Roman pottery
- Size: c.2,800 coins
- Created: Shortly after AD 355
- Period/culture: Romano-British
- Discovered: 1966; Heslington, York, England
- Present location: Yorkshire Museum, York
- Identification: YORYM: 2014.395

The Heslington Hoard is a coin hoard found in York, England, dating from the mid-4th century AD. It consisted of approximately 2,800 coins held within a pottery container. It was acquired by the Yorkshire Museum.

== Discovery ==
The hoard was found by on 1 March 1966 at Heslington, York during excavations in advance of the construction of 'College 3' on the campus of the University of York.

== Contents ==
More than half of the hoard is composed of contemporary copies of coins, and 1,158 may be regarded as true issues. Apart from two third-century silver coins – one of Tetricus I and one of Tacitus – the remainder are copper coins from the 4th century. Various Emperors from the Constantinian dynasty are depicted on the coinage. The two latest dated coins are of the Emperor Julian and the hoard is considered to have been sealed and deposited shortly after AD 355.
