= Norman Rea Gallery =

Art gallery in York, England

The Norman Rea Gallery is the only student run art gallery in the United Kingdom. It is based at the University of York, with premises in Derwent College, above the Courtyard Bar in the main quad. It is affiliated with the University of York Students' Union.

== History ==
The gallery was established by Norman Rea, who was the provost of Langwith College from 1974 to 1997. He wanted to make art accessible to students, and to provide facilities for new artists to display their art. It was opened in 1976. The original university buildings did not include an art gallery, so temporary displays were made in other rooms, including the junior common rooms in Derwent College and Langwith College. A suitable location for a permanent art gallery was found in a corridor that joined the English Department with the Education Department in Langwith College. Initially the gallery was not managed by students, and it went under a different name, but it was renamed the Norman Rea Gallery on his retirement. When Langwith College moved to East Campus, the gallery became part of Derwent College.

== About ==
Part of the gallery's significance derives from it being the only student-run art gallery in the country, with its popularity reflecting how alive and genuine the student art world is in York. Exhibitions are held throughout the academic year, with visitors from outside the university being welcome to attend its events. Society events are organised by a committee, which is headed by two co-directors. The gallery allows work to be exhibited for free.

== Awards ==
The Norman Rea Gallery won Arts and Cultural Society of the Year at the YUSU Activities Awards in June 2023.

== Directorship ==
Academic Year	Director(s)
2026/27	Milly Evans and Lauren Walker
2025/26	Elizabeth Jones and Charlotte Whitehill
2024/25	Iris Beck and Evie Brett
2023/24	Eleanor Getting and Amelia Stallworthy
2022/23	Sophie Norton and Vienna Shelley
