= Heslington =

Village and civil parish in North Yorkshire, England

Coordinates: 53.94484°N 1.04336°W

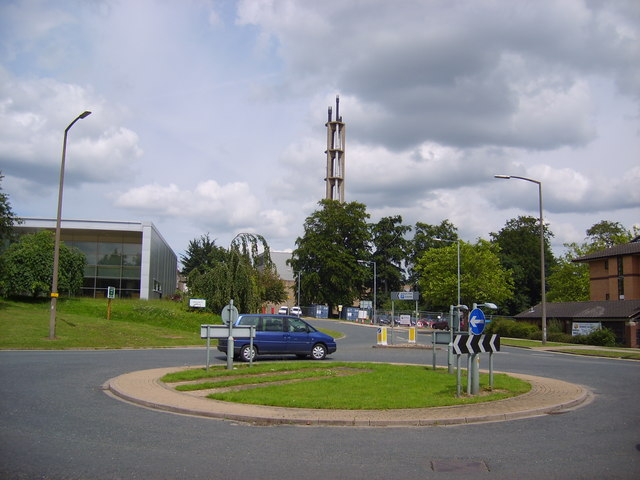
- York Science Park

- Location within North Yorkshire
- Population: 4,792 (2011 census)
- OS grid reference: SE628502
- Civil parish: Heslington
- Unitary authority: City of York
- Ceremonial county: North Yorkshire
- Region: Yorkshire and the Humber
- Country: England
- Sovereign state: United Kingdom
- Post town: YORK
- Postcode district: YO10
- Police: North Yorkshire
- Fire: North Yorkshire
- Ambulance: Yorkshire
- UK Parliament: York Outer

Heslington is a suburban village and civil parish within the City of York district, in the ceremonial county of North Yorkshire, England, south-east of the centre of York. Before 1974, it was a village in the Derwent Rural District, which was part of the East Riding of Yorkshire. From 1974 to 1996, it was part of the Selby district, before becoming part of the new City of York unitary authority area.

The University of York's Campus West, including Heslington Hall, are located in Heslington.

== History ==
The name Heslington derives from the Old English hæslingtūn meaning 'settlement growing with hazel'.

Heslington was likely an Anglian settlement and is mentioned in the Domesday Book.

Heslington Hall was built between 1565 and 1568 for Sir Thomas Eynns. In the 20th century it was owned by Richard de Yarburgh-Bateson, 6th Baron Deramore, and was used as the headquarters for the Royal Air Force's No. 4 (Bomber) Group from 1940 to 1945. It is now the administrative headquarters for the University of York. Other notable buildings include Little Hall, Manor House, Lime Tree Farm, Village Farm, and the Lady Deramore Memorial Cottages. Heslington became a Conservation Area in 1969.

=== Heslington hoard ===
The hoard of 2,800 Roman coins, known as the Heslington Hoard, was found on 1 March 1966 during excavations in advance of the construction of 'College 3' on the west campus of the University of York.

== Amenities ==
According to the 2011 census the ward had a population of 4,792. The parish also includes the Badger Hill area. Lord Deramore's Primary School serves the residents of the Heslington, the nearby Badger Hill estate, and the families of the scholars of the University of York.

Heslington Church is a Grade II listed building and is a local ecumenical partnership between the Church of England and the Methodist Church.

Heslington Main Street has a post office, a bakery and two pubs; The Deramore Arms and The Charles XII.

The University of York's Campus West is situated in Heslington. A further campus, Campus East, is located to the east of the village. Construction began in 2007 to some controversy from village residents concerned about traffic and Heslington's small village status. The planning application went to public enquiry and the project was approved by the Department of Communities and Local Government in May 2007. The new campus opened in October 2009.

== Cricket ==
After 92 years of existence, Heslington Cricket Club folded in 2003 amid a certain amount of turmoil. This was not the end of cricket in the village however, as 2003 was also the year that York Civil Service Cricket Club lost their ground at Boroughbridge Road, York and were offered the opportunity to play at Heslington from the 2004 season. They have now rebranded as Heslington Cricket Club. Heslington Cricket Club has since grown considerably, now fielding four Seniors teams as well as Juniors teams from Under 9s to Under 15s.

== Gallery ==
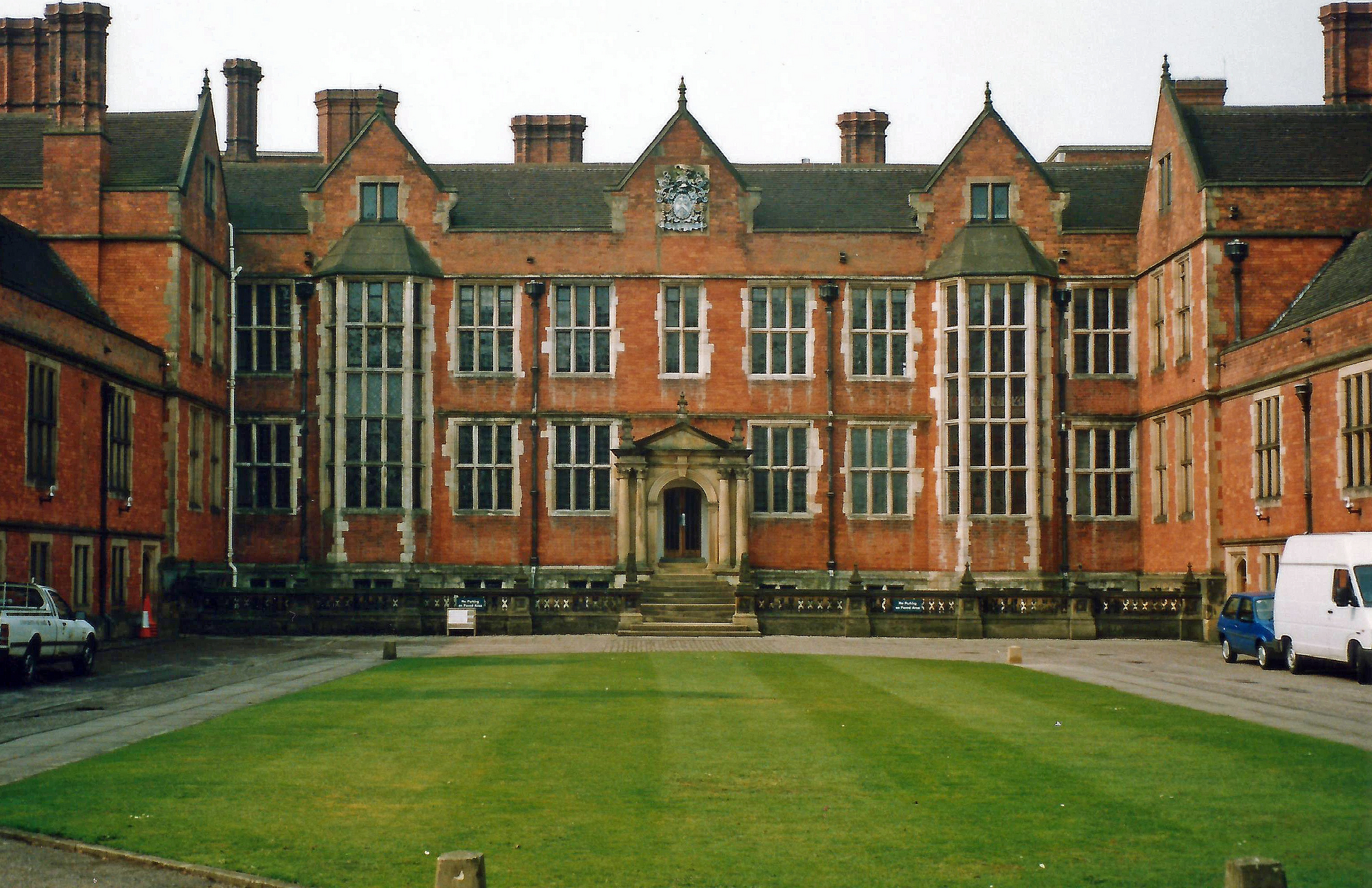
Heslington Hall

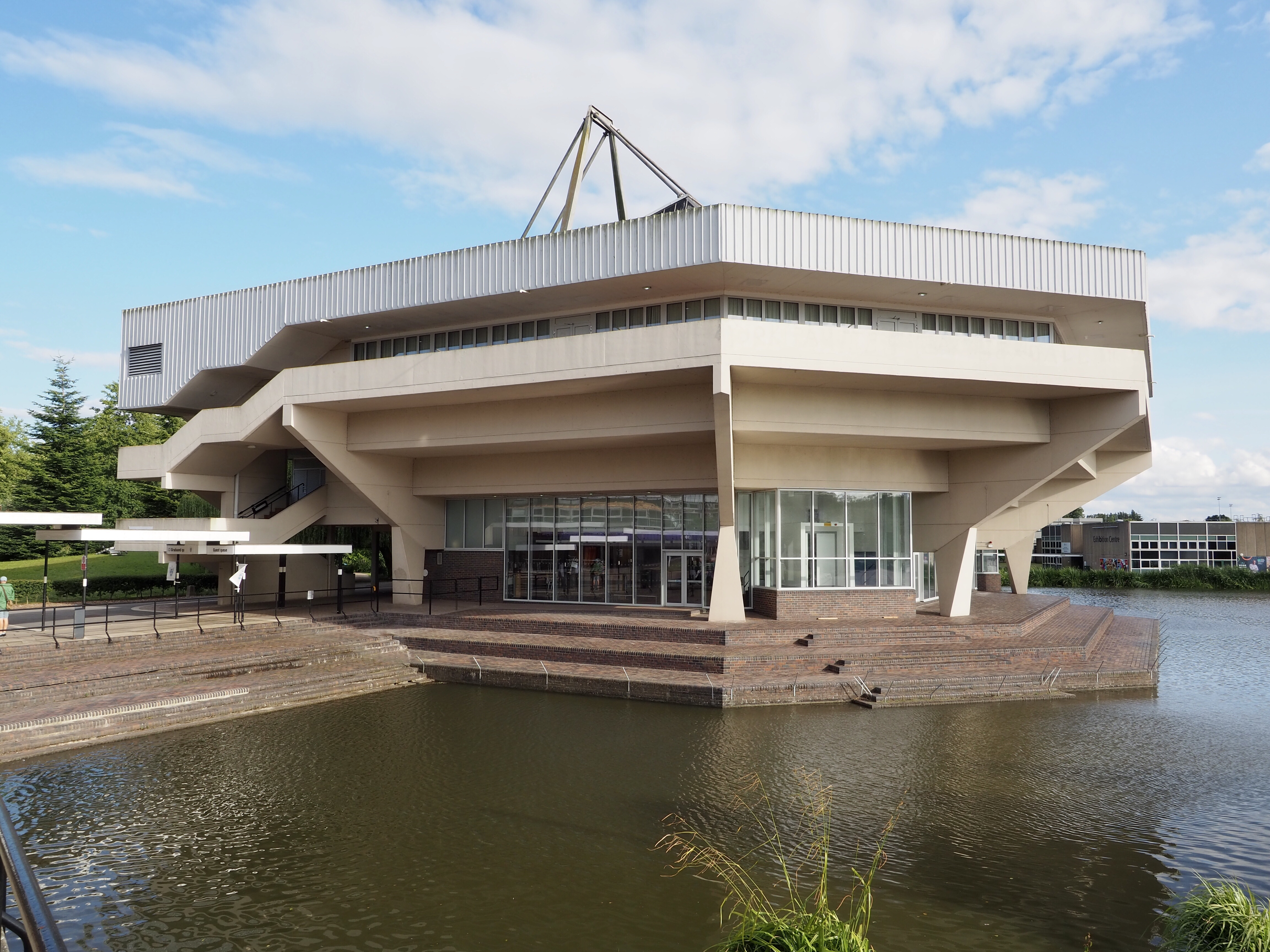
University of York Central Hall

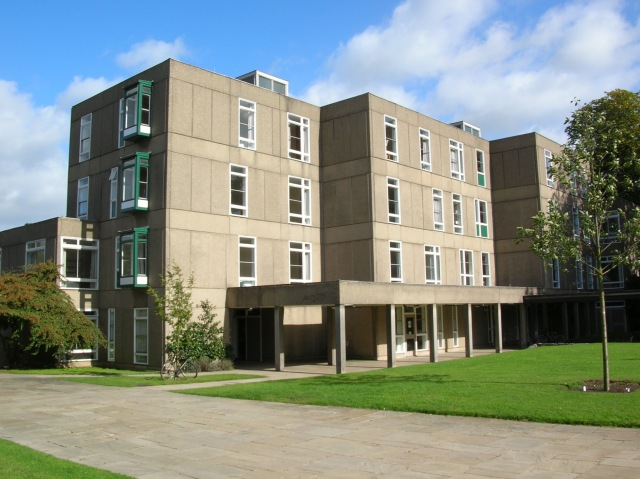
Derwent College accommodation block C

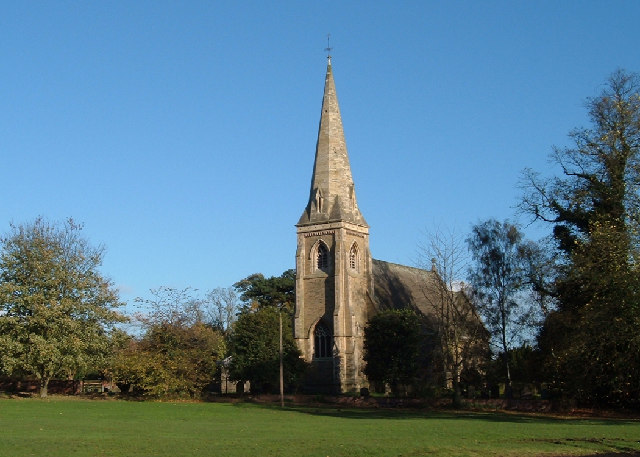
Heslington Church

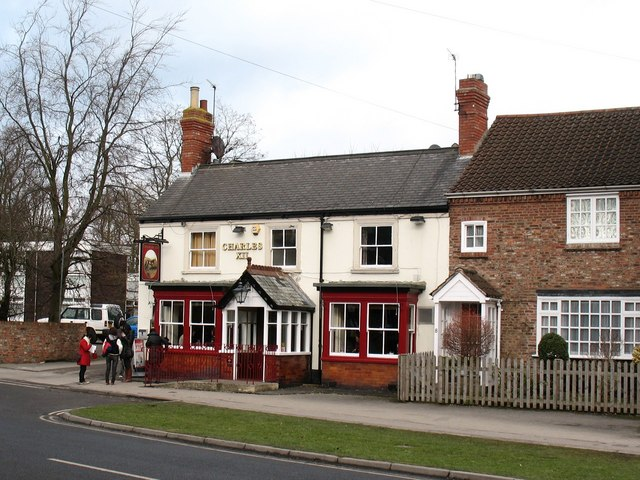
The Charles XII

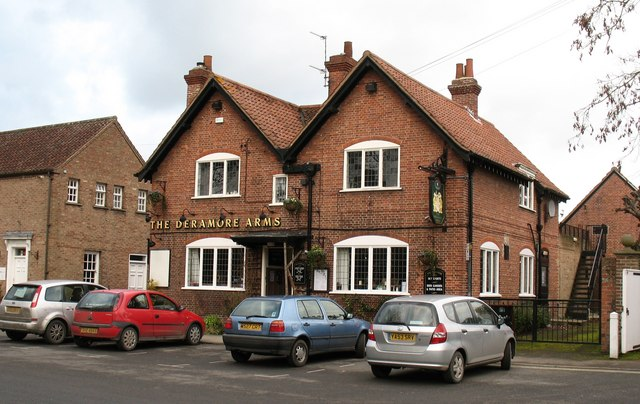
The Deramore Arms

== See also ==
- Heslington Brain
