= Longcat =

Domestic cat (2002–2020)

Shiro (シロ)
- Longcat c. 2005
- Other names: Nobiko-san (のび子さん), Nobīru-tan (のびーるたん), Longcat
- Species: Felis catus
- Born: 2002; Japan
- Died: 20 September 2020 (aged 18)
- Known for: Length; Subject of an Internet meme
- Owner: Miko

Shiro (シロ; (Note: "Shiro" (シロ) is a word derived from "white" (白い).) c. 2002 – 20 September 2020), nicknamed online as Longcat, was a Japanese domestic cat that became the subject of an Internet meme due to her length. An image depicting her being held with "outstretched paws" became popular on Japanese imageboard Futaba Channel, where it was nicknamed Nobīru-tan (Note: "-tan" (たん) is a childish word for the suffix "-chan" (ちゃん) used when referring to people.) (のびーるたん (Note: Written のびーるたん)) and Nobiko-san (のび子さん (Note: Written のび子さん)) some time around 2005 or 2006. She was reportedly 65 centimetres (26 in) "from head to toe".

Subsequently, the meme spread to English-language websites, primarily 4chan's /b/, where it was edited into various images, and even had a song written about it. A backstory was invented for the cat, involving a world-ending battle called "Catnarok" with a nemesis named "Tacgnol" (resembling Longcat with the colors inverted).

In a 2019 interview, Longcat's owner said that the cat was "originally rescued after being discovered on the street in 2002", and at the time was thin with gray hair; as she grew older, she became white and fluffy. The cat was deaf. In 2019, Longcat's owner said that, at age 17, the cat no longer "climbed to high places" but was "relaxing and living her life". In September 2020, after a period of ill health, Longcat was taken to the hospital, and died at age 18.

A Pokémon design released in 2019, "Gigantamax Meowth", was compared by some commentators to Longcat.

== See also ==
- List of individual cats
- Cats and the Internet
- Long Boi
