= Central Hall, University of York =

Central Hall
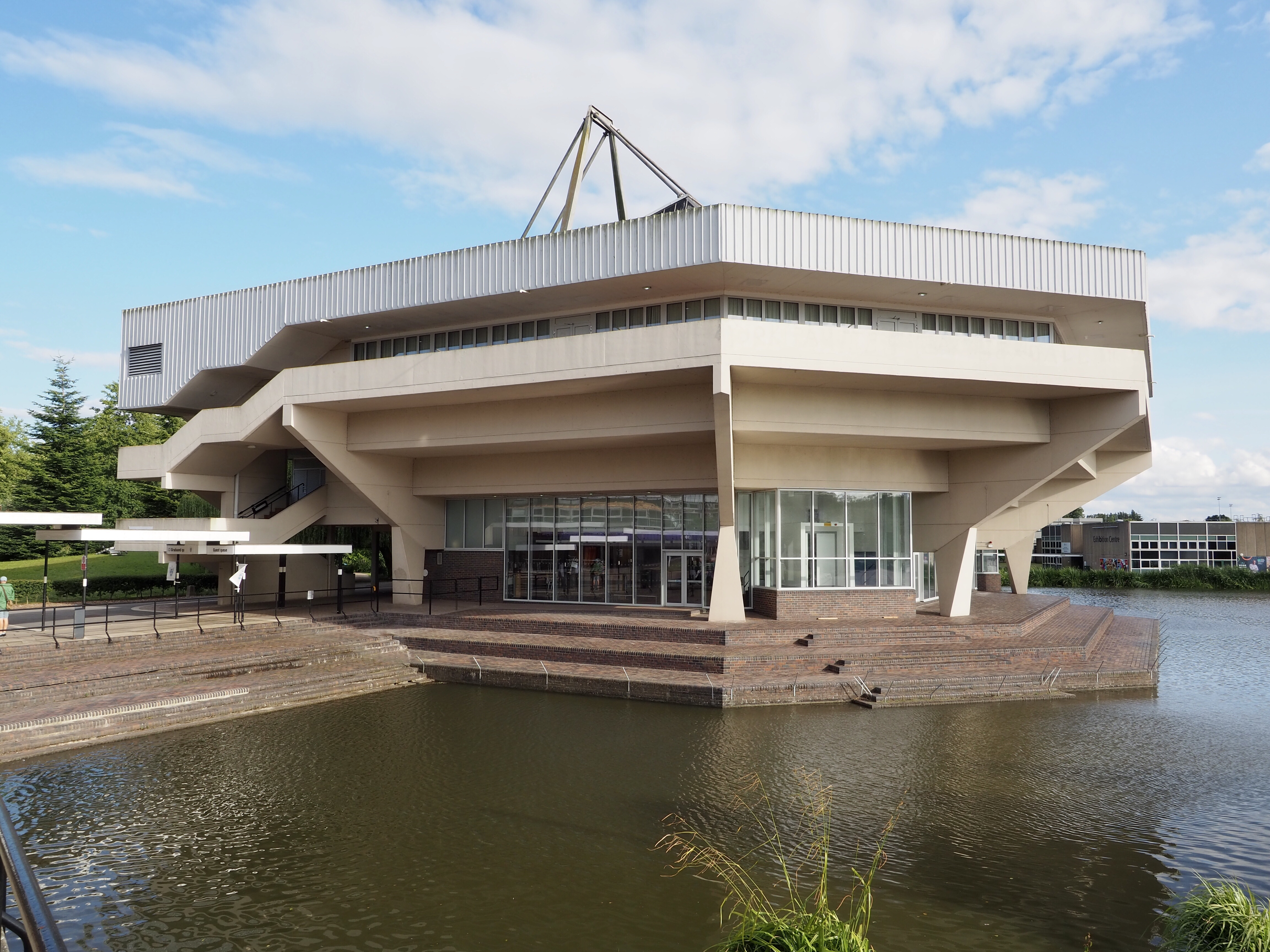
- Central Hall, viewed from Greg's Place, Vanbrugh College
- Interactive map of the Central Hall area
- Alternative names: The Spaceship (colloquial)

General information
- Type: Examination hall and lecture hall
- Architectural style: Brutalism
- Location: Heslington, York
- Coordinates: 53°56′49″N 1°03′10″W
- Construction started: 1966
- Construction stopped: 1968
- Owner: University of York

Design and construction
- Architects: Robert Matthew and Johnson-Marshall & Partners
- Structural engineer: Robert Owston
- Other designers: John Speight (designer); Michael Gibbs (assistant designer); Henry Robert Humphreys (acoustical consultant)

Listed Building – Grade II
- Official name: Central Hall, University of York
- Designated: 22 August 2018
- Reference no.: 1456551

Central Hall (colloquially known as "The Spaceship" for the similar appearance to a UFO) is a building of the University of York, England, designed by John Speight in the brutalist style. It was constructed in 1966–1968. The hall is seen as a tour de force of the university, appearing on merchandise and often used as a background for university publicity. It is Grade II listed.

== History ==
The 1970s saw some notable acts and bands perform at the hall, including The Who and The Kinks.

In 1985, Boomtown Rats played at the hall. During the performance, Bob Geldof called on the audience to come closer and dance. Nearly 300 people rushed forwards and danced on the orchestra pit cover, causing over £1,000 worth of damage. As a result of this damage, no band has been allowed to play in Central Hall since. Precisely what did happen is up for debate. Student newspaper issues from the time are unaccounted for and subsequent issues follow different accounts.

The brutalist appearance of the hall has attracted critics. In 2014 Professor John Rentoul, writing in the Independent on Sunday, placed the hall in 7th place of the ugliest buildings in Britain.

During COVID-19, Central Hall was one of the locations that the university used to administer vaccines.

The prominent location of the hall has made it an attractive location for protests over the years. In 1993, the hall was occupied for one night by students protesting against a planned cut in student grants, in 2021 anti-Conservative graffiti was scrawled on the side, while in 2023 student member of Plant Based Universities hung a banner on Central Hall and let off non-toxic flares.

== Nature of the building ==
As with the rest of the first phase of buildings at the university, the Hall directly integrates with the surrounding nature, allowing the appearance of a country park to continue undisrupted. The cantilevers allow the building to stand out from its surroundings, but not aggressively. Most of the buildings of this phases notably used the CLASP (Consortium of Local Authorities Special Programme) system, but the size of the Hall saw it constructed out of a reinforced concrete.

The ground floor is mainly a large foyer with glass walls looking out over the lake. The first floor is the auditorium, with tiered seating on three sides of the stage stairs lead from the foyer to the bottom of the auditorium, but external stairs and an external balcony gives access to the top of the auditorium. The Hall has a maximum capacity of 1,100.

== Location ==
It is in a prominent position in the university's West Campus, in the centre of the bank of the lake. Covered walkways to the east and west connect the Hall with Derwent College and Vanbrugh College respectively. To the north is the Berrick Saul Building while the Exhibition Centre can be accessed using the Central Hall Bridge that crosses the lake.

== Use ==
During the planning of the university, it was decided to maintain the tradition of red-brick universities of constructing a great hall for important events. The primary function of the hall is that of an examination hall and a lecture theatre. As a centrepiece, it has multiple functions, extending to concerts, ceremonial events, and conferences.

== Popular culture ==
The hall is prominent in the logos of university societies. It is featured on the University of York Labour Club, while a silhouette of the building is the logo of the York Dialectic Union.

== See also ==
- List of Brutalist structures
