= Dereham (disambiguation) =

Dereham is a town in Norfolk, England, sometimes called East Dereham

Dereham may also refer to:

- West Dereham, village in Norfolk, England
- Elias of Dereham (died 1246), English master stonemason
- Francis Dereham (c.1513–1541), English courtier
- Sir Thomas Dereham, 4th Baronet (c.1678–1739), English scientist and Jacobite

== See also ==
- Derham (disambiguation)
- Battle of Deorham
