= Derrymore, County Kerry =

Derrymore Doire Mór
- Town
- Location in Ireland
- Coordinates: 52°14′15″N 9°50′40″W
- Country: Ireland
- Province: Munster
- County: County Kerry
- Elevation: 50 m (160 ft)
- Time zone: UTC+0 (WET)
  - Summer (DST): UTC-1 (IST (WEST))
- Irish Grid Reference: Q740128

Derrymore (Irish: Doire Mór) is a rural district of County Kerry in south-west Ireland. It lies between the Slieve Mish mountains and the Atlantic Ocean, some 11 km (7 mi) west of Tralee on the Dingle peninsula. A sandy beach, known as Derrymore Strand, is quite popular with locals and tourists during the summer months. Derrymore Island is a nature reserve supporting many rare plant communities and is an important high-tide roosting area for shore birds.

The name Derrymore is an anglicization of the Irish doire mór, meaning "great oak grove".
