= Brigid Derham =

British artist (1943-1980)

- Born: 1943; London, England
- Died: 1980 (aged 36–37); London, England
- Known for: Abstract painting

Bridget Derham, known as Brigid Derham, (1943-1980) was a British artist who was a prolific painter of large, colourful, often abstract, pictures.

== Biography ==
Derham was born in London and studied at the Slade School of Art from 1961, earning a distinction with her 1965 diploma in painting and completing her post-graduate diploma in 1966. At the Slade she was taught by Frank Auerbach and won several prizes. These included the Walter Neurath Prize for drawing and painting in 1962 and travelling scholarships in both 1965 and 1966. One of these was an Italian government scholarship which allowed her to study in Italy for a time. Derham taught part-time at the Byam Shaw School of Art and occasionally also gave lessions at the Slade. Her first solo exhibition was at the New Art Centre in London in 1971. The Arts Council of Great Britain supported Derham with a grant award in 1972 and included her in their 1974 group show British Painting '74. Other group shows at both the New Art Centre and the Royal Academy in London followed. Derham died in London in 1980.
