= Richard de Yarburgh-Bateson, 6th Baron Deramore =

British architect, writer of erotic fiction and peer

Richard Arthur de Yarburgh-Bateson, 6th Baron Deramore (9 April 1911 – 20 August 2006) was a British architect, writer of erotic fiction, and a peer of the United Kingdom.

Lord Deramore was educated at Harrow School and St John's College, Cambridge, and after graduation he earned a diploma from the Architectural Association School of Architecture. He worked as a charted architect in London, Buckinghamshire, and Yorkshire.

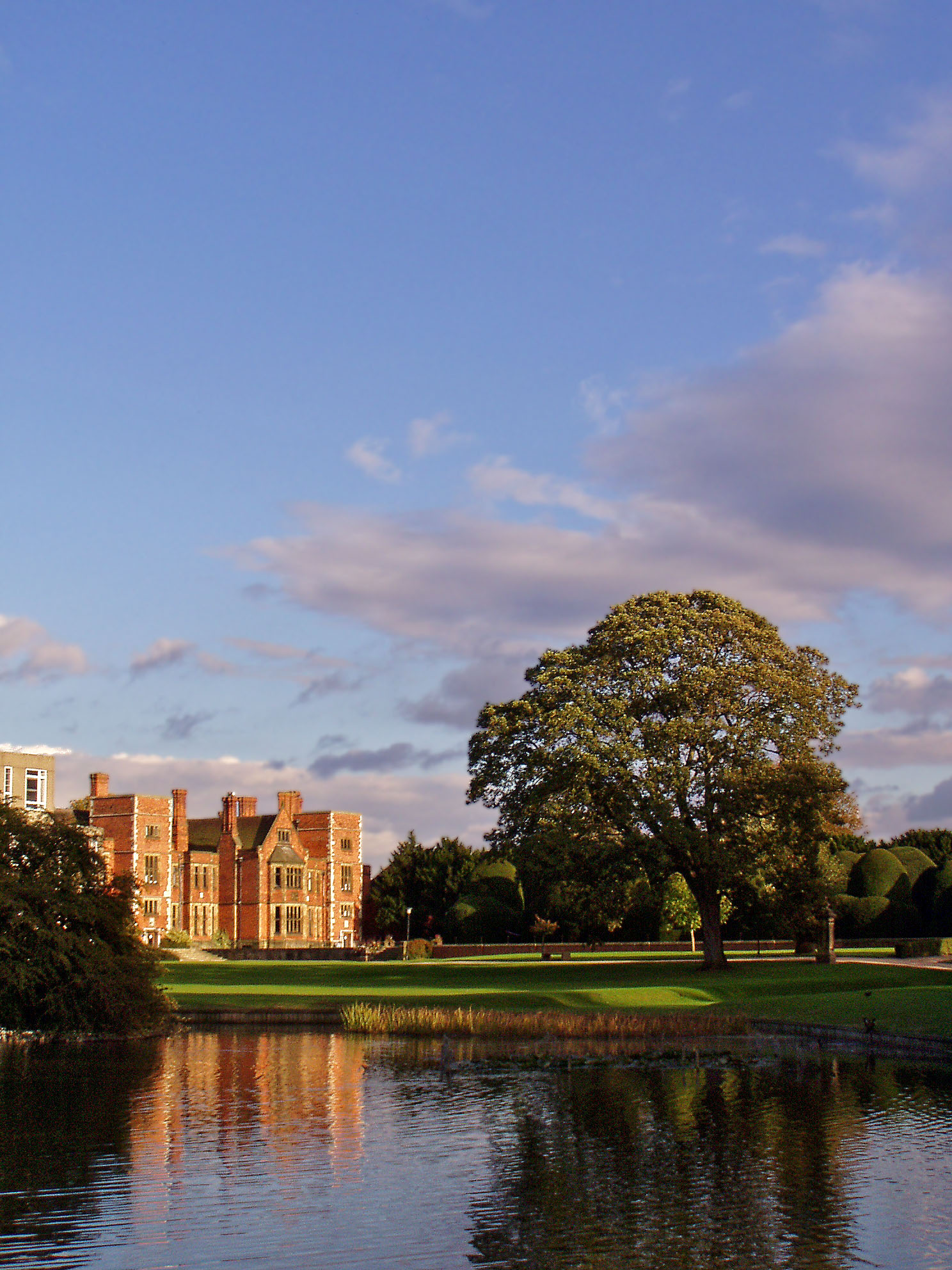
The former family home at Heslington Hall.

During World War II, Lord Deramore served as a pilot in the RAFVR, flying low-level reconnaissance missions in the Mediterranean. After the war, he returned to his architectural practice, but also pursued other interests. He designed his own home, to replace the family seat at Heslington Hall. The Hall had been taken over by the RAF in the war and remained unoccupied afterwards, until it was sold to become the headquarters of the University of York in 1962.

He married Janet Ware in 1948, and their only child, a daughter, was born in 1950. In 1964, he became the 6th Baron Deramore and 7th Baronet upon the death of his elder brother, the 5th Baron Deramore.

Determined to pursue a career as a writer, he collected many rejection letters before a short story, A Touch of Bird Lime, was published. His first novel, Still Waters was published in 1997.

He lost his seat in the House of Lords after the House of Lords Act 1999. Upon his death in 2006, aged 95, the barony and baronetcy became extinct.

Peerage of the United Kingdom
Preceded by Stephen de Yarburgh-Bateson	Baron Deramore; 1964–2006	Extinct
