= Langwith College, York =

College of the University of York, England

Coordinates: 53.94880°N 1.02825°W

Langwith College
- University of York
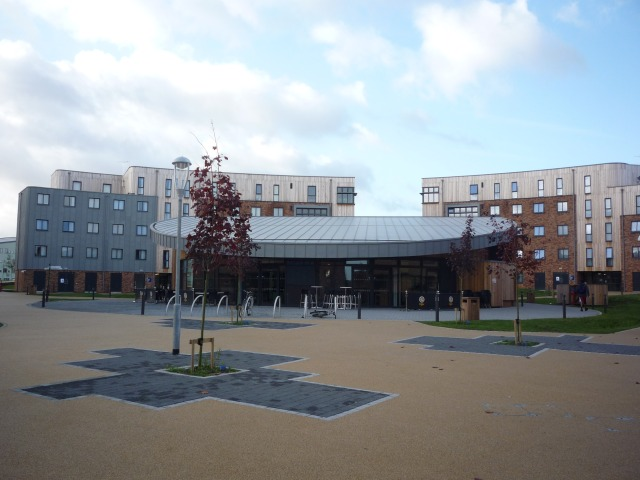
- The centre building in the new Langwith College site on Heslington East
- Location: Heslington East, York
- Motto: Latin: Vincit qui se vincit
- Motto in English: He conquers who conquers himself
- Established: 1965
- Named for: Langwith Common
- Undergraduates: 1,630 (2022/2023)
- Postgraduates: 235 (2022/2023)
- Mascot: The Langaroo
- Website: Langwith College
- Student association: Student Association

Langwith College is a college of the University of York. Alongside Derwent College it was a founding college of the university, and is named after the nearby Langwith Common.

== History ==
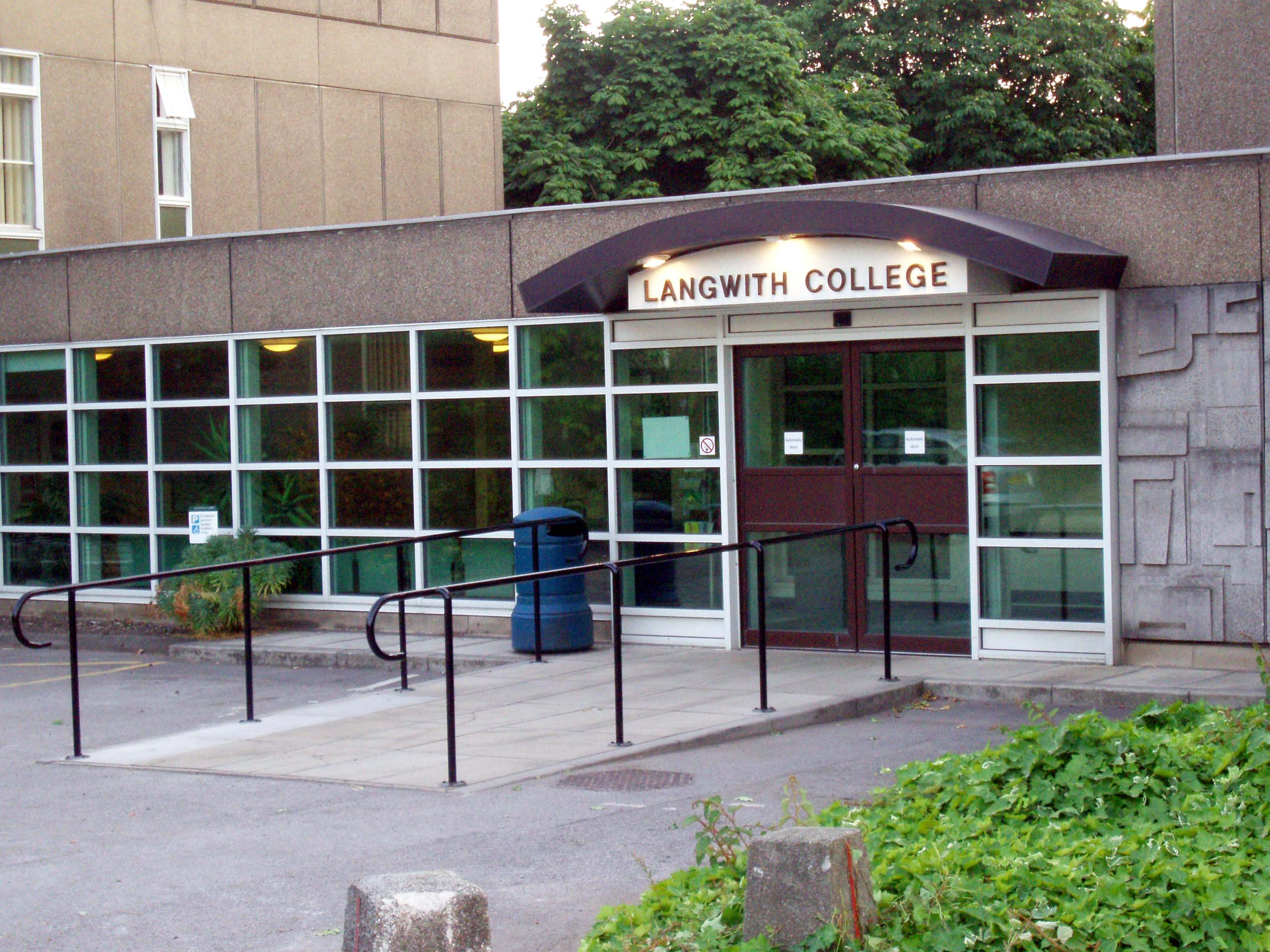
The front entrance of the old Langwith College site on Heslington West

Langwith, alongside Derwent is one of the founding colleges at the University of York, and was officially opened by Queen Elizabeth II on 22 October 1965. After having hosted Jimi Hendrix in 1967 however, the day to day history of Langwith College is largely undocumented, with much of the documentation from the early years being lost. The college has an ongoing appeal to its alumni for any help they can be to chart and illustrate the history of Langwith. One of the buildings in the former Langwith College (now Derwent L Block), Hendrix Hall, is named after the 1967 Jimi Hendrix visit. The room is a lecture theatre and multi-purpose event space.

In 2003, the university set out plans to create a campus for 5,000 additional students, Heslington East. In 2012 Langwith moved to Heslington East and Derwent took over its previous buildings.

== Buildings and services ==
Langwith College is split across four courts: Sydney Smith Court, Gordon and Francesca Horsfield Court, John West Taylor Court and Philip Brockbank Court; all of which are named after members of the university who have significantly contributed to student life.

The new £30m buildings house 650 students in a circular formation, and is home to both undergraduates and postgraduates. 'The Glasshouse' bar is located in the Langwith Centre Building and is managed by the Students' Union. Within the Centre Building is a launderette and a small study room, the 'Tom Lynch', for students. In October 2015, two new common rooms were built within the college, for students to relax and study in - the Corner Room and the Basement. The college is located nearby the brand new York Sports Village, which plays host to some of the best sports people across the university.

== Organisation and administration ==
The college principal is a university academic who shares teaching duties with college responsibilities. The principal is supported by the College Team, a team of full-time members of staff who have responsibility for community, welfare and day-to-day affairs. The incumbent Head is Jeremy Jacob.

The College Team is supported by a team of part-time College Tutors, who are live-in students. The College Administrator manages the administrative affairs of the college.

== Student life ==
Langwith has a strong rivalry with Derwent College. In 2015 Langwith was named as one of the top 50 halls in the UK.

=== Student representation ===
All undergraduate residents are members of the College Student Association, (formerly the Junior Common Room). Its committee is elected annually and is responsible for representing the interests of Langwith students. The committee consists of various roles and focuses on events, community and college activities. Although branded as a Student Association, Langwith retains a Graduate Common Room and a Senior Common Room Committee and therefore the SA plays the same role as a JCRC in the other colleges.

== See also ==
- Stepney Sisters
