= Charles the Twelfth =

British-bred Thoroughbred racehorse

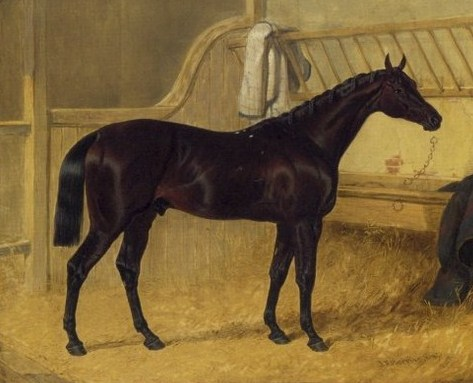
- Charles XII Winner 1839 St. Leger by John Frederick Herring
- Sire: Voltaire
- Grandsire: Blacklock
- Dam: Wagtail
- Damsire: Prime Minister
- Sex: Stallion
- Foaled: 1836
- Country: United Kingdom
- Colour: Brown
- Breeder: Major Nicholas Yarburgh
- Owner: Major Yarburgh; Andrew Johnstone
- Trainer: John Scott
- Record: 34: 19-6-2

Major wins
- Liverpool Tradesmen's Cup (1839); Great St Leger Stakes (1839); Doncaster Cup (1839); Grosvenor Stakes (1840); Catterick Gold Cup (1841); Newcastle Craven Stakes (1841, 1843); Goodwood Cup (1841 1842); Cleveland Cup (1841); RCH Challenge Whip (1841, 1842); Queen's Plate at Stirling (1841); Queen's Plate at Edinburgh (1841); Dumfries Gold Cup (1841, 1842); Roxburgh Gold Cup (1841); Match against Hyllus (1842)

Charles the Twelfth (1836–1859) was a British Thoroughbred racehorse and sire best known for winning the classic St Leger Stakes in 1839. He ran a dead-heat with Euclid in the classic before winning the prize in a deciding heat.

In a racing career which lasted from July 1839 until September 1843 he won nineteen of his thirty-four races. Unraced as a two-year-old, Charles the Twelfth was unbeaten in three races as a three-year-old in 1839. He won the Liverpool Tradesmen's Cup before winning the St Leger and then beat a strong field of older horses in the Doncaster Cup. Charles the Twelfth remained in training for four more years, winning once in 1840, ten times in 1841, four times in 1842 and once in 1843. He won the Goodwood Cup in 1841 and 1842.

Charles the Twelfth was retired to stud after the 1843 season, but had little success as a sire of winners.

== Background ==
Charles the Twelfth was a "very fine and racing-like" dark brown horse standing sixteen hands high bred by Major Nicholas Yarburgh of Heslington Hall in North Yorkshire. Yarburgh sent the colt into training with John Scott who trained forty classic winners at his base at Whitewall stables, Malton, North Yorkshire.

Charles the Twelfth was the eleventh foal produced by Yarburgh's mare Wagtail, an influential broodmare who is regarded as the Foundation mare of Thoroughbred family 21-a: her modern direct descendants include Humble Duty, Exceller and Doyoun.

Charles the Twelfth's sire, Voltaire was a successful racehorse who won the Doncaster Cup in 1829. He went on to become a good stallion, with his best son apart from Charles the Twelfth being the Derby and St Leger winner Voltigeur.

== Racing career ==
=== 1839: three-year-old season ===
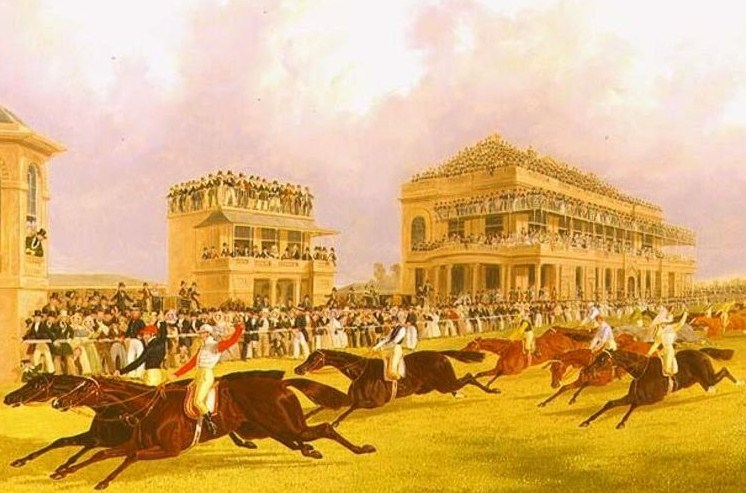
The dead-heat between Charles the Twelfth and Euclid in the 1839 St Leger

Charles the Twelfth was unraced as a two-year-old and made his first appearance in July 1839 at Aintree Racecourse. He was assigned a weight of six stones and six pounds in the Liverpool Tradesmen's Cup, an all-aged handicap race over two miles and started at odds of 5/1 in a field of sixteen runners. Ridden by a lightweight jockey named Francis, Charles the Twelfth disputed the lead with the five-year-old St Bennett before pulling clear in the closing stages to win easily. The New Sporting Magazine described the performance as a "true St Leger running".

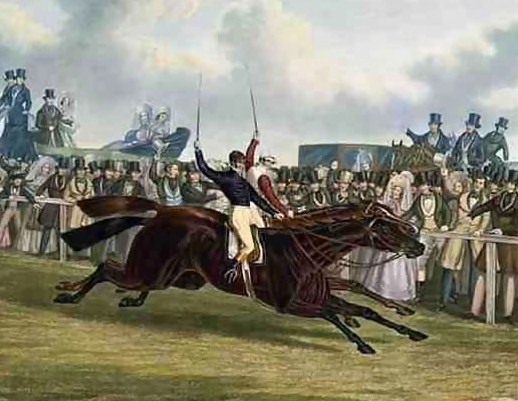
Charles the Twelfth beats Euclid in the deciding heat of the St Leger

On 17 September Charles the Twelfth was one of fourteen runners (from an original entry of 107) to contest the St Leger Stakes: he was ridden by his trainer's brother Bill Scott and was made the 6/4 favourite ahead of the Derby winner Bloomsbury. The weather was cold and wet, leading to heavy ground and an unusually poor attendance. Bill Scott attempted to repeat the tactics he had employed on Don John the previous year by taking the lead shortly after the start and setting a very fast pace. Most of the other horses were well-beaten before the turn into the straight, but as Charles the Twelfth approached the final furlong Euclid, ridden by Patrick Conolly, emerged as a serious challenger. Euclid briefly overtook Charles the Twelfth and appeared the likely winner but the favourite rallied and after a "head and head" struggle the two colts crossed the finishing line together. The judge declared a dead heat and the owners agreed to run a run-off. Both horses had appeared "much distressed" after the race which was run in 3 minutes 25 seconds. The early stages deciding heat, for which Euclid started a slight favourite, were run at a very slow pace, as both jockeys attempted to employ waiting tactics. Conolly eventually sent Euclid into the lead which he held until Charles the Twelfth made his challenge in the straight. As in the first race, the two colts raced together throughout the closing stages, but Bill Scott always appeared to have the upper hand and Charles the Twelfth won "rather cleverly" by a head. The time for the second heat was 3:45.

Two days later Charles the Twelfth was matched against older horses, including the leading stayers Bee's-wing and Lanercost in the Doncaster Cup over two miles five furlongs. Despite the facts that state of the ground had deteriorated further and that he was carrying a three-pound weight penalty he started the 11/8 favourite. Bee's-wing made the early running but faded in the straight. Lanercost looked the likely winner, but the three-year-old demonstrated "courage and energy of the first order" to take the lead in the last strides to win by a head.

=== 1840: four-year-old season ===
Before the start of the 1840 season, Charles the Twelfth was sold to the Scottish businessman Andrew Johnstone. Charles the Twelfth made his first appearance as a four-year-old in the Liverpool Tradesmen's Cup on 15 July. Carrying 125 pounds he sustained his first defeat as he finished third of the sixteen runners behind Lord Westminster's Sleight-of-hand. On the following afternoon he won the Grosvenor Stakes over one and three-quarter miles, beating Lord Westminster's three-year-old Maroon. Later that month Charles the Twelfth finished unplaced behind Beggarman in the Goodwood Cup.

In September, the colt returned to the scene of his classic victory but finished third to Bee's-wing and The Provost in the Doncaster Cup. Later that month he finished last of the four runners behind Gallipot in the Stewards' Cup at Liverpool. On his final appearance of a disappointing season, Charles the Twelfth had his first run in Scotland and was beaten by Lanercost in the Gold Cup at Dumfries.

=== 1841: five-year-old season ===
Charles the Twelfth had his most successful season in 1841, when he won ten of his eleven races. He began his season in April at Catterick Bridge Racecourse in Yorkshire where he won the local Gold Cup from two opponents. and at Newcastle Racecourse in Northumberland on 21 June he defeated Bee's-wing at weight-for-age in the Craven Stakes. In July he started favourite for the Liverpool Tradesmen's Cup despite carrying top weight, but finished unplaced behind Orelia, sustaining the only defeat of the year. Later that month he was one of ten horses to contest the Gold Cup at Goodwood and carried top weight to victory from Hyllus. In August he won the Cleveland Cup at Wolverhampton Racecourse at odds of 5/6 conceding weight to his three opponents.

In the autumn of 1841, Charles the Twelfth competed in Scotland where he was unbeaten in his six races. At the Royal Caledonian Hunt meeting at Stirling in October, he won a 50 sovereign race over two miles, and walked over for the Challenge Whip and a Queen's Plate. Before the end of the month he walked over for another Queen's Plate at Edinburgh and the Gold Cup at Dumfries before beating The Little Known and Master Syntax in the Roxburgh Gold Cup at Kelso.

=== 1842: six-year-old season ===
Charles the Twelfth began his six-year-old season with another race against Bee's-wing and was beaten four lengths by the mare at weight-for age in the Gold Cup at Newcastle in June. At Goodwood in July Charles the Twelfth beat Hyllus by a neck in a £1000 match race over two miles and reappeared two days later for the Goodwood Cup. Ridden by Jem Robinson and carrying top weight of 135 pounds, he won by two lengths from the three-year-old Policy to take the Cup for the second year in succession. At the Doncaster St Leger meeting Charles the Twelfth finished unplaced under top weight of 138 pounds in the Great Yorkshire Handicap and ran second to Bee's-wing in the Doncaster Cup. Later that month Charles the Twelfth ran at Kelso where he finished second to Cabrerea in the Roxburgh Gold Cup and was beaten when attempting to concede 40 pounds to the three-year-old Whistle Blinkie in a two and a half-mile handicap. On 7 October at the Royal Caledonian Hunt meeting at Perth Racecourse Charles the Twelfth retained the Challenge Whip by beating Foxberry over two miles. Six days later he defeated Foxberry again to win his second Dumfries Gold Cup.

=== 1843: seven-year-old season ===
In June 1843 Charles the Twelfth started 5/2 favourite for the Gold Vase at Ascot Racecourse but finished unplaced behind the three-year-old Gorhambury. Later that month at Newcastle he recorded his last win when he won the Craven Stakes over one mile, beating the four-year-old Agreeable but then finished unplaced in the Newcastle Gold Cup. In July Charles the Twelfth carried top weight of 135 pounds in the Goodwood Cup: he started the 9/2 third favourite, but finished unplaced behind Hyllus. Charles the Twelfth returned to Doncaster for his final race in which he finished second to Alice Hawthorn in the Doncaster Cup.

== Stud record ==
Charles the Twelfth began his career as a breeding stallion at Sheffield Lane Paddocks near Ecclesfield in South Yorkshire at a fee of 12 guineas. By 1848 he had moved to George Tattersall's stud at Willesden Paddocks, where he stood at a fee of fifteen guineas. Charles the Twelfth was euthanised on 12 October 1859 and buried at an old quarry near Sheffield.

The most successful of his progeny was the gelding Little Charley, the winner of the 1858 Grand National. Charles the Twelfth's daughter Olga had some influence as a broodmare, being the female-line ancestor of White Nose (Melbourne Cup), Eclair au Chocolat (Prix de l'Arc de Triomphe) and Gallahadion.

== Popular culture ==
In recognition of the achievements of Charles the Twelfth, the alehouse The Bay Horse in Heslington was renamed The Charles XII around 1843. The establishment continues to use the name to this day.

== Sire line tree ==
- Charles the Twelfth
  - Fire Eater
    - Salamander
  - Little Charley

== Pedigree ==
Pedigree of Charles the Twelfth (GB), bay stallion, 1836
Sire Voltaire (GB) 1826	Blacklock; 1814	Whitelock	Hambletonian
Sire Voltaire (GB) 1826	Blacklock; 1814	Whitelock	Rosalind
Sire Voltaire (GB) 1826	Blacklock; 1814	Coriander mare	Coriander
Sire Voltaire (GB) 1826	Blacklock; 1814	Coriander mare	Wildgoose
Sire Voltaire (GB) 1826	Phantom mare 1816	Phantom	Walton^
Sire Voltaire (GB) 1826	Phantom mare 1816	Phantom	Julia
Sire Voltaire (GB) 1826	Phantom mare 1816	Overton mare	Overton
Sire Voltaire (GB) 1826	Phantom mare 1816	Overton mare	Walnut mare
Dam Wagtail (GB) 1818	Prime Minister; 1810	Sancho	Don Quixote
Dam Wagtail (GB) 1818	Prime Minister; 1810	Sancho	Highflyer mare
Dam Wagtail (GB) 1818	Prime Minister; 1810	Miss Hornpipe Teazle	Sir Peter Teazle*^
Dam Wagtail (GB) 1818	Prime Minister; 1810	Miss Hornpipe Teazle	Hornpipe
Dam Wagtail (GB) 1818	Orville mare 1812	Orville	Beningbrough
Dam Wagtail (GB) 1818	Orville mare 1812	Orville	Evelina
Dam Wagtail (GB) 1818	Orville mare 1812	Miss Grimstone	Weazle
Dam Wagtail (GB) 1818	Orville mare 1812	Miss Grimstone	Ancaster mare(Family: 21-a)

*^ Charles the Twelfth is inbred 5S x 4D to the stallion Sir Peter Teazle, meaning that he appears fifth generation (via Walton)^ on the sire side of his pedigree and fourth on the dam side of his pedigree.
