= The Charles XII, York =

Pub in North Yorkshire, England

The Charles XII
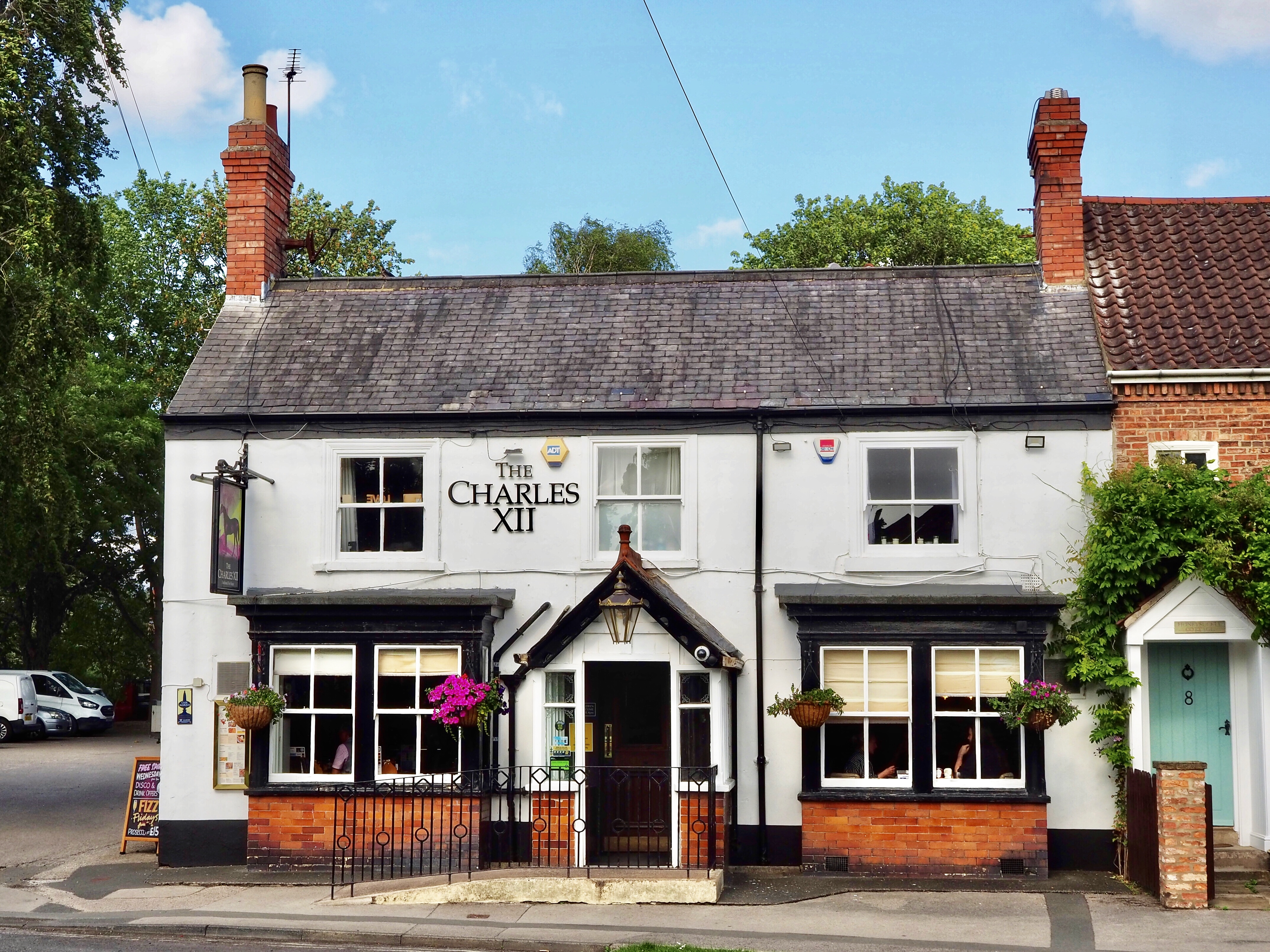
- The pub in 2025
- Former names: The Robin Hood; The Horse; The Chestnut Horse; The Bay Horse
- Alternative names: The Charles

General information
- Type: Public house
- Location: Main Street, Heslington, York, England
- Coordinates: 53°56′43″N 1°02′42″W
- Year built: 18th century
- Owner: Stonegate

The Charles XII, commonly referred to as The Charles, is a pub on Main Street in Heslington, a suburban village within the City of York, England.

== History ==
The Charles was one of three alehouses in Heslington in the 18th century. Its name is recorded as The Robin Hood in 1823, then The Horse in 1828, becoming The Chestnut Horse by 1834 and The Bay Horse by 1840. Around 1843 the pub was renamed The Charles XII, a name that has been retained ever since.

The Charles frequently hosted celebrations for local institutions. In 1844 the Roseland Lodge of the Ancient Order of Free Gardeners marked its first anniversary there, followed by its seventh anniversary in 1852. A celebratory supper was held there after a ploughing match in 1858, and in 1864 the Heslington Mutual Benefit Society hosted a dinner at the pub with Francis Carr, land agent to George John de Yarburgh, as chair. Inquests were also held at the inn when required.

Like the rest of the village, Heslington had no piped water until the 1930s, and the pub was lit by gas rather than electricity. During the Second World War several RAF Bomber Command sites were located around Heslington, and The Charles was often filled with air force personnel. A race involving personnel riding atop a stuffed rhinoceros taken from Heslington Hall was reportedly held between The Charles and The Deramore Arms along what is now Main Street.

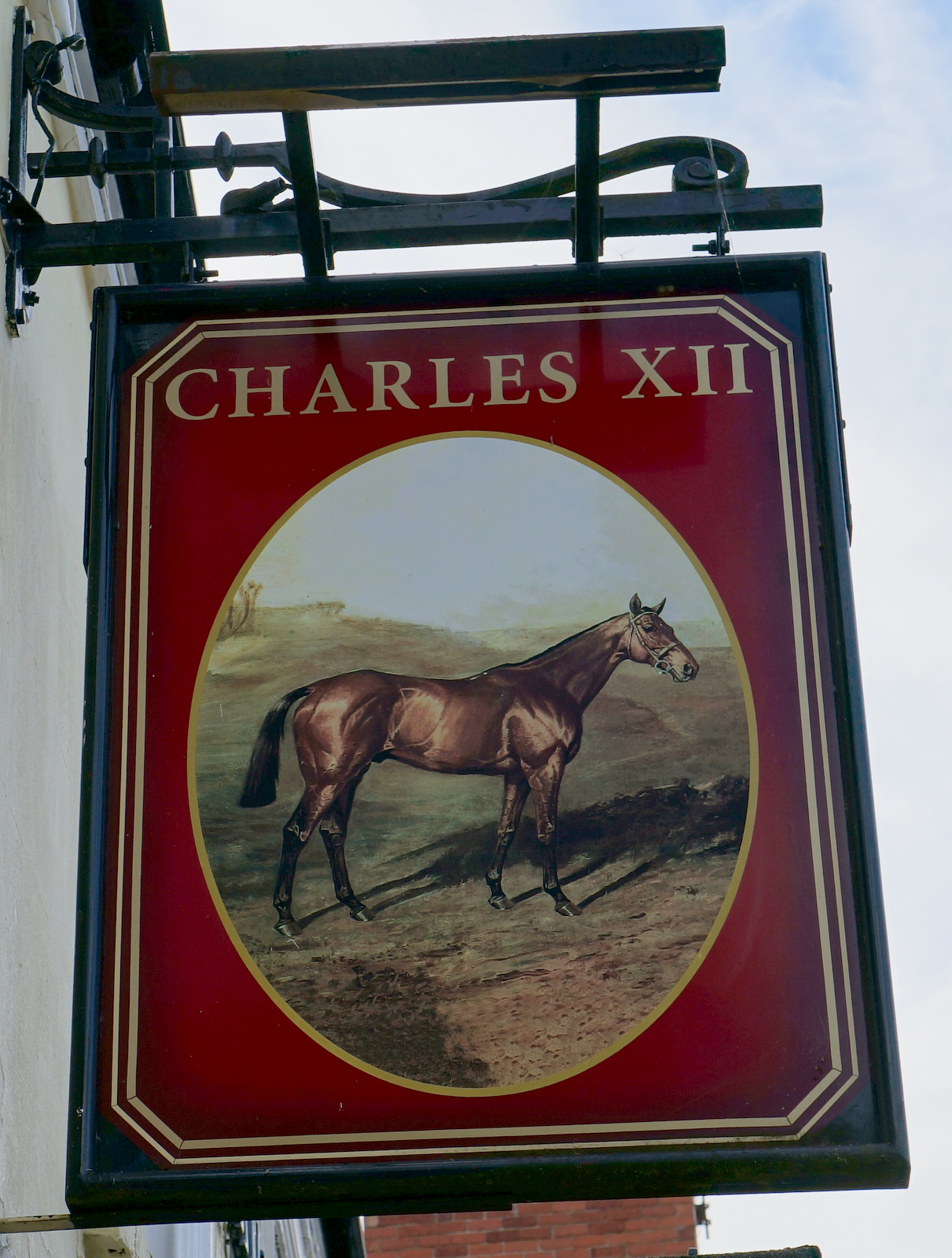
The pub sign in 2014

With the establishment of the University of York nearby, The Charles quickly became popular with students. Students gathered there in 1963 on the eve of the university's opening to celebrate the occasion. The pub sought to attract student custom by offering cheap, mediocre beer, making it very much a "student pub". It also provided a venue where staff could mix informally with students after lectures. However, this contributed to several town-and-gown incidents, with local residents protesting against the presence and behaviour of students.

In 1979 the landlady made the unusual decision to encourage graffiti by placing a chalkboard in the gents' toilets. The board became popular with students and university staff and, contrary to assumptions, was not used for crude doodles. The most provocative remark recorded was "Save the Seals [...] And Cull All The Students".

Joe Simpson, a fast-food seller, used the pub's car park for six years to sell food to students returning from nights out, until Bass Brewery, then the owner, ordered him to stop in 1998 following complaints from local residents. In response, the University of York Student Union (YUSU) voted to lobby the pub and brewer to allow Simpson to return.

A fight between five students outside the pub in 1997 resulted in two requiring hospital treatment.

The Charles was one of several pubs in York to apply for a new licence in 2005 to allow opening until midnight. After a considerable number of complaints from local residents, the parish council rejected the application. A total of 72 individuals lodged objections, primarily concerning noise and disruption caused by students. Bill McClean, honorary secretary of the Heslington Village Trust, stated: "These students are trainee drinkers with no ability or wish to control their inebriation. It's all part of the sport."

In 2016, the pub reopened following investment of around £210,000, which included the construction of an outside bar area and internal renovation.

The pub remains popular with a wide range of students, who view it as an attractive alternative to university and YUSU facilities and entertainment.

As of September 2026, the freehold is owned by the Stonegate Pub Company.

== Origin of name ==
As the pub sign implies, the pub is not named after King Charles XII of Sweden, but a horse. Charles XII was originally a brown colt, bred by Major Nicholas Yarburgh of Heslington Hall. He was among the most successful horses of the era, winning sixteen of his twenty three starts. His most famous race was the Doncaster St Leger Stakes flat race in 1839 where, ridden by Bill Scott, Charles XII finished first in a dead heat with Euclid, ridden by Patrick Conolly. In the deciding heat, Charles XII won 'by a head'. It was in recognition of this victory that the Bay Horse was renamed the Charles XII.
