= Samuel Derham =

English physician

- Born: 1655
- Died: 26 August 1689 (aged 33–34)
- Occupation: Physician

Samuel Derham (1655 – 26 August 1689) was an English physician.

== Biography ==
Derham was born in 1655 at Weston, near Campden, Gloucestershire, being the son of William Derham of that place. He entered as a student of Magdalen Hall, Oxford, in Michaelmas term 1672, when he was seventeen years old. He took the degree of B.A. on 13 June 1676, that of M.A. on 3 May 1679, was made M.B. on 9 Feb. 1681, and passed M.D. on 18 Jan. 1687. He began the practice of medicine before he attained to the last-named honour, and in 1685 distinguished himself by publishing an account of the chalybeate waters at Ilmington in Warwickshire, which he strongly and successfully recommended as a cure for scrofulous complaints. The place became in consequence a fashionable health resort, and Lord Capell, the landowner there, encouraged visitors by presenting the land surrounding the well to the public. Derham seemed on the way to eminence in his profession when he was suddenly cut off, in the prime of his life, by small-pox, dying in his house at Oxford on 26 August 1689. He was buried in his parish church, St. Michael's, at the upper end of the north chancel.

The title of the book he published is: ‘Hydrologia Philosophica; or, an Account of Ilmington Waters in Warwickshire, with directions for drinking of the same,’ 8vo, Oxford, 1685. Annexed to this publication is a treatise entitled ‘Experimental Observations touching the original of Compound Bodies.’
