= Charlie Jeffery =

British academic (born 1964)

Charlie Jeffery CBE FAcSS

Vice Chancellor and President of the University of Southampton
- Incumbent
- Assumed office 1 October 2026
- Preceded by: Phillip Wright (acting)

Personal details
- Education: Loughborough University (BA, MA, PhD)

Academic background
- Thesis: The Social Democratic Movement in Steyr, Austria, 1927–1934 (1989)

Charlie Jeffery CBE FAcSS is the Vice-Chancellor and President of the University of Southampton since October 1 2026. He is the former Vice Chancellor and President of University of York in England.

== Early life ==
Jeffery was educated at Loughborough University with a B.A. and a Ph.D. in European Studies.

== Career ==
From 1999 to 2004, Jeffery was professor of politics at the University of Birmingham. In 2004, he was appointed professor of politics at school of social and political studies, University of Edinburgh. From 2009 to 2012, he became Head of School of social and political studies. In 2012, he was appointed vice principal of public policy and in 2014 as senior vice principal of the University of Edinburgh. In 2019, he joined University of York as vice chancellor and president.. In June 2026, it was announced that Jeffery would be taking up the position of Vice-Chancellor and President of the University of Southampton from 1 October 2026.

== Committees ==
Jeffery was an ESRC impact champion. He was a director of ESRC devolution and constitutional change programme. He was chair of the UK political studies association. He was an advisor to the House of Commons Select Committee on the Office of the Deputy Prime Minister on the Draft English Regional Assemblies Bill and to the Scottish Parliament's Scotland Bill Committee.

== Awards ==
Jeffery was awarded a Commander of the Order of the British Empire (CBE) in 2016 by the Queen for his contributions in promoting social science on public decision making. He is a Fellow of the Academy of Social Sciences.

== Personal life ==
Jeffery resides in Southampton with his wife and three children.
