= Heslington Hall =

Listed building near York, England

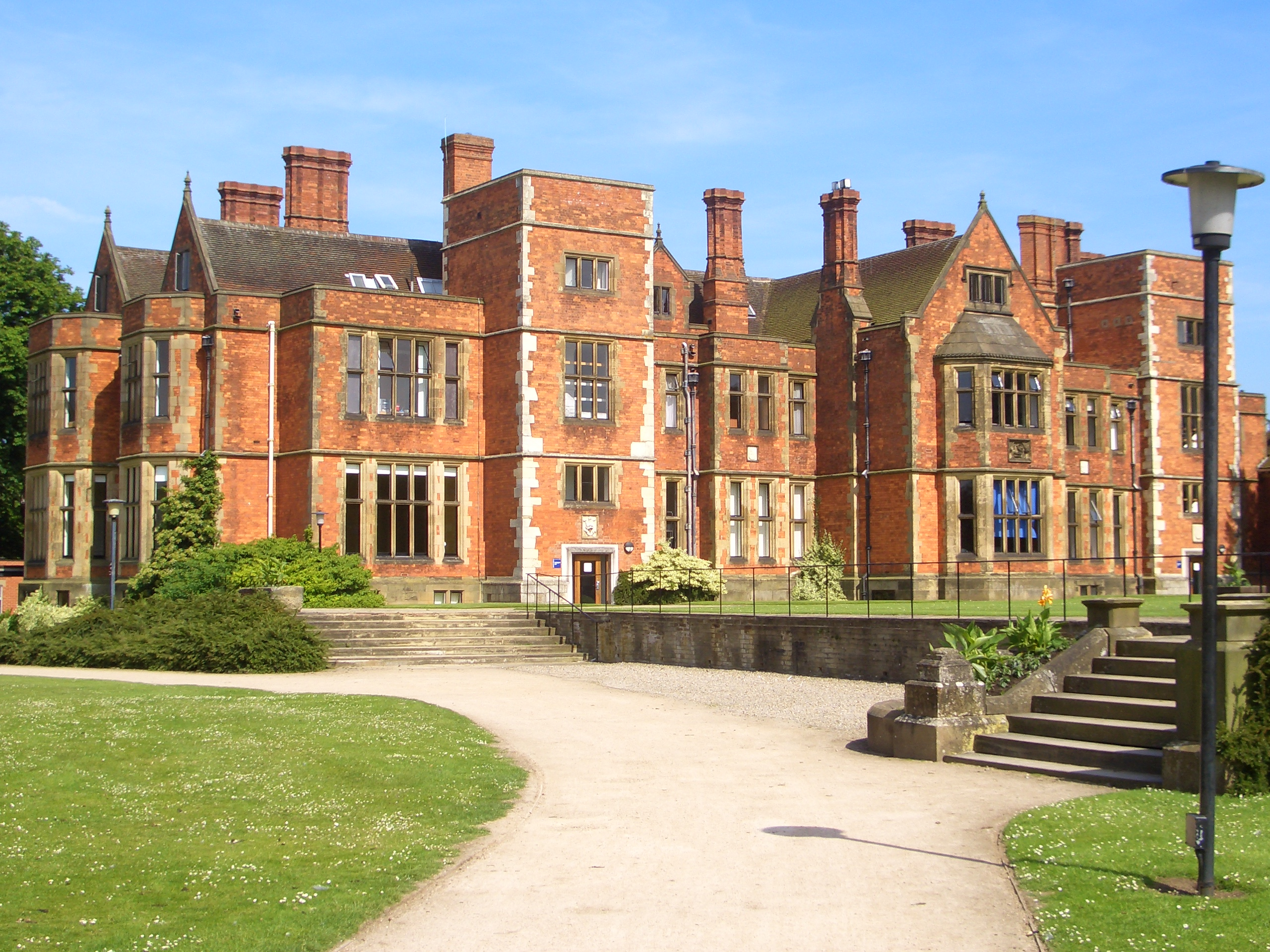
- Interactive map of the Heslington Hall area

General information
- Type: Manor house
- Architectural style: Jacobethan
- Location: Heslington, York, England
- Coordinates: 53°56′45″N 1°2′49″W
- Construction started: 1568
- Renovated: 1854
- Client: Sir Thomas Eynns
- Owner: University of York

Design and construction
- Architects: Philip Charles Hardwick, Walter Brierley
- Designations

Listed Building – Grade II*
- Official name: Heslington Hall
- Designated: 1 November 1955
- Reference no.: 1148497

Heslington Hall is an historic manor house near the village of Heslington, North Yorkshire, England, within the city of York. The hall is part of the campus of the University of York.

The original house dated from 1565 to 1568, but it was largely rebuilt in 1852–4. The present building comprises a central nine-bay, two-storey block with attics and two two-storey wings at each end. It is built of brick in English bond with Magnesian Limestone ashlar dressings.

== History ==
The original manor house was constructed in 1565–8 for Sir Thomas Eynns, the Secretary and Keeper of the Seal to the Council of the North; and his wife Elizabeth. Eynns died in 1573 and the estate was sold in 1601 by his nephews to the Hesketh family. On the death of Thomas Hesketh in 1708, the hall passed by marriage to the Yarburgh family, who lived in it for several generations. In 1719 Henrietta Yarburgh, 26, married playwright Sir John Vanbrugh at St. Lawrence Parish Church (then the parish church of half of Heslington, including the hall). The tombs of several members of the Hesketh and Yarburgh families can be seen in the churchyard of St Lawrence. Major Nicholas Yarburgh, who lived at the hall from 1825 to 1852 and was High Sheriff of Yorkshire in 1836, won the St Leger Stakes in 1839 with his horse Charles the Twelfth – one of the local pubs in Heslington was subsequently named after the horse.

On the death of Nicholas in 1852, ownership passed to his nephew Yarburgh Greame of Sewerby Hall, Bridlington, who adopted the surname Yarburgh and commissioned architect Philip Charles Hardwick in 1854 to rebuild the hall in the Victorian Jacobethan style. Parts of the original manor house which were preserved include two staircase towers, the courtyard and the pendant stucco ceiling of the great hall. The house was inherited on his death in 1856 by his own nephew, George John Lloyd (who then added the name Yarburgh) and in 1875 by George's daughter, Mary Elizabeth Yarburgh. She had married George William Bateson in 1862 and he then assumed in 1876 the additional surname of de Yarburgh by Royal licence. He later became the 2nd Baron Deramore after the death of his brother in 1890. His two sons, Robert Wilfred de Yarburgh-Bateson (3rd Baron Deramore) (1865–1936) and George Nicholas de Yarburgh-Bateson (4th Baron Deramore) (1870–1943), occupied after him.

According to Nikolaus Pevsner's Yorkshire: York and the East Riding (page 463, 1995 edn), most of the interior of the hall now visible is by York architect Walter Brierley, of 1903. At the outbreak of the Second World War, the house was vacated by the family who allowed it to be taken over by the Royal Air Force as the headquarters of No. 4 Group RAF, part of RAF Bomber Command. The hall was not re-occupied by the family after the war. In 1955, the hall was given Grade II* listed building status. When the University of York was founded (it opened to students in 1963), Sir Bernard Feilden supervised its conversion into the administrative headquarters of the university. The hall and university were in that part of the East Riding of Yorkshire now part of the City of York. The conversion of the hall to meet the demands of the university cost £160,000.

In April 2023, reporters from The Tab investigated the current purpose of the hall. Ultimately it appeared that its primary, if not single purpose, was accommodating administrative offices. Since September 2025, the building is being used for teaching and research purposes, primarily by the arts and humanities. It houses, among others, York's Humanities Research Centre, the Centre for Renaissance and Early Modern Studies, and the Centre for Medieval Studies.

== Grounds ==
The current gardens were designed in the 18th century and were remodelled in the 1960s when the estate was incorporated into York University. The gardens take the form of a Dutch Topiary garden with rows of mature Yew trees creating a central avenue.

=== The Quiet Place ===
The Quiet Place consists of an enclosed garden room with a two-storey gazebo in the Georgian style and an orangery. The site was opened in 1999, following renovations as a secluded place for reading, meditation, reflection, and prayer. It is currently used by the university chaplaincy to hold its 'Quiet Prayer' session on Monday mornings.

Other images of Heslington Hall
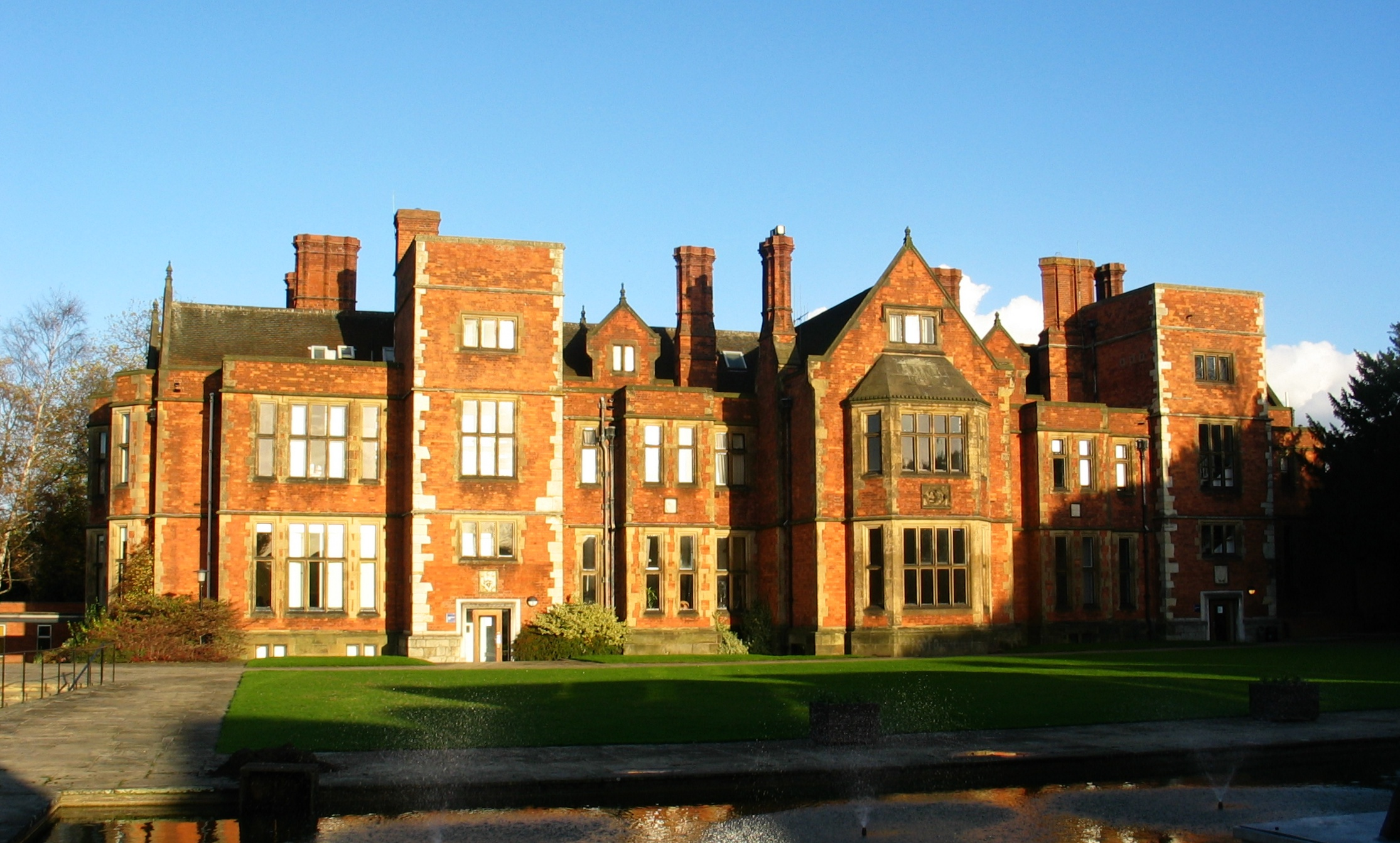
Rear of the hall

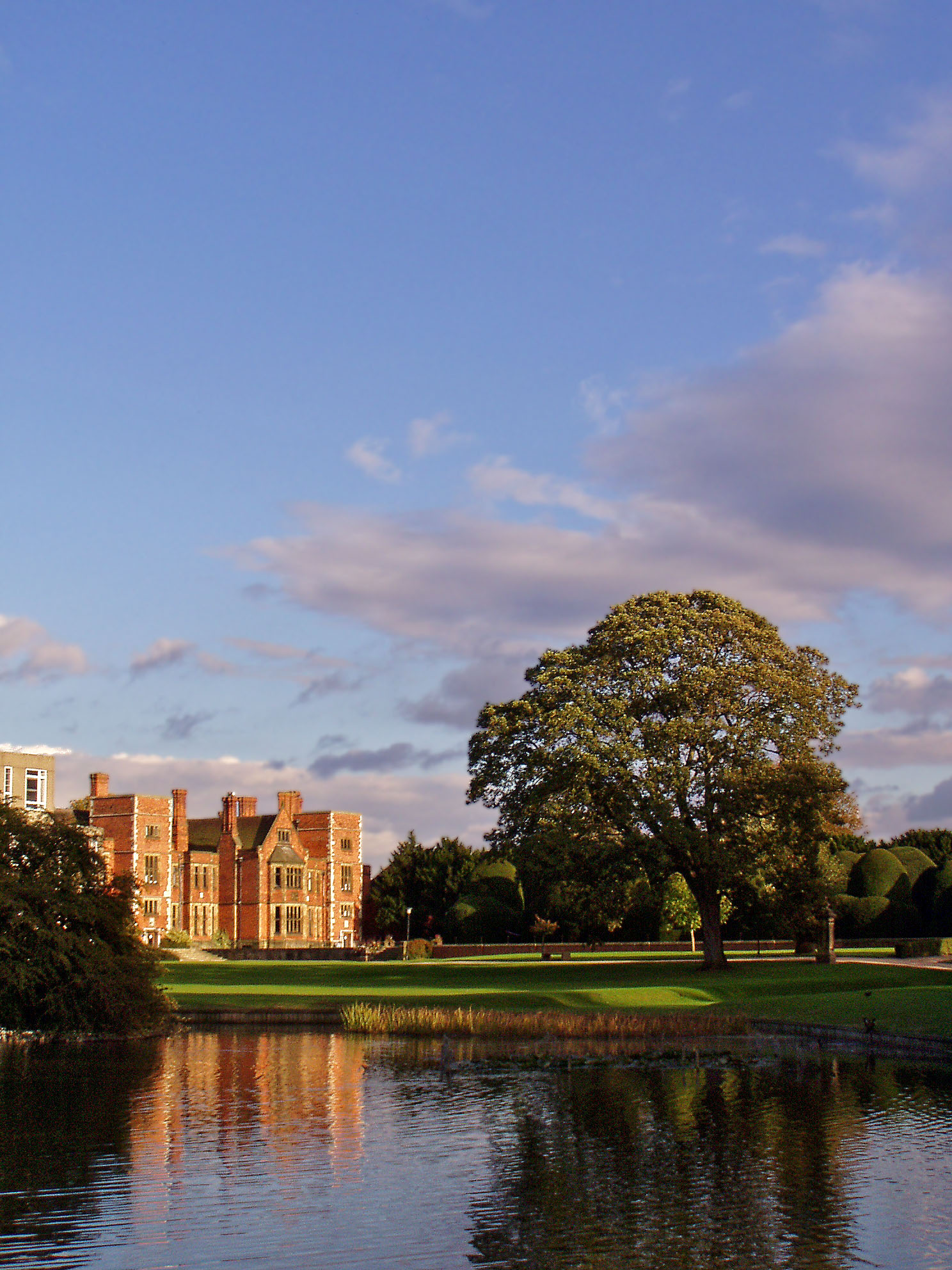
Heslington Hall from a distance

== See also ==
- Grade II* listed buildings in the City of York
