= University and college rivalry =

Ongoing competitiveness between two institutions

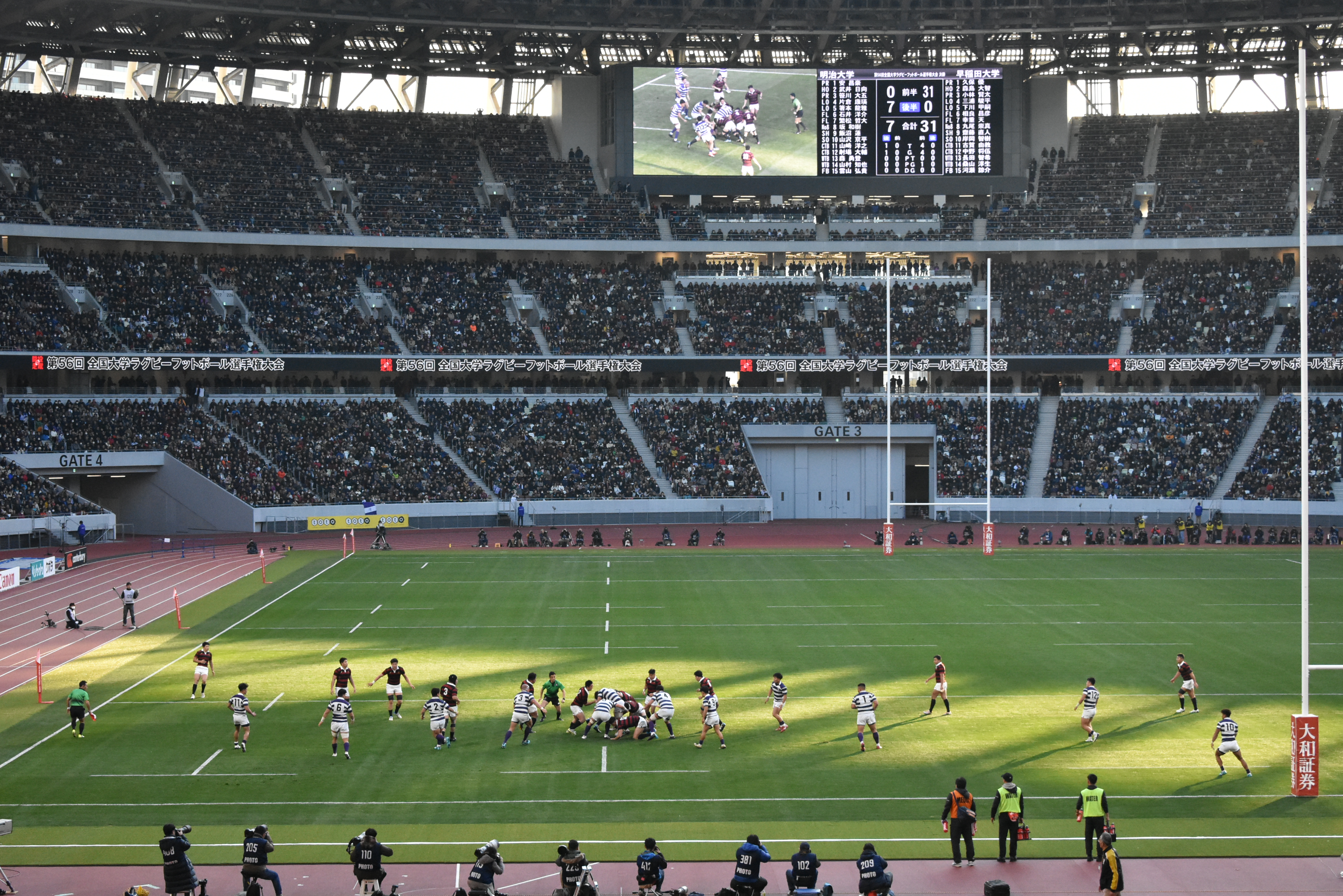
The rugby game classic Meiji University versus Waseda University at 56th All-Japan University Rugby Championship - final (Japan National Stadium)

Pairs of schools, colleges and universities, especially when they are close to each other either geographically or in their areas of specialization, often establish a university or college rivalry with each other over the years. This rivalry, which is frequently synonymous with a sports rivalry, can extend to both academics and athletics, and sometimes even politics, the middle being typically better known to the general public. These schools place an added emphasis on emerging victorious in any event that includes their rival. This may include the creation of a special trophy or other commemoration of the event. While many of these rivalries have arisen spontaneously, some have been created by college officials in efforts to sell more tickets and support their programs.

The oldest modern sporting rivalry between two schools is Eton v Harrow, a cricket match between Eton College and Harrow School that was first held in 1805 at Lord's Cricket Ground, England, and has taken place annually since 1822. The earliest known association football match between two schools was Eton v Harrow in 1834, among several other notable rivalries in English public school football games. The oldest university-level sporting rivalries are between the University of Oxford and University of Cambridge in England: The University Match in cricket, which was first held in 1827, at Lord's; and The Boat Race, which was first contested in 1829 on the River Thames in London. Oxford–Cambridge rivalry influenced college rivalries in the United States and other countries around the world.

== Definition of a sports rivalry ==
Rivalries traverse many different fields within society. A rivalry develops from the product of competition and ritualism between different parties. A rivalry is defined as "a perceptual categorizing process in which actors identify which states are sufficiently threatening competitors". Ritualism is "a series of ... iterated acts or performances that are ... famous in terms 'not entirely encoded by the performer'; that is, they are imbued by meanings external to the performer". Everyone that is part of the sports event in some capacity becomes a part of the ritualism. Teams get together before the game to warm up, coaches shake hands with each other, captains have a determinant of who gets the ball first, everyone stands during the national anthem, the fans sit in specific areas, they make certain gestures with their hands throughout the game, they wear specific gear that is associated with the team, and they have the same post-game practices every game of every season of every year. It is through this consistency of playing the same teams yearly that "these rivalries have shown remarkable staying power". Specifically, it is society's drive to disrupt these original rituals that start rivalries. Horst Helle says, "society needs a particular quantitative relationship of harmony and disharmony, association and competition, favour and disfavour, in order to take shape in a specific way". Society is drawn to this in sports because this is a principal characteristic in everyday life, which can be seen in historic religious rivalries, such as the contemporary example of sectarianism in Glasgow. Within an area, differences between two types of people can drive the start of a rivalry. Competition and support keep the rivalry going.

In sports, competition tests who has better skill and ability at the time of the game through play. Many rivalries persist because the competition is between two teams that have similar abilities. Spectators gravitate towards competitive rivalries because they are interesting to watch and unpredictable. Society follows competitions because competitions influence "the unity of society". Being loyal to one team in a rivalry brings a sense of belonging to a community of supporters that are hoping that the team they are rooting for wins. The fans of the two different teams do not sit next to each other because this disrupts the community. In a similar way, competition displays an indirect way of fighting. Society does not condone direct fighting as a way of getting something so this is the most passive aggressive way of fighting. Because this is an acceptable practice, there are many supporters of competition as they fuel a way for the people to participate in a rivalry without the consequences of fighting. However, when the competition is not enough in sports and the tensions are high fighting does ensue.

== Contributors to rivalry ==
An important contributor to having a rivalry is having intense competitive play between two sports teams within the ritualistic structure of the game. A competition is "a form of struggle fought by means of objective performances, to the advantage of a third [party]", which in sports is driven by the team dynamic, and external outlets such as the fans and the media. These external outlets give rivalries more distinctive importance. An example of a rivalry that embodies this is the Red Sox–Yankees rivalry.

=== The team dynamic ===
In sports such as basketball and football, teamwork is important. This is so because the team is a smaller society that needs to function properly. This means that they need good communication and get necessary goals accomplished for the team. Because of this, the individual on the team is seen as less important than the group as everyone works toward the goal of making the group the best it can possibly be. Players do this "in the form of obedience to authority, group loyalty, and the willingness to sacrifice for the good of the group."

=== The spectators ===
The spectators, also known as fans, of sporting events are the largest population associated with the event. Fans exhibit "intangible feelings of pride, solidarity, and pleasure" for a particular team and brand loyalty, which means that they "heavily identify[y] with a particular team or university and have shown that the self-esteem of these ardent fans can be affected by their team's success in competition". This is important in rivalries because fans can determine the outcome of the game and the overall mood throughout the game. The fans have a lot of power because of this fact and therefore possess indirect power and determination on the outcome of the game.

=== The media ===
The media connect the team, with the fans and the rest of the world. "The media do[es not] 'tell it like it is.' Rather, they tell it in a way that supports the interests of those who benefit from cultural commitments to competition, productivity, and material success." This is known as consumerism because the media influences society's emotions to think of the rivalries in a way that will get people to be as passionate about the game as they want to be. It is spectators' enjoyment of sports and the associated rivalries that drive media sport consumption.

== Americas ==
=== Latin America ===
==== Chile ====
- Universidad de Chile and Universidad Católica de Chile

==== Mexico ====
- Universidad Nacional Autónoma de México and Instituto Politécnico Nacional
- Universidad Autónoma de Nuevo León and Instituto Tecnológico de Estudios Superiores de Monterrey
- Universidad Iberoamericana and Universidad Anahuac
- Universidad Autónoma de Baja California and Instituto Tecnológico de Tijuana

=== North America ===
==== Canada ====
- Carleton University and University of Ottawa

These two schools are cross-city rivals in Ottawa, Ontario and have historically had the largest football rivalry in the country. The Carleton Ravens and the Ottawa Gee-Gees played the annual Panda Game from 1955 to 1998, which consistently garnered a national spotlight and was renowned for its size and popularity. The Panda Game was absent for 15 years after Carleton shut down their football program, but was revived in 2013 when Carleton restarted their football program.

The rivalry is also on display on the basketball court, where both schools' teams are among the best in Canada.

- University of Western Ontario and Queen's University

These two universities have one of the oldest rivalries in Canada. Western, located in London, Ontario and Queen's, located in Kingston, Ontario are two of the older schools in Ontario and are both notable academic institutions. The rivalry is ever present in Football when the two schools meet every year.

- University of Western Ontario and Wilfrid Laurier University
- University of Toronto and York University

Historically, Toronto and York compete at the annual Red & Blue Bowl football match, which attracts alumni and many students from both universities. Other rivalries exist in hockey and rowing, in which both score quite well. Both schools are located in the city of Toronto.

- University of British Columbia and Simon Fraser University

Cross-city rivals located in Vancouver, British Columbia. See Shrum Bowl

- University of Winnipeg and University of Manitoba
- Queen's University and McGill University
- Queen's University and Royal Military College of Canada
- Wilfrid Laurier University and University of Waterloo
- Georgian College and Durham College
- Georgian College and Sheridan College
- Université de Moncton and University of New Brunswick

==== United States ====
School rivalries are important in the United States, especially in intercollegiate sports. Some rivalries, such as the Indiana–Kentucky rivalry, take place between two schools from different conferences.

The Caltech–MIT rivalry is unusual for both the geographic distance between the schools (their campuses are separated by about 2500 miles and are on opposite coasts of the United States) and the focus is on elaborate pranks rather than sporting events.

== Asia ==
=== East Asia ===
==== China ====
- Peking University and Tsinghua University: Known as the Pekhua Rivalry, they are the two best universities in mainland China, and they are located next to each other.
- Shanghai Jiao Tong University and Fudan University: These two Shanghai-based reputable universities frequently participate in a variety of joint sports competitions, including bicycle racing, track and field, soccer, and dragon boat racing.
- Sichuan University and Chongqing University: Chengdu, the home of Sichuan University, and Chongqing, the home of Chongqing University, are rival cities in southwestern China due to historical and geographic reasons, and the relationship between these two cities leads to the rivalry between these two flagship universities of their areas (Similar to Michigan-Ohio State rivalry).
- Zhejiang University and Nanjing University: Two flagships in Yangtze River's delta area.
- Nankai University and Tianjin University: Two best schools in the city of Tianjin.
- Hefei University of Technology and University of Science and Technology of China: Rivals for historical reasons.
- Sichuan International Studies University and Southwest University of Political Science & Law
- Huazhong University of Science and Technology and Wuhan University
- South China University of Technology and Sun Yat-Sen University
- Nanjing University and Southeast University
- Renmin University and Peking University

===== Hong Kong =====
====== University ======
- The Chinese University of Hong Kong, and The University of Hong Kong
- Hong Kong University of Science and Technology, City University of Hong Kong, and Hong Kong Polytechnic University

====== Schools ======
- Diocesan Boys' School and La Salle College (La Salle-Diocesan Rivalry), the two dominating boys' schools in Hong Kong, have a rivalry in sporting championship in Bauhinia Bowl, also in music and academics in other Inter-School Competitions.
- Wah Yan College, Hong Kong and Wah Yan College, Kowloon
- St. Joseph's College and Wah Yan College, Hong Kong
- Diocesan Girls' School and Heep Yunn School

==== Japan ====
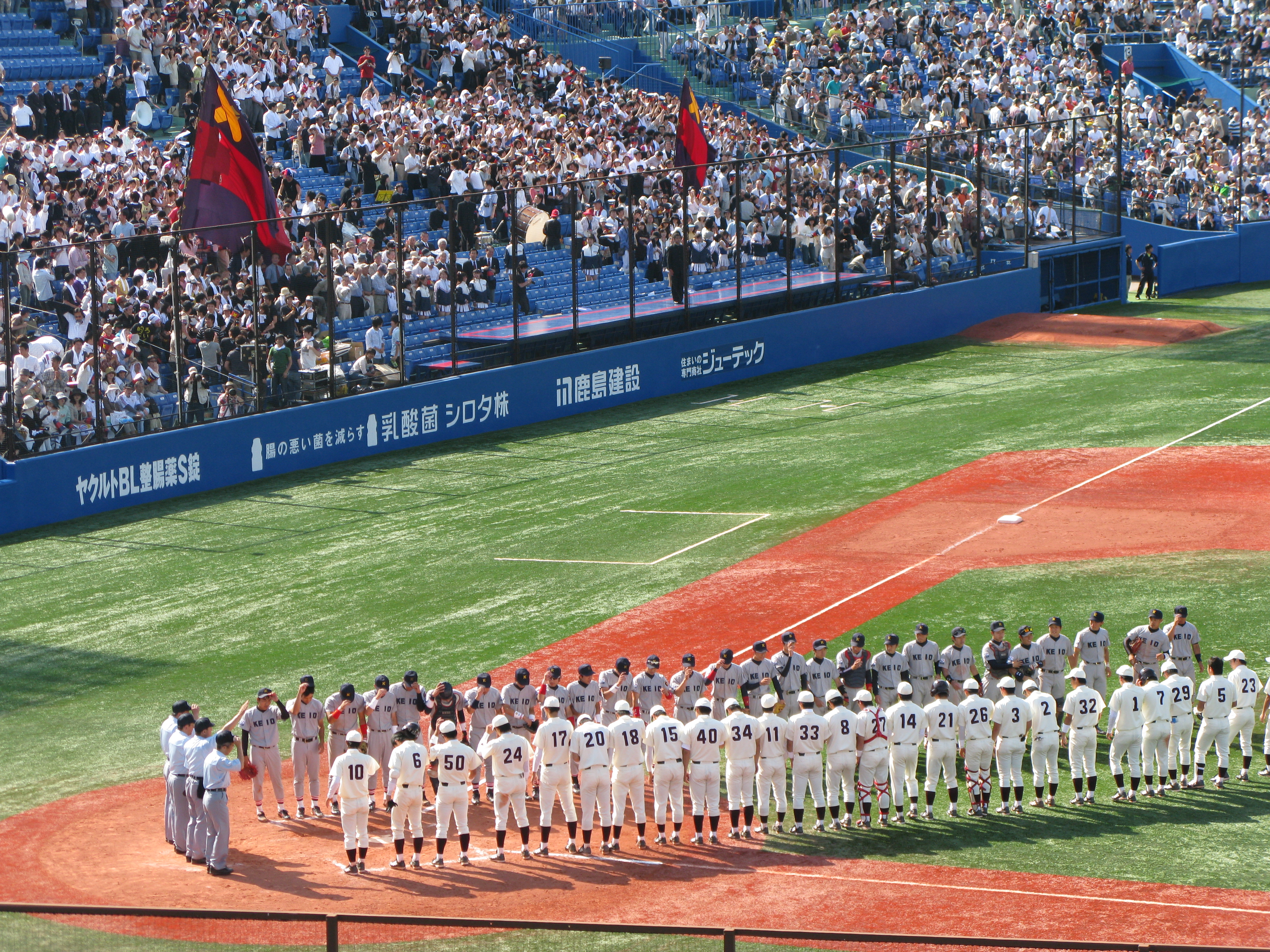
Soukeisen(Japan)

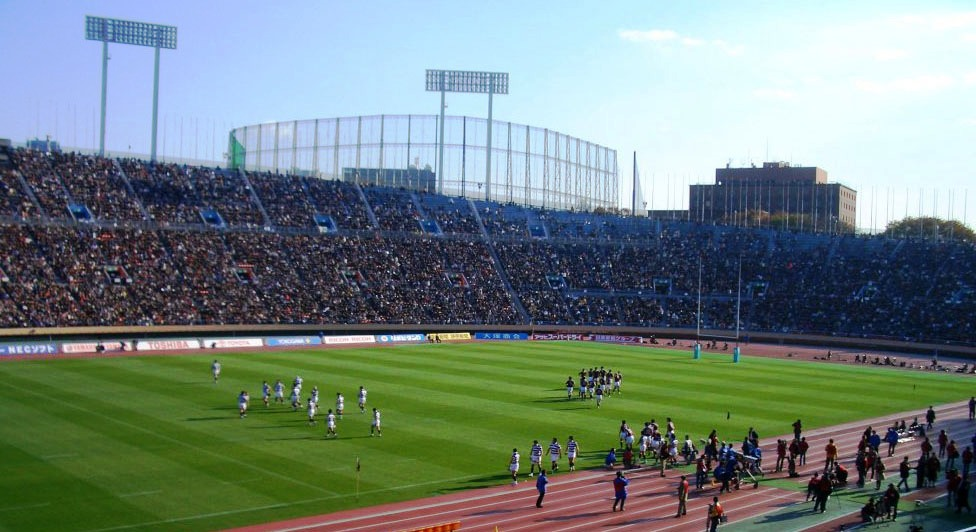
Soumeisen(Japan)

- Kyoto University and The University of Tokyo – dating back to 1869, the oldest in Japan; primarily an academic rivalry since the 1950s.
- Keio University and Waseda University – known as Soukeisen, an athletic rivalry in baseball, rugby, football (soccer) and rowing.
- Meiji University and Waseda University – known as Soumeisen, baseball and rugby football rivalry.
- Meiji University and Keio University – known as Keimeisen, baseball and rugby football rivalry.
- Kansai University and Kwansei Gakuin University – known as Kankansen, baseball and rugby football rivalry.
- Ritsumeikan University and Doshisha University – known as Doritsusen, baseball and rugby football rivalry.
- Nanzan University and Sophia University – known as Jōnan-sen.
- Fukuoka University and Seinan Gakuin University – known as Seifukusen, baseball rivalry.

==== South Korea ====
- Yonsei University and Korea University (see Yonsei–Korea (Korea-Yonsei) rivalry)
- KAIST and POSTECH

==== Taiwan ====
- National Chiao Tung University and National Tsing Hua University, Mei-Chu Tournament
- National Chung Cheng University, National Chung Hsing University, National Cheng Kung University and National Sun Yat-sen University
- National Taiwan University and National Chengchi University

=== Southeast Asia ===
==== Indonesia ====
- University of Indonesia and Gadjah Mada University

==== Malaysia ====
- Malay College Kuala Kangsar with Sekolah Tuanku Abdul Rahman

==== Philippines ====
===== University Athletic Association of the Philippines =====
- Ateneo de Manila University and De La Salle University (Ateneo–La Salle rivalry)
  – UAAP Men's Basketball, started in NCAA Men's Basketball, but developed in the UAAP.
- Far Eastern University and University of the East (The Battle of the East)
  – UAAP Men's Basketball
- De La Salle University and University of Santo Tomas (La Salle–UST rivalry)
  – UAAP Women's Volleyball, UAAP Men's Basketball, UAAP Men's and Women's Tennis
- University of the Philippines and Ateneo de Manila University (Battle of Katipunan)
- University of the Philippines and University of Santo Tomas (UP–UST rivalry)

===== National Collegiate Athletic Association (Philippines) =====
- Current rivalries
  - San Beda University and Colegio de San Juan de Letran (San Beda–Letran rivalry)
    – NCAA Men's Basketball
  - Colegio de San Juan de Letran and Mapúa University (The "new" Battle of Intramuros)
    – NCAA Men's Basketball
    – NCAA Cheerdance Competition
  - San Sebastian College – Recoletos and Colegio de San Juan de Letran (San Sebastian–Letran rivalry)
    – NCAA Men's Basketball
  - San Sebastian College – Recoletos and José Rizal University
    NCAA Men's Basketball
  - De La Salle–College of Saint Benilde and San Beda University
    – NCAA Soccer
  - San Sebastian College – Recoletos and San Beda University
    – NCAA Men's Basketball
  - University of Perpetual Help System DALTA and San Beda University
    – NCAA Men's Basketball
- Past rivalries
  - Ateneo de Manila University and San Beda University
    – previously in NCAA Men's Basketball.
  - Ateneo de Manila and University of the Philippines Manila (The "old" Battle of Intramuros)
    – previously in NCAA Men's Basketball
  - Colegio de San Juan de Letran and De La Salle University
    – previously NCAA Men's Basketball
  - Mapúa University and 'San Beda University
    – NCAA Juniors Basketball

===== Other leagues =====
- AMA Computer University and STI Colleges, NAASCU's cyber war.

==== Thailand ====
- Chulalongkorn University and Thammasat University, Chula–Thammasat Traditional Football Match
- Assumption College, Bangkok Christian College, Debsirin School and Suankularb Wittayalai School, Jaturamitr Samakkee Football Cup

=== South Asia ===
==== India ====
- Jawaharlal Nehru University, and Delhi University (Leading University rivalry in India)
- Aligarh Muslim University, and Banaras Hindu University
- IIT Bombay, IIT Madras, and IIT Delhi(Leading Technical Universities in India)
- IIT Madras, and IISc Bangalore (Leading Technical cum Research Institutes of India)
- IIT Kharagpur, and IIT Kanpur (Leading Innovative Institutes in India)
- NIT Durgapur, and IIEST Shibpur (The only rivalry between an NIT and an IIEST)
- Jadavpur University, and IIEST Shibpur (Regional rivalry on the basis of Engineering and Politics)
- IIT Kharagpur, and Jadavpur University(Regional rivalry on the basis of Engineering and Innovation)
- Jadavpur University, Calcutta University, and Burdwan University (The Bengal Universities Rivalry Triangle)
- Visva Bharati University, and Rabindra Bharati University
- Loyola College and Pachaiyappas College, Chennai
- IIM Ahmedabad, and IIM Bangalore
- IIM Calcutta, and XLRI Jamshedpur
- St. Stephen's College, Delhi, and Hindu College, Delhi
- IIM Bangalore, and IIM Kozhikode
- SASTRA University, Thanjavur and NIT Trichy, Trichy
- National Law School of India University, Bangalore, and NALSAR University of Law, Hyderabad.
- OP Jindal Global University, Sonepat and Ashoka University, Sonepat
- Christ (Deemed to be University) and St Joseph's College, Bangalore

==== Sri Lanka ====
- Royal College, Colombo and S. Thomas' College, Mount Lavinia, the Royal–Thomian annual cricket match since 1879.
  - See main article at Royal–Thomian rivalry
- Dharmaraja College, Kandy and Kingswood College, Kandy, the annual cricket encounter Battle of the Maroons since 1893
- Royal College, Colombo and Trinity College, Kandy for the annual Bradby Shield Encounter since 1920

== Europe ==
=== Eastern Europe ===
==== Greece ====
- University of Macedonia and Aristotle University of Thessaloniki in Thessaloniki.

==== Turkey ====
- Middle East Technical University and Boğaziçi University
- Faculty of Law and Faculty of Political Sciences of Ankara University

-The two faculties are situated side by side. When İnek Bayramı (literal meaning, The Cow Festival, idiomatic meaning: The Nerd festival), the traditional festival of the Faculty of Political Sciences is being celebrated, the booing from the Faculty of Law is also a long tradition.

=== Western Europe ===
==== Belgium ====
- Université catholique de Louvain and Université Libre de Bruxelles.
- Katholieke Universiteit Leuven and Vrije Universiteit Brussel.

Rivalry started in the 1830s when the Free University of Brussels was established as a non-religious and freethinking university whereas the old Catholic University of Leuven – refounded in 1835 – remained under Church control. The rivalry survived the division of the two original foundations into separate Dutch-speaking and French-speaking establishments, in 1968 and 1970 respectively. Nowadays control of the Church over the two catholic universities has diminished and they are largely pluralist, accepting students and professors from all religions and backgrounds, but the rivalry with the two secular universities in Brussels continues. This rivalry finds expression mainly among academics and traditional student activities as intercollegiate sports remain largely developed in Belgium.

==== France ====
High schools & Preparatory classes: Lycée Louis-le-Grand and Lycée Henri IV in Paris, which are commonly seen as the most prestigious public high schools.

Business Schools: ESSEC Business School and HEC Paris have been fierce rivals with HEC topping most rankings and ESSEC often coming second. However, ESSEC has long been considered an entrepreneurial powerhouse, more dynamic and open-minded than HEC, whilst the latter has constantly been accused of snobbish attitudes due to the elitist mindset of its student population. Whether either assumptions are true or false, those two schools have produced the elite of French business circles, alongside the other "Parisian" business school ESCP Europe, which is usually ranked third in France.

Engineering Schools: The famous engineering schools, such as ParisTech members, usually compete in national sports tournaments, but also in technological competitions such as the French Robotics Cup or the Mash Marathon. In these situations some of the schools chose to form alliances, like Supélec and Arts et Métiers ParisTech that build common robots.

Other Schools: The "Critérium" of the Institut d'études politiques (IEP) is an annual multi-sport competition between the 9 IEPs. It is traditionally held on the last weekend of March with the host city changing every year. It is the occasion for the IEPs located in French regions to challenge the more prestigious IEP Paris (known as "Sciences Po"). A final opposing Paris to, for example, Lyon would see students from all over France cheering for Lyon, especially with the anthem "Province unie, tous contre Paris !" ("Province united, all against Paris !", the "province" being a somewhat pejorative term used to designate any place in France outside of Paris). The Paris students would respond by boasting their status as a Grande école and élite institution.

==== Ireland ====
- University College Dublin and Trinity College Dublin
  - See The Colours Match

==== Italy ====
- University of Pisa and University of Pavia – the annual Pisa-Pavia Regatta, the second oldest in Europe after the Oxford Cambridge boat race.
- Scuola Normale Superiore and Sant'Anna School of Advanced Studies, Pisa
- Ghislieri College and Borromeo College, Pavia

==== United Kingdom ====
===== Universities =====
Oxford and Cambridge universities (Oxbridge) have a rivalry which dates back to the 13th century. The two universities award Blues for participation in varsity matches in major sports including the University Match (since 1927), the Boat Race (since 1829 for men and 1927 for women), The Varsity Match in rugby union (since 1872), the University Golf Match (since 1878), The Varsity Polo Match (1878), the Ice Hockey Varsity Match (1885), the University Hockey Match (since 1890 for men and 1898 for women), The Varsity Game (since 1921), the skiing Varsity Trip (since 1922), the Rugby League Varsity Match (since 1981), and The Varsity Yacht Race (since 2003).

Colleges within each university are also known to nurture keen rivalries, such as that between Oriel College, Oxford and Pembroke College, Oxford, centred on rowing; that between Exeter College, Oxford and Jesus College, Oxford, which are directly opposite each other on Turl Street; or that between Brasenose College, Oxford and Lincoln College, Oxford, one of two pairs of "semi-detached" colleges in Oxbridge – the other being Balliol College and Trinity College in Broad Street, Oxford. Another keen rivalry is that between St Edmund Hall, and the Queen's College, Oxford, dating back to the time when the Queen's College owned St Edmund Hall. In Cambridge, rivalries exist between St John's and Trinity, two of the richest colleges of the university and all of Oxbridge. Rivalries have also been established between colleges in Oxford and Cambridge, such as that between Robinson College, Cambridge and St Catherine's College, Oxford.

University College London and King's College London have a rivalry that has been a part of London life for nearly two centuries. It can be traced to their foundation in the 1820s when King's College was established as an Anglican alternative to the secular University College. The third-oldest university in England debate between the two universities and other parties continues to this day.

King's College London and University of Bradford also have a departmental rivalry. King's College London's War Studies department faces Bradford University's Peace Studies department, in an annual football match for the 'Tolstoy Cup'. The rivalry between 'War' and 'Peace' studies teams is one of the great sporting rivalries, being featured at number four on the Financial Times list of "Great College Sports Rivalries".

Lancaster University and University of York have a rivalry which has lasted since the formation of the universities at similar times in the 1960s. There is an annual sports competition between the university named the Roses Tournament. The name derives from the War of the Roses, and English civil war fought in the 15th century between the House of York and the House of Lancaster. The first event was held in 1965 and has been an annual tradition ever since.

Northumbria University and Newcastle University, both in Newcastle upon Tyne, have a rivalry based upon the extreme geographical proximity between them. In 1994 the Stan Calvert Cup was instituted as a multi-sport competition between the two universities; but in 2018 Newcastle University decided to withdraw from the cup for the foreseeable future.

University of Liverpool and Liverpool John Moores University have a rivalry: they are the city's two principal universities; there is a battle for the "Varsity Cup" every year when over 1,000 students from both universities compete in over 15 different sports.

University of Essex and University of East Anglia have an annual competition known amongst the students as "Derby Day", as well as competing academically.

===== Schools =====
- Eton v Harrow, an annual cricket match between Eton College and Harrow School that has been held at Lord's Cricket Ground since 1805. The earliest known football match between the two schools was held in 1834; among many other rivalries arising from early English public school football games.
- Edinburgh Academy and Merchiston Castle School Since 1858 the oldest continuous rugby fixture in the world. As of 2008 Edinburgh Academy has produced 103 rugby internationalists and Merchiston 62. They compete annually for the Sesquicentenary Trophy.
- Merchant Taylors' School and Haberdashers' Aske's Boys' School, both in south Hertfordshire: annual sports fixtures played, with cricket matches played at Lord's.
- The Perse School and The Leys School Annual matches in all sports. Until The Perse moved site in 1960 the two schools were situated about 500 metres apart, joined by Lensfield Road.
- Lancaster Royal Grammar School and Kirkham Grammar School, the two dominating rugby grammar schools in North Lancashire, although Kirkham has since become independent.
- Royal Grammar School Worcester and King's School, Worcester in the "Modus Cup".
- Westminster School and St. Paul's School
- City of London School and St Paul's School
- Bablake School and King Henry VIII School, Coventry as sister schools have annual sporting competitions which culminate in the annual rugby match played at Butts Park.
- Maidstone Grammar School for Girls and Invicta Grammar School, Maidstone
- St. Paul's School and King's College School, primarily in rugby but also in other sports including football (soccer) and cricket.
- King's College School and Royal Grammar School, Guildford, primarily in rugby where they compete for the Hillers-Hutchison Shield.
- The King's School, Canterbury and King's College School, one of the oldest fixtures in each school's fixture list.
- Tonbridge School and Wellington College, more prominently in rugby, the rugby season finishes with the annual fixture between the two schools.
- Ravensbourne School, Bromley, Bishop Justus Church of England School and Ravens Wood School
- The Skinners' School and The Judd School, both founded by the Honorable Skinners' Company, rivalry in rugby and academia
- George Heriot's School and George Watsons College, rivalry between schools extends back to the 1700s due to the schools being on opposite sides of Lauriston Road from each other. The rivalry was at a high during the mid 1800s with parties from both schools conducting raids on each other and a wave of "thefts, violence, mass riots and bullying". This violence and rivalry subsided with the relocating from Watson's and the change to both School becoming day schools rather than boarding. Today the rivalry extends only to the sports pitch although there is rumour of a raid in the 1970/80s of a group of Watsonian finding themselves in the Heriots cafeteria with several stink bombs.
- Epsom College and St John's School, Leatherhead, have a rivalry in sports, especially rugby and hockey.

== Oceania ==
=== Australia ===
- Prince Alfred College and Saint Peter's College

Each sport has an annual intercollegiate showdown between the two prestigious schools, known as the "Intercol". These are considered by the two colleges to be the most important games of the season, and the fiercely fought matches draw big crowds of students and old scholars from both schools. The Intercols have been played for over 100 years. The Cricket Intercollegiate match has been competed in since 1878. According to Richard Sproull this is "the oldest unbroken annual contest in the history of cricket" (Weekend Australian 5/6 December 1992). For the sport of rowing, the Intercol is competed during South Australia's 'Head of the River Regatta', on the second to last Saturday of the first school term, with one of the two school's taking out the statewide title nearly every year since its beginning.

- Nudgee College and Gregory Terrace

In 1991, the following legend was printed in the Centennial Rugby Programme, dubbed – "The Battle of The Colours", for the 100th anniversary of the annual Nudgee vs Terrace rugby match. The legend has it that the two St Joseph's, who both wore the Christian Brothers traditional blue and white, played off in a Rugby game to decide who would keep the prestigious colours. As the story goes, Nudgee won the match and kept the colours, with Gregory Terrace changing to the now famed red and black. This fierce rivalry has continued ever since in every sport, yet Rugby continues to stand head and shoulders above the rest, with crowds of up to 10 000 attending First XV fixtures. As two of the biggest Rugby schools in Australia the schools also compete for the St Joseph's Cup.

- Jane Franklin Hall, John Fisher College and Christ College

Intercollege Sport has been played between Jane Franklin Hall, Christ College and St. John Fisher College for many years, with many sports played, most importantly Rugby, Cricket and Australian Rules football. These matches are fiercely contested, indeed playing a part in the winning Rugby side is considered the crowning achievement in ones time at college. Jane Franklin Hall has had the edge in sporting prowess over the years in most sports – with its winning streak in Soccer extending back to the mid 1980s, for example – apart from Rugby which is very tightly contested, with Christ College coming out the victor more often over recent years. Each year, the colleges compete for the Intercollege Cup, which is decided based on points earned from sporting results. Each sport is allocated various points for first, second and third, and weighted to reward the college that wins the more prestigious sports of Rugby, Football and Cricket, with Rugby given the highest weighting.

== See also ==
- List of NCAA college football rivalry games
- Sports rivalry
- University and college sport
