= Varsity team =

Sports team

A varsity team is the highest-level team in a sport or activity representing an educational institution. Varsity teams train to compete against each other during an athletic season or in periodic matches against rival institutions. At high schools in the United States, a varsity team is one step above a school's junior varsity (JV) team, which is composed of less experienced players.

The term varsity originated in Britain in the 1840s and means university; varsity team referring to the principal team that would represent the university in matches against another university. In contrast, student-run college teams within a university typically compete against each other in intramural events and, in the U.S., club sports.

== United Kingdom ==
In the United Kingdom, varsity teams compete in varsity matches against rival universities. The term dates from the 1840s, and originally referred to teams from the University of Oxford and University of Cambridge competing in the University Match in cricket that was held in 1827, 1829, 1836 and then annually from 1838. The Boat Race was first contested in 1829, and Inter-'Varsity Sports, also called the Cambridge and Oxford Athletic Games, were held from 1864. The two universities are sometimes referred to as Oxbridge, and the Oxford–Cambridge rivalry in sporting varsity matches spread to other universities in the United Kingdom, the United States and other countries around the world.

Some modern varsity matches in the UK are competitions between multiple universities or involving multiple sports. Examples of varsity competitions include the Roses Tournament between Lancaster University and the University of York, frequently referred to as the largest varsity competition in Europe. The Christie Cup between the universities of Leeds, Liverpool and Manchester in numerous sports has been held since 1886. The Scottish Varsity match in rugby union between the University of St Andrews and the University of Edinburgh, dating to the 1860s, is the oldest varsity match in the world in a code of football. (Note: The Oxford-Cambridge varsity matches in rugby union and association football were first held in 1872 and 1874 respectively although intercollegiate matches in association football date back earlier. The 1869 Princeton vs. Rutgers football game was the first intercollegiate football (soccer) game in the United States while the first intercollegiate rugby football game in the United States took place in 1874 when Harvard University played against McGill University.) The Scottish Boat Race between the University of Glasgow and the University of Edinburgh was first held in 1877.

Most inter-university sport in Britain is now governed and organized by British Universities and Colleges Sport.

== North America ==
In the United States and Canada, varsity teams are the principal athletic teams representing a university, college, technical school, high school, junior high school, or middle school. Such teams compete against similar teams at corresponding educational institutions. Groups of varsity sports teams are often organized into athletic conferences, which are groups of teams that regularly play each other during a given athletic season. In recognition of their high level of performance, athletes on varsity teams are often given varsity letters. They are in contrast to the institution's club sports.

A major difference between varsity and club sports is the source for allocated funds. Varsity teams receive financial support, equipment, and facilities from college and university athletic department budgets. Universities often allocate club sport budgets through student life departments similar to other clubs on campus. Because club sports cost more than other clubs, many club student athletes must pay-to-play and also engage in team fundraising efforts to pay for facilities time, equipment, and other team expenses. At various levels of collegiate sports, varsity student athletes are eligible for scholarships solely or partially based on athletic skills.

Varsity can be compared with the junior varsity (JV) and freshman levels, the former which is typically for less-experienced underclassmen, while the latter is exclusively for first-year students (ninth graders in high school). For many years, National Collegiate Athletic Association (NCAA) rules prohibited college freshmen from playing on varsity teams. Currently, JV and freshman players may be promoted to the varsity level by performing well. In contrast, intramural sports (IM sports), consists of teams within the same school (the word intramural means "within the walls") and IM players rarely move to inter-collegiate teams.

=== Junior varsity ===
In the United States, junior varsity (often called "JV") players are the members of a team who are not the main players in a competition, usually at the high school level and formerly at the collegiate level. The main players comprise the varsity team. Although the intensity of the JV team may vary from place to place, most junior varsity teams consist of players who are in their freshman and sophomore years in school, though occasionally upperclassmen may play on JV teams. For this reason, junior varsity teams are also often called freshman/sophomore teams. Skilled freshmen and sophomores may compete at the varsity level.

==== Junior varsity players ====
Members of a junior varsity team are underclassmen determined by the coaching staff to have less experience or ability than those on the varsity roster. As such, junior varsity teams are used to prepare these athletes to compete at the varsity level. In other schools, the line between JV and varsity is arbitrary, with all players at a certain grade level at varsity and all others below that grade level at JV.

Some teams require participation on a junior varsity team before being eligible to try out for a varsity team. These players can provide the varsity team with extra depth, with their service as back-up players. The NCAA previously prohibited true freshmen from playing varsity college football and basketball; as a result, numerous junior-varsity "freshmen teams" appeared on many major college campuses. The NCAA repealed this limitation in 1972; to the extent that junior varsity teams exist at the college level, many are classified as club squads.

Many sports teams have assistant coaches responsible for developing the talent of junior varsity players.

==== When they play ====
A coach may call on junior varsity players during a varsity game, such as when a varsity player is unable to play.

A team will have many talented players, but the coach is unable to come up with a rotation that allows everyone to play. The decision of when to play junior varsity players in a one-sided game is often at the coach's discretion. This depends on the coach's strategy, the time remaining in the game, the point margin, and the game situation.

When the winning team is ahead by a substantial margin late in the game, the coaches of both the winning and losing teams may "empty their benches"—that is, they remove the varsity players and play the junior varsity players for the remainder of the game. The junior varsity players can impress coaches during this "garbage time" in hopes of gaining more playing time in subsequent games, while at the same time reducing the risk of serious injury by varsity players by resting them in a game whose outcome has been effectively decided.

Some games have rules which allow unlimited use of junior varsity players, such as basketball. Other sports have different ways of determining junior varsity participants. For instance, in high school wrestling, there can only be one wrestler competing for a team at a particular weight class in a given varsity match. The team's representative is often determined by a "challenge match," in which the top two wrestlers at that weight compete for the right to participate in the varsity match. The loser wrestles that night's junior varsity match.

A similar format is used for golf, tennis, and badminton, with players who lose to varsity opponents participating in the junior varsity part of the meet.

==== Junior varsity games ====
Junior varsity games are specially-scheduled events in which junior varsity players play to gain skills and experience. These games may be played immediately before a varsity contest or another night. Records and statistics are kept for the junior varsity team, and some leagues offer a junior varsity championship. An assistant coach acts as the head coach for these games.

In states that use ratings systems to determine playoff participation, junior varsity games do not factor in and are played with considerably less hoopla than varsity games. Attendance is far less, and bands, cheerleaders, and media coverage are usually not present.

In some sports, such as tennis and golf, a junior varsity meet will take place simultaneously with the varsity event; however, the scores are separately tabulated. In track and field, a junior varsity heat of a particular event may take place either before or after the varsity heat.

An underclassman who plays on a junior varsity team one year is expected to gain enough experience to be one of the varsity players the next season. A team's head coach will attend junior varsity games to evaluate skill and decide if a player is ready to play in the main part of a varsity game.

Junior varsity teams may or may not travel with or take the field/court with the varsity team, or in particularly well-organized hierarchies (especially in sports such as football) may alternate home and away schedules with the varsity squad to ensure at least one of the two teams plays at home each week. This is often dependent on the size of the varsity team, availability of transportation and policies invoked by either the coach, school or league. A JV can sometimes completely replace a varsity team in a game with little to no importance; the Missouri Turkey Day Game, for example, has a provision that if either of the two regular opponents is still in the midst of their playoff tournament by the time the game is held, the JV teams will instead play the game.

== Other countries ==
=== Ireland ===
Universities in Ireland have held varsity matches with rival universities since the middle of the 20th century.

=== Netherlands ===
In the Netherlands, the Varsity is the oldest and most prestigious rowing race. It was held for the first time in 1878, and was started as a Dutch equivalent for the Boat Race between Oxford and Cambridge.

== See also ==
- Blue (university sport)
- Letterman (sports)
- Sporting colours
- University and college sport
- Varsity letter
