= University and college sport =

Collegiate and university-level competitive sports

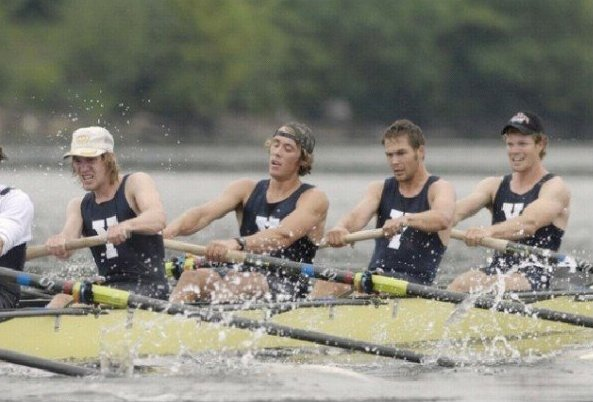
Yale rowing team in the annual Harvard–Yale Regatta, 2007

University and college sport encompasses amateur sports played by non-professional, collegiate and university-level student athletes in competitive sports and games.

University sport traces its roots back to the early 19th century. Originating from public schools in Britain, varsity matches between Oxford University and Cambridge University spread to Harvard University and Yale University, which influenced the development of college athletics in the United States, and spread further to university sport in Commonwealth, European, and other countries, such as Japan. Many university and college rivalries have arisen as a result and college sport has become a major enterprise in the United States.

The international governing body is the International University Sports Federation (FISU), which organizes the FISU World University Games.

== World University Games ==
The origins of university sports competitions date back to 19th century Britain. Beginning in the early 20th-century, student organisations in Europe began arranging national and then international athletic events for university students, distinct from the broader Olympic movement. This eventually led to the creation of the International University Sports Federation (FISU) in 1949 and the establishment of the Universiade in 1959, now known as the FISU World University Games, which continues to serve as the principal global championships for student athletes in the 21st century.

== Evolution of women's participation ==
The inclusion of women in formal university sports programs expanded significantly during the 20th century. Initially, women's athletic activities were largely limited to intramural events or physical education classes. In the United States, the establishment of the Association for Intercollegiate Athletics for Women (AIAW) in 1971 provided a dedicated governing body for women's college sports prior to the NCAA's involvement. The passage of Title IX of the Education Amendments of 1972 mandated equal opportunity in federally funded education programs, which altered resource allocation and scholarship availability for female student-athletes. Globally, the International University Sports Federation (FISU) has implemented policies aimed at parity, ensuring that the FISU World University Games feature a nearly equal number of medal events for men and women.

== Countries ==
=== Armenia ===
The Armenian Student Sports Federation (ARMSSF) is a national non-governmental organization responsible for advocating, supporting and promoting the interests of students' sports and physical activities in Armenia. The headquarters of the federation is located in Yerevan. The Federation maintains numerous cooperation agreements with universities across Armenia.

The Federation is responsible for sending student athletes to participate in various international and European level university sporting championships, including the World University Summer & Winter Games, the FISU World University Championships, and the Pan-European Student Games. The ARMSSF also organizes national events, competitions, and activities for students across Armenia and often collaborates with other sporting federations such as the Armenian Table Tennis Federation, the Armwrestling Federation of Armenia, the Armenian National Rowing and Canoe Federation, and the Figure Skating Federation of Armenia, among others.

The ARMSSF organizes the annual "Student Sports Games of the Republic of Armenia". In November 2014, over 3500 students from 21 Armenian universities participated. The games are sponsored by the Ministry of Education and Science.

=== Australia ===
UniSport organise the UniSport Nationals, an annual multi-sport event among its 43 member universities and tertiary institutions in Australia. Over 7,000 university students participate in the event each year.

The history of university sports has received little academic attention in Australia. In 1863, rugby union was first played in Australia at the University of Sydney when several clubs affiliated with the university were established. One of Australia's earliest cricket teams was founded at the University of Sydney in 1854. This university affiliated team is one of the only teams from that period that still exists.

=== Brazil ===
College sports in Brazil are common in many colleges and universities, although it does not possess the prestige and status of existing sports clubs, being regarded as amateurish. Most of the games are organized by student associations, usually called "Atlética", reprsenting individual study courses, resulting in intramural matches between teams of different courses. There are also extramural competitions between different universities, such as the famous derby matches in São Paulo between the Mackenzie University and the Universidade de São Paulo (USP). Since 1935 the Brazilian University Games (JUBs) are held, originally biennially, but annually since 1968. They are organized by the Brazilian Confederation of College Sports (CBDU).

=== Canada ===
Canada has over 14,000 student athletes within 56 universities under U Sports. U Sports is the national sport governing body of university sport in Canada. There are 12 different sports annually that compete at 21 national championships throughout the year. Compensation is limited to athletic scholarships. There are athletic scholarships that are awarded to student athletes based on academic eligibility and athletic ability. There is a minimum academic requirement for student athletes to achieve the scholarship. There is an amount cap on scholarships which varies between sports. Athletic scholarships are not only determined by the league caps but it varies on the institution, team, and coaches standard. Each student athlete that competes under U Sports has five years of eligibility and must complete 3.0 credits every year prior to competing. There are other sports that compete at the university level but do not fall under the U Sports. These sports may be legislated by the conferences including - Canada West (CanWest), Ontario University Athletics (OUA), Quebec Student Sport Federation (RSEQ), and Atlantic University Sport (AUS). Colleges in Canada compete under the Canadian College Athletic Association (CCAA).

=== China ===
University sport had been established in China by the 1930s. One of these programs was at the Catholic University of Peking. In 1936, members of the team traveled to Japan to participate in a basketball and association football competition. During the early stages of World War II in the region, most universities suspended their sports programs. The exceptions were Fu Ren University and Yanjing University, which kept these programmes open until 1942 before shutting them down.

Chinese universities organised boat races before the Cultural Revolution. These races were modeled after the boat races in England.

The Chinese Basketball University Association (CUBA) is currently China's most popular and competitive collegiate basketball league. In 2018, AliSports acquired the rights to broadcast the league for $150 million. Other university sports associations such as the Chinese Football University Association and the Chinese Marathon University Association are being broadcast by AliSports.

=== India ===
- Maulana Abul Kalam Azad Trophy

=== Indonesia ===
- Liga Mahasiswa

=== Japan ===
Japan began to engage in sports when Western-style sports were introduced to Japan from Europe and the United States as a byproduct of the Westernization policy developed by the Meiji Restoration after three centuries of national isolation. This was accomplished by so-called "hired foreigners" invited by the new government and Japanese people returning to the West.

Western-style sports were introduced to Japan through various channels, but it was the schools that played a particularly important role in the frequent and sustained establishment of Western-style sports in Japan. After the student promulgation of 1873, modern sports began to penetrate various schools, especially higher educational institutions such as universities, higher normal schools, and old high schools. Among the Westernization that was taking place in almost all areas of culture, including economics, politics, industrial technology, thought, literature, music, food, clothing, and architecture, the field of education in particular saw a remarkable development of Western-style sports. This was the groundwork for the emergence of Japan's unique modern sense of sports: the need to give meaning to the practice of sports in the field of education. In the latter half of the 19th century, the elevation of sports was being planned by "tough Christians" activists who were graduates of public schools and Oxford and Cambridge universities, which were attended by the children of gentlemen who were the dominant class of British society and the children of the emerging middle class bourgeoisie who admired them. This view of sports provided the conditions for the Japanese of the time to develop sports in the schoolhouse.

After returning from the US, Hiroshi Hiraoka (平岡凞), a railroad engineer, founded Japan's first baseball team, the Shinbashi Club. Rugby was the first sporting event in Japan, with the founding of the Keio University rugby club in 1899. Soccer was played in 1904 with the founding of the soccer club at Tokyo Higher Normal School (University of Tsukuba). American football dates from 1934 with the founding of the American football club at Rikkyo University.

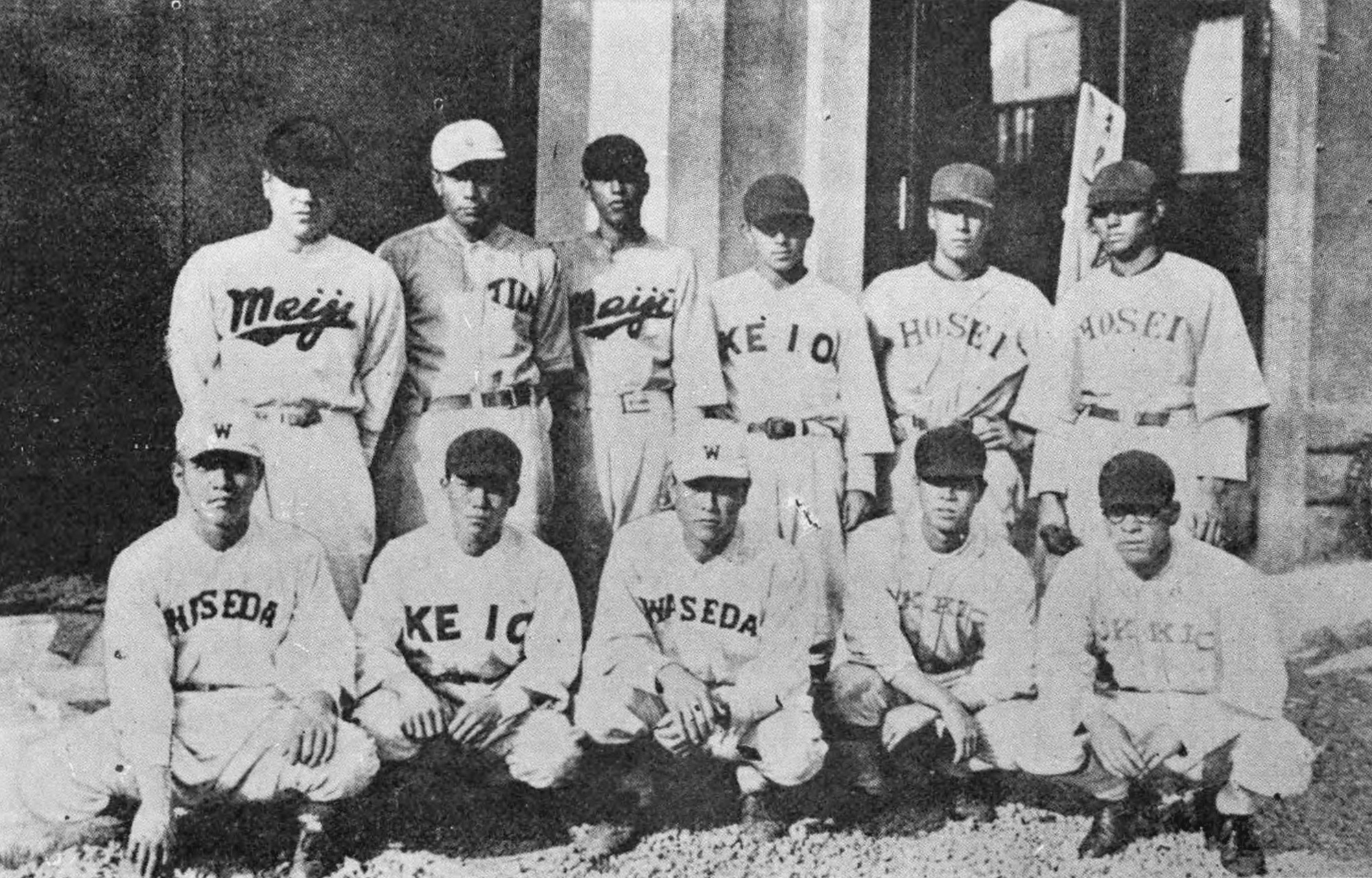
Tokyo Big6 Baseball League players in 1926

Among the sports introduced from abroad, baseball became especially popular during this period. 1894 saw the appearance of the word "yakyū (野球)" as a translation of the word "baseball". Ichiko lost to Waseda University and Keio University in 1904, ushering in the era of both universities. (This later developed into the Waseda-Keio rivalry), and baseball's popularity spilled over into the competitions between technical colleges and junior high schools (Utsunomiya vs. Mito, 5th High vs. Yamaguchi, 1st High vs. 3nd High, etc.). At a time when the mainstream entertainment for citizens was "watching", such as cherry blossom viewing, visiting temples and shrines, and sumo wrestling viewing, it was exciting for citizens to see university students taking part in American-born baseball games. People even gathered to watch the students practicing on the baseball field. The stadium was filled to overflowing with people who gathered to watch the games. Major newspapers such as Asahi Shimbun and Mainichi Shimbun wrote extensively about the success of the games, and college baseball became a kind of social phenomenon.

University sports was established in Japan by the 1930s.

Even after World War II, university sports have established a glorious history and tradition, such as the revival of Waseda-Keio rivalry (ja:硬式野球) at Jingu Stadium in the fall of 1945 and the popularity of Shigeo Nagashima, who supported the golden age of Rikkyo University in the 1960s. From these developments, the athletic club (Undō-bu, ja:運動部) was formed as part of the extracurricular club activities (club-katsudō,ja:クラブ活動) at schools in Japan, which have various academies (bu), and sports activities.At each university, an organization called Taiikukai Undō-bu (ja:体育会運動部) was formed, and the term taiikukai-kei (ja:体育会系) was even coined.

By 1977, Ultimate Frisbee had been established as a university sport. National championships were held that year with Aichi Gakuin University winning the inaugural event. Many of these new sports became popular after being played by university teams (e.g. lacrosse).

In 2019, the Japan Association for University Athletics and Sport (UNIVAS), a general incorporated association, was established to strengthen university sports in Japan. See List of University Sports Competitions and Organizations in Japan (ja) for more information on each athletic organization.

The Kōshien baseball tournament, a high school baseball tournament (played in spring and summer), and the All Japan High School Soccer Tournament, a men's soccer championship, Spring High School Volleyball (ja), basketball, Hanazono (National High School Rugby Tournament) for rugby, Ekiden's Miyakoōji (All-Japan High School Ekiden Championship) in Ekiden (played in winter), are held by high school teams in Japan, These are all the more exciting because they are featured on live TV broadcasts and news programs. However, Few tournaments are nationally televised for student athletes in college sports, such as the All Japan University Rugby Championship. The Tokyo Big6 Baseball League is in Tokyo, and the Koshien Bowl, which is supposed to be the national American football championship, is only exciting in the Kansai region, so it cannot be said to be a nationwide event. The Hakone Ekiden, which is said to increase the number of applicants and the income from examination fees as a result of winning and performing well in the event, is actually a Kanto region event. For more information on soccer, see College soccer#Japan.

In addition to the general entrance examination, Japanese universities also offer Sports Recommendation Admission (ja:スポーツ推薦). This system is used to admit students who have achieved a certain level of athletic success in order to strengthen and maintain the strength of university sports teams. Many universities do this. However, the admission criteria, i.e., the number of students admitted, the degree of athletic achievement, and the way in which the academic performance of the applicant is taken into account, vary from university to university.

=== Mexico ===
Some Mexican universities are affiliated with professional association football teams. One such team is the Universidad Autonoma Pumas.

=== New Zealand ===
The sports teams of New Zealand universities normally compete in local sports leagues against non-university teams. The annual New Zealand University Games covers a large number of sports and competitive cultural activities (such as debating). The event is typically held over Easter, rotating around university centers.

=== Philippines ===
The Federation of School Sports Association of the Philippines (FESSAP) is the governing body recognized by the International University Sports Federation (FISU) in the Philippines. Notably, the two largest athletic associations in Metro Manila, the University Athletic Association of the Philippines (UAAP) and the National Collegiate Athletic Association (Philippines) are not members, but the largest athletic association in Metro Cebu, Cebu Schools Athletic Foundation, Inc., is, as well as most other athletic associations in the provinces.

The UAAP tried to wrest recognition away from FESSAP's recognition by FISU in 2013 but was denied.

=== South Africa ===
Varsity Sports (South Africa) is an organization of university sports leagues in South Africa. The organization currently sponsors seven events: athletics, beach volleyball, association football, field hockey, netball, and rugby sevens.

During the 1970s, the National Union of South African Students worked to create a university sports program where race was not considered in team and competition arrangements. The organisation faced some governmental hurdles. At the time, inter-racial sports was only allowed to be played on private grounds, which meant games and competitions could not be played on public university grounds. They had models from the University of Witwatersrand and the University of Cape Town which had already held such events.

=== South Korea ===
Collegiate sports are organized by the Korea University Sports Federation (KUSF) and students must be enrolled at a member institution in order to participate. It runs the U-League in six sports (baseball, basketball, football, soft tennis and volleyball) and the Club Championship in four team sports (baseball, basketball, football and volleyball). The U-League is mirrored after the domestic professional leagues and a large number of student-athletes eventually turn professional. The Club Championship is contested by college teams operated as intramural clubs.

=== United Kingdom ===
In the late 18th and early 19th centuries, rowing took place at Eton College, Westminster School and other public schools. The first Eton v Harrow cricket match was held in 1805. These led to the first University Match in cricket between Oxford University and Cambridge University in 1827 and The Boat Race, which was first contested in 1829. Sports were assimilated into academic life at Oxford and Cambridge universities in the 19th century and became a feature of Oxford–Cambridge rivalry.

During the Victorian era, a group of students from Cambridge University created a set of 11 rules for football in 1848, building on their experiences of early English public school football games. A document from 1856 names the Cambridge University Association Football Club and its rules, although the club was formed a decade earlier. In 1863, the Football Association of England adopted most of these rules and added three more Laws of the Game, thus creating association football. The first modern athletics clubs in the world were founded at Cambridge University in 1857, and Oxford University in 1860. The first Inter-'Varsity Sports, also called the Cambridge and Oxford Athletic Games, were held in 1864. These early varsity matches spread to other sports, to other universities in the United Kingdom, to college athletics in the United States, and to universities in Commonwealth, European and other countries.

The Scottish Varsity match in rugby football between the University of St Andrews and the University of Edinburgh began in the 1860s, the first varsity match in the world in a code of football. (Note: The 1869 Princeton vs. Rutgers football game was the first intercollegiate football game in the United States while the first intercollegiate rugby football game in the United States took place in 1874 when Harvard University played against McGill University.) The Cambridge and Oxford varsity teams played their first rugby football match in 1872, and the first association football varsity match between the two universities was held in 1874. The University of Liverpool established its University College Athletic Club in 1884. The Oxford v Cambridge women's University Match in (field) hockey was first played in 1895, the oldest women's varsity match in the world. During the Victorian and Edwardian eras, Cambridge University students participated in and contributed to the development of many other sports including tennis, horse racing, boxing, cricket, and women's collegiate sport.

University sport in the United Kingdom began to be organised more formally in the early 20th century, beginning with the formation of the Inter-Varsity Athletics Board of England and Wales (IVAB) and the first inter-varsity track and field competition among nine universities at Manchester University in 1919. Manchester University invited women's teams to compete against them in 1921, which initiated women's inter-varsity competition. Birmingham University hosted the first Inter-Varsity Athletic Board Women's Championships in 1922 and the Women's Inter-Varsity Athletics Board (WIVAB) was formed in 1923.

Multiple organisations subsequently represented university and college sport in the United Kingdom. These organisations evolved into British Universities and Colleges Sport (BUCS), the governing body for university and college sports in the UK since 2008. It runs competitions in 54 sports across over 160 universities and colleges; an annual championship and trophy in 16 sports; and an annual multi-sport event in six sports held over three days. More than 100,000 students compete in BUCS competitions and events each year and over 400 qualified for the FISU World University Games in 2025. The FISU has described it as "one of the most well rounded and developed university sport programmes in the world".

Separately from BUCS, universities in the United Kingdom hold varsity matches with rival universities and offer intramural sport. This includes widespread programmes in university rowing in the United Kingdom. In addition, Scottish Student Sport run over 100 events each year for universities in Scotland including the annual multi-sport Scottish Student Games. Students at universities in Northern Ireland can also participate in Student Sport Ireland events.

=== United States ===
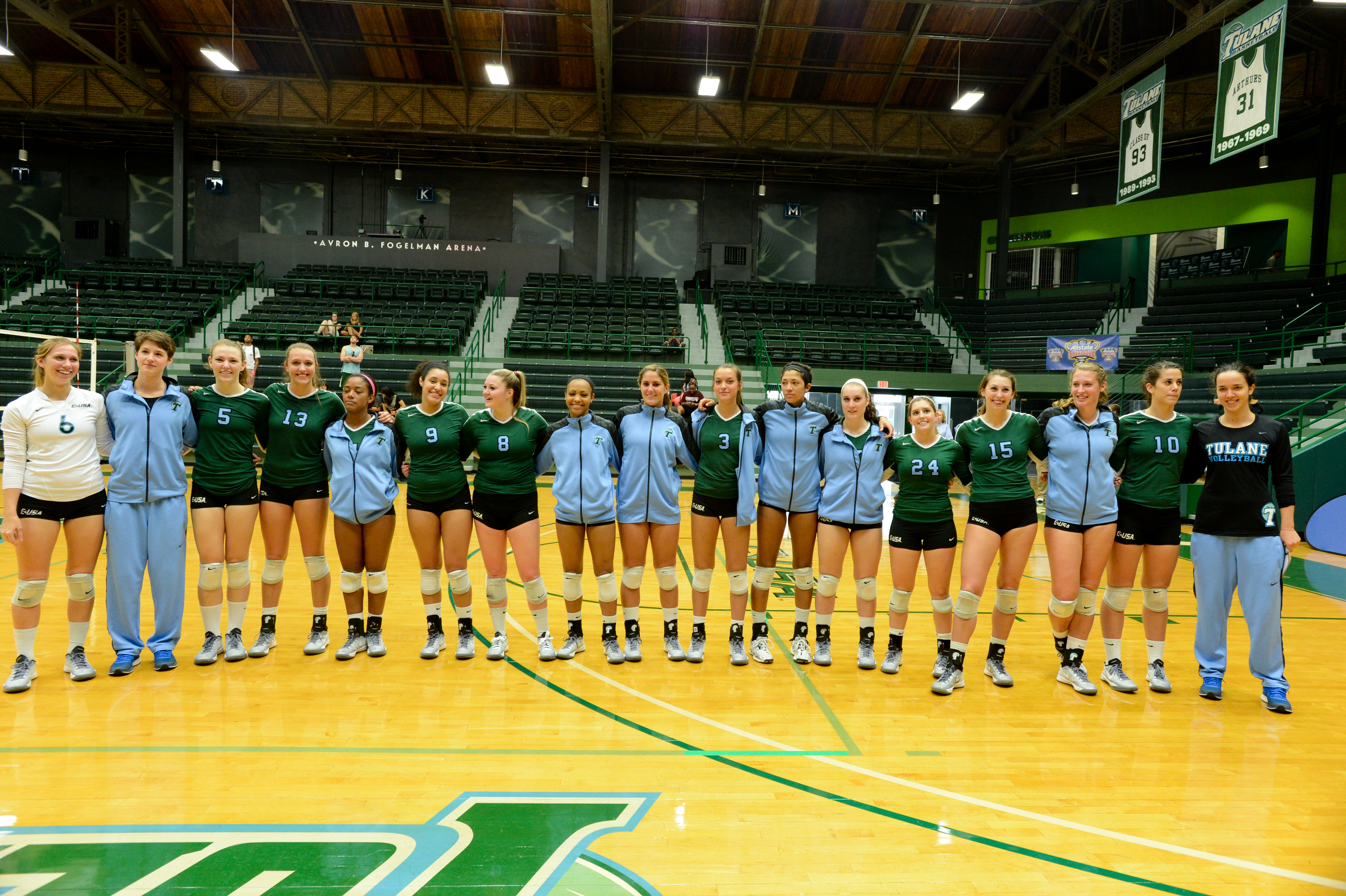
Women's volleyball team of Tulane University in the US

University and college sport is a major enterprise in the United States, with more than 500,000 student athletes attending over 1,100 universities and colleges competing annually. The largest governing bodies are:

- National Collegiate Athletic Association (NCAA)
- National Association of Intercollegiate Athletics (NAIA)
- National Junior College Athletic Association (NJCAA).

Among many other sports, the most-watched competitions are American football and basketball, though there are competitions in many other sports, including badminton, baseball, softball, ice hockey, soccer, rugby union, volleyball, lacrosse, field hockey, cricket, handball, swimming and diving, track and field, golf, tennis, table tennis, pickleball, rowing, and many others depending on the university. In the United States, college athletes are considered amateurs and their compensation is generally limited to athletic scholarships. However, there is disagreement as to whether college student-athletes should be paid. The traditional model of amateurism was modified in 2021 when the NCAA adopted an interim policy allowing student-athletes to earn compensation for their name, image, and likeness (NIL). This regulatory shift enabled athletes to secure endorsement deals without directly compromising their institutional eligibility, though it has sparked ongoing debates regarding competitive balance and the distinction between collegiate and professional sports. College athletics have been criticized for diverting resources away from academic studies, while unpaid student athletes generate income for their universities and private entities. Due to the passage of Title IX in the United States, universities must offer an equal number of scholarships for women and for men.

== Economic impact and commercialization ==
In several regions, particularly in North America, university sports have become a major economic enterprise. In the United States, top-tier NCAA Division I athletic programs generate significant revenue primarily through media broadcasting rights, ticket sales, and corporate sponsorships. For instance, the NCAA's media rights agreements for men's basketball and football championships are valued at billions of dollars over multi-year periods, which are used to cross-subsidize non-revenue sports within athletic departments. This commercialization has led to the construction of large-scale athletic facilities, which universities utilize for student recruitment and institutional promotion. Conversely, critics argue that this financial model creates a competitive arms race, diverting funds from core academic missions and placing financial pressure on athletic departments to maintain profitability.

Competition between student clubs from different colleges, not organized by and therefore not representing the institutions or their faculties, may also be called "intercollegiate" athletics or simply college sports.

=== Vietnam ===
Most Vietnamese universities have sports clubs and school teams and competitions is usually at the campus or city level. Students commonly play association football, basketball, badminton, volleyball, table tennis and track and field. Universities organize internal leagues or friendly matches between schools. These are usually run by student groups or university departments.

== See also ==
- Universiade
- Youth sports
- College association football
- College football (American and Canadian football)
- University and college rivalry
- Varsity team
