= Victoria University (United Kingdom) =

Former federal university in England

- Coat of arms
- Latin: Universitas Victoria
- Motto: Olim armis nunc studiis
- Motto in English: 'Formerly by weapons, now by studies'
- Type: Federal public university
- Active: 1880–1904
- Religious affiliation: None
- Chancellor: Charles, 6th Earl Spencer (1903)
- Vice-Chancellor: Alfred Hopkinson (1903)
- Students: Around 2,600 (1903)
- Location: Manchester, Liverpool, Leeds
- Campus: Urban, three colleges
- Colors

Victoria University was an English federal university established by royal charter on 20 April 1880 at Manchester. It was the fifth university founded in England, established as a university for the North of England open to affiliation by colleges such as Owens College, which immediately did so. University College Liverpool joined the university in 1884, followed by Yorkshire College, Leeds, in 1887. The university and the colleges were distinct corporate bodies until Owens College merged with the university in 1904. A supplemental charter of 1883 enabled the granting of degrees in medicine and surgery.

The aspirations of Manchester and Liverpool to become independent city universities meant that the Victoria University was short-lived. Liverpool left the university in 1903 to become the University of Liverpool; Leeds was granted its own royal charter in 1904 and became the University of Leeds; Manchester, the only remaining site, was granted a new royal charter as the Victoria University of Manchester.

There was also a proposal that York be included: in 1903, F. J. Munby and others (including the Yorkshire Philosophical Society) proposed a 'Victoria University of Yorkshire'. See University of York. In 1886 there had been a proposed scheme for the affiliation of other institutions including technical schools and literary and philosophical societies, which could have assisted the Yorkshire Philosophical Society's proposal, however nothing came of this.

== List of colleges ==
Arms	College	Location	Founded	Joined the Victoria University	Left the Victoria University	Notes
	Owens College	Manchester	1851	1880	1904	Merged with the Victoria University in 1903, and became the Victoria University of Manchester in 1904. In 2004 merged with the University of Manchester Institute of Science and Technology to form the University of Manchester.
	University College Liverpool	Liverpool	1881	1884	1903	Became the University of Liverpool in 1903.
	Yorkshire College	Leeds	1851	1887	1904	Became the University of Leeds in 1904.

== Student life ==
The Christie Cup is an inter-university competition between Liverpool, Leeds and Manchester in numerous sports since 1886. After the Oxford and Cambridge rivalry, the Christie's Championships is the oldest inter–university competition on the English sporting calendar. (Note: Fourth oldest in the United Kingdom and one of the oldest in the world. The Scottish Varsity match in rugby union between the University of St Andrews and the University of Edinburgh dates to the 1860s. The Scottish Boat Race between the University of Glasgow and the University of Edinburgh was first held in 1877. In the United States, the Harvard–Yale Regatta dates back to 1852. The 1869 Princeton vs. Rutgers football game was the first intercollegiate football (soccer) game in the U.S. while the first intercollegiate rugby football game took place in 1874 when Harvard University played McGill University.) The cup was a benefaction of Richard Copley Christie, a professor at Owens College.

== Officers ==
=== Vice-Chancellors ===
- 1880–1887: Joseph Gouge Greenwood (also Principal of Owens College 1857–1889)
- 1887–1891: Adolphus William Ward (also Principal of Owens College 1889–1897)
- 1891–1895: Gerald Henry Rendall (University College, Liverpool)
- 1895–1897: Adolphus William Ward (second term)
- 1897–1901: Nathan Bodington (Yorkshire College, Leeds)
- 1901–1903: Alfred Hopkinson (also Principal of Owens College 1898–1904; afterwards Vice-Chancellor of the Victoria University of Manchester until 1913)

=== Chancellors ===
- 1880–1891: The 7th Duke of Devonshire
- 1892–1904: The 6th Earl Spencer, afterwards Chancellor of the Victoria University of Manchester.

== Arms ==
The armorial bearings of the Victoria University showed charges representative of the three colleges: Per pale argent and gules, a rose counterchanged, in dexter chief a terrestrial globe semée of bees Or, in sinister chief a fleece Or, in point a liverbird rising argent, beaked and membered gules holding in the beak a fish argent with the motto Olim armis nunc studiis ('Formerly by weapons, now by studies'). The globe and bees is for Manchester, the liver bird for Liverpool, the fleece for Yorkshire and the rose for the counties of Lancaster (red rose) and York (white rose). The arms fell into abeyance in 1904 when those of Owens College were adopted for the Victoria University of Manchester.

== See also ==
- Armorial of UK universities
- Collegiate University
- List of split up universities
- Red brick university
