= The Varsity Yacht Race =

Race between Oxford and Cambridge University

The Varsity Yacht Race is a yacht race between Oxford University and Cambridge University.

The Varsity Yacht Race has been raced since 2003 and became a Half-Blue sport in 2008; since then a full Blue can be awarded at the discretion of the Blues committee The format is fleet racing on the Solent using 37' yachts with a mixed crew of eight. A second boat that welcomes less experienced racers also competes in the same fleet against a Cambridge second boat. As of 2008 the series stands 3–2 to Oxford. The teams compete for the Yacht Varsity Trophy.

The race is normally run just before BUSA and after the end of Lent term, to give both teams time to train up some of their new intake and get more training before BUSA. The racing normally takes place during a Sunsail regatta weekend, but entering other races, such alternating between the Fastnet and Cork or Cowes Week has been mooted for the future if funding can be found. The Cambridge University Cruising Club (CUCrC) donated a cup, which is awarded to the winner each year.

Race Results
2007-08, Cambridge
2006-07, Oxford
2005-06, Oxford
2004-05, Cambridge
2003-04, Oxford

== See also ==
- List of British and Irish varsity matches
- Oxford–Cambridge rivalry
