= Christie Cup =

University sports competition in England

The Christie Cup, also known as the Christie Championships, is an annual varsity match among the universities of Leeds, Liverpool and Manchester contested in numerous sports. It has been held since 1886.

== Founding ==
The annual event is named after the benefactor Richard Copley Christie, who was a professor of History and Political Economy in Manchester from 1854 to 1866. After his death in 1901, his widow Mary Helen Christie donated the Christie Cup and Shield which is still played for today. The competition began when Leeds (Yorkshire College), Liverpool (University College Liverpool), and Manchester (Owens College) were constituent colleges of the federal Victoria University.

Along with the well-known rivalry between Oxford and Cambridge, the Christie Cup is one of the oldest inter-university rivalries in the world, the second oldest in England and the fourth oldest in the United Kingdom. (Note: The Scottish Varsity match in rugby union between the University of St Andrews and the University of Edinburgh dates to the 1860s. The Scottish Boat Race between the University of Glasgow and the University of Edinburgh was first held in 1877. In the United States, the Harvard–Yale Regatta dates back to 1852. The 1869 Princeton vs. Rutgers football game was the first intercollegiate football (soccer) game in the U.S. while the first intercollegiate rugby football game took place in 1874 when Harvard University played McGill University.)

== Modern competition ==
The universities of Leeds, Liverpool and Manchester compete annually in over 30 different sports. The contested competitions range from traditional British sports like football, hockey, rugby league, rugby union, tennis, and water polo to modern competitions like climbing or ultimate frisbee.

Students compete in 32 different sports, all rolled into one afternoon of competition. As a triangular competition, the Christie Championships is recognised nationally as one of the largest sporting varsities with more than 1,500 students taking part. The competitions are held each year in April or May on two Wednesday afternoons to be hosted by one of the three universities each. Manchester had won for five consecutive years until 2011 where the University of Leeds won the competition on home soil.

== Results ==
Leeds won nine of out ten championships from 1993 to 2002. Manchester won 15 cups up to and including 2019.

In 2018, Liverpool won the title for the first time since 1991.

In 1926, Leeds won the competition for the first time in 15 years, with a football team that included chemist Charles Shoppee.

== See also ==
- List of British and Irish varsity matches
