= Bristol Boat Race =

Rowing race between Bristol and UWE

The Bristol Boat Race

Event information
- Race area: Bristol Harbour, Bristol
- Dates: 1995
- Competitors: UWE, UBR

The Bristol Boat Race (also called The Varsity Boat Race) is an annual event between the University of the West of England Boat Club and the University of Bristol Boat Club, held on the historic Bristol Harbour, Bristol, England. It is usually held in the summer term after the Easter break, often the week before, or the week after British Universities and Colleges Regatta, although in the first years of the event was often held in February.

== History ==
Founded in 1995, it has been claimed to be the second oldest university Boat Race in the United Kingdom, after The Boat Race between Oxford and Cambridge, although the Scottish Boat Race between Glasgow and Edinburgh universities dates back to 1877.

In the early years of the event the University of Bristol dominated, but in recent years UWE has become a much greater force and the event has become hotly contested. It has become instrumental in improving the calibre of both boat clubs, of which are now regarded as two highly competitive university rowing institutions in the United Kingdom.

== The course ==
The course runs over a distance of 1.3 kilometres (0.8 mi) from the Cumberland Basin towards the Bristol City Centre and finishes at Canon's Wharf Amphitheatre. Several course changes have been proposed in recent years, due to the nature of the bends providing each side with significant advantages at different stages of the course.

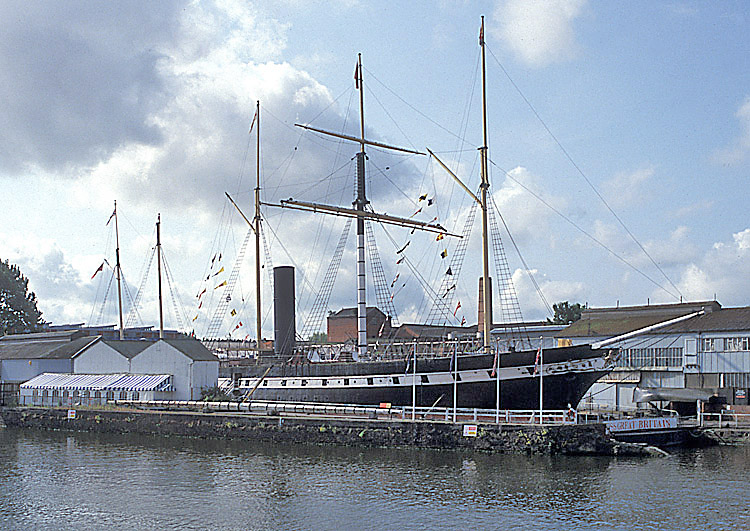
The SS Great Britain marks the third distance mark in the Varsity Race.

== The race ==
The Coin toss/Presidents Slap is a tradition by which the winning university from the previous year challenges the losing university to the year's race; it also decides the banks each crew will race on.

All competing crews are required to attend the weigh-in, usually held the day before or on the day of the race. This gives the opportunity for the crews to face off against their opposite number before the race.

Depending on the university intake each year, each University will field the following crews:

- Men's 1st VIII
- Men's 2nd VIII/IV
- Women's 1st VIII
- Women's 2nd VIII/IV
- Men's Novice 1st & 2nd VIIIs
- Women's Novice 1st & 2nd VIIIs
- Men's & Women's Alumni VIIIs

However this is subject to change, in accordance with both universities' requirements.

== History of the Bristol Boat Race ==
OVERALL TALLY

BRISTOL – 13

UWE – 8

Men's Senior VIII

UWE – 13

BRISTOL s- 7

1 Nulled

- 1995 Bristol win varsity

-Development Men's VIII UWE

-Development Women's VIII UWE

-Senior Women's 1st IV UoB

-Senior Men's 1st IV UoB

-Senior Women's 1st VIII UoB

-Senior Men's 1st VIII UoB

- 1996 Bristol win varsity

-Novice Men's VIII UoB

-Novice Women's VIII UoB

-Alumni Men's VIII UoB

-Senior Men's VIII UoB

-Senior Women's VIII UoB

- 1997 Bristol win varsity

-Novice Women's VIII UoB

-Novice Men's VIII UWE

-Senior Women's VIII UoB

-Senior Men's IV UWE

-Senior Men's VIII UoB

- 1998 Bristol win Varsity

-Novice Women's VIIIs UoB

-Novice Men's VIIIs UoB

-Senior Women's IVs UoB

-Senior Men's IVs UWE

-Senior Women's VIIIs UoB

-Senior Men's VIIIs UoB

-Alumni Mixed VIIIs UoB

-Alumni Men's VIIIs UWE

- 1999 Bristol win Varsity

-Novice Women's VIIIs UWE

-Novice Men's VIIIs UWE

-Senior Women's IVs UoB

-Senior Men's IVs UoB

-Senior Women's VIIIs UoB

-Senior Men's VIIIs UoB

-Alumni Women's VIIIs UoB

-Alumni Men's VIIIs UoB

- 2000 Bristol win varsity

-Novice Men's IVs UoB

-Novice Women's VIIIs UoB

-Novice Men's VIIIs UoB

-Senior Men's IVs UWE

-Senior Women's VIIIs UoB

-Senior Men's VIIIs UoB

-Alumni Men's IVs UoB

-Alumni Men's VIIIs UoB

- 2001 Bristol win varsity

-Novice Women's VIIIs UoB

-Novice Men's VIIIs UWE

-Senior Women's VIIIs UoB

-Senior Men's VIIIs UoB

- 2002 Bristol win varsity

-Novice Women's VIIIs UoB

-Novice Men's VIIIs UWE

-Senior Women's VIIIs UoB

-Senior Men's VIIIs UoB

-Alumni Men's VIIIs UoB

- 2003 UWE win varsity

-Novice Women's VIIIs UWE

-Novice Men's VIIIs UWE

-Senior Women's VIIIs UoB

-Senior Men's VIIIs UWE

-Alumni Men's VIIIs UWE

- 2004 UWE win varsity

-Novice Women's VIIIs UWE

-Novice Men's VIIIs UWE

-Senior Women's VIIIs UoB

-Senior Men's VIIIs UWE

-Alumni Men's VIIIs UoB

- 2005 UWE win varsity

-Novice Women's VIIIs UWE

-Novice Men's VIIIs UoB

-Senior Women's VIIIs UWE

-Senior Men's VIIIs UWE

-Alumni Men's VIIIs UoB

- 2006 UWE win varsity

-Men's first VIIIs – dead heat UWE (re-row)

-Women's first VIIIs UWE

-Men's alumni VIIIs UWE

-Women's novices UWE

-Men's novices UoB

- 2007 Bristol win varsity

-Men's first VIIIs – UoB

-Women's first VIIIs – UWE

-Men's alumni VIIIs – UoB

-Women's novices – UoB

-Men's novices – UoB

- 2008 UWE win varsity

-Men's first VIIIs – UWE

-Women's first VIIIs – UWE

-Men's alumni VIIIs – UWE

-Women's novices – UoB

-Men's novices – UoB

- 2009 Bristol win varsity

-Men's first VIIIs – Nulled after rule confusion at start

-Men's Second VIIIs – UoB

-Women's first VIIIs – UWE

-Men's alumni VIIIs – UWE

-Women's novices – UoB

-Men's novices first VIIIs – UoB

-Men's novices second VIIIs – UoB

- 2010 Varsity Champions – UoB

-Men's 1st VIII – UoB

-Women's 1st VIII – UoB

-Men's Novice 1st VIII – UoB

-Women's Novice 1st VIII – UWE

-Men's Alumni VIII – UoB

-Women's Alumni VIII – UWE

-Men's Novice 2nd IV – UoB

- 2011 Varsity Champions – UWE

-Men's 1st VIII – UWE

-Women's 1st VIII – UoB

-Men's Novice 1st VIII – UWE

-Women's Novice 1st VIII – UWE

-Men's 2nd VIII – UWE

-Men's Alumni VIII – UoB

-Women's Alumni VIII – UWE

- 2012 Varsity Champions – UoB

-Men's 1st VIII – UWE

-Women's 1st VIII – UoB

-Men's Novice 1st VIII – UoB

-Women's Novice 1st VIII – UoB

-Men's 2nd VIII – UWE

-Men's Alumni VIII – UoB

-Women's Alumni VIII – UoB

-Women's 2nd IV+ – UoB

-Men's Novice 2nd VIII – UWE

- 2013 Varsity Champions – UWE

-Men's 1st VIII- UWE

-Men's 2nd VIII- UWE

-Women's 1st VIII- UoB

-Men's Novice 1st VIII- UWE

-Men's Novice 2nd VIII- UWE

-Women's Novice 1st VIII- UoB

-Women's Novice 2nd VIII- UWE

- 2014 Varsity Champions – UWE

-Men's 1st VIII- UWE

-Men's 2nd VIII- UWE

-Women's 1st VIII- UWE

-Men's Novice 1st VIII- UWE

-Women's Novice 1st VIII- UoB

- 2015 Varsity Champions - UoB

-Men's 1st VIII- UWE

-Men's 2nd VIII- UWE

-Women's 1st VIII- UWE

-Men's Novice 1st VIII- UoB

-Men's Novice 2nd VIII- UWE

-Women's Novice 1st VIII- UoB

== The Varsity Challenge Cup ==
A new Varsity Challenge Cup was awarded to both Universities in the autumn 2012, marking 30 years of the event in preparation for presentation after the 2013 race. The winning Varsity Captain's name will be engraved on the silver base. This trophy replaces the inter-university blade awarded to the winning university.

== See also ==
- List of British and Irish varsity matches
- University rowing in the United Kingdom
