= Rugby League Varsity Match =

Annual rugby league match

The Rugby League Varsity Match is an annual rugby league match between Cambridge University and Oxford University. The first Varsity match took place on Sunday 26 April 1981 at Craven Cottage.

== Results ==
Year	Winners	Score	Venue
1981	Oxford	16–9	Craven Cottage, London
1982	Cambridge	30–8	Crystal Palace, London
1983	Cambridge	25–8	Maidstone, Kent
1984	Oxford	18–14	Craven Cottage, London
1985	Oxford	8–6	Headingley, Leeds
1986	Cambridge	32–14	Headingley, Leeds
1987	Cambridge	36–5	Headingley, Leeds
1988	Cambridge	18–8	Headingley, Leeds
1989	Oxford	12–9	Headingley, Leeds
1990	Cambridge	20–15	Headingley, Leeds
1991	Oxford	24–4	Headingley, Leeds
1992	Oxford	32–23	Headingley, Leeds
1993	Cambridge	50–18	Crystal Palace, London
1994	Draw	22–22	Old Deer Park, London
1995	Cambridge	16–8	Old Deer Park, London
1996	Cambridge	48–18	Old Deer Park, London
1997	Cambridge	26–22	Richmond Athletic Ground, London
1998	Cambridge	24–10	Richmond Athletic Ground, London
1999	Cambridge	14–10	Richmond Athletic Ground, London
2000	Oxford	35–17	Richmond Athletic Ground, London
2001	Oxford	22–16	Richmond Athletic Ground, London
2002	Cambridge	22–10	Richmond Athletic Ground, London
2003	Oxford	25–13	Richmond Athletic Ground, London
2004	Oxford	29–16	Richmond Athletic Ground, London
2005	Cambridge	17–16	Richmond Athletic Ground, London
2006	Cambridge	44–0	Twickenham Stoop, London
2007	Oxford	20–14	Twickenham Stoop, London
2008	Oxford	38–10	Twickenham Stoop, London
2009	Cambridge	20–4	Twickenham Stoop, London
2010	Oxford	32–22	Twickenham Stoop, London
2011	Oxford	60–16	Twickenham Stoop, London
2012	Oxford	48–0	Richmond Athletic Ground, London
2013	Oxford	32–4	Honourable Artillery Company, London
2014	Oxford	40–0	Honourable Artillery Company, London
2015	Oxford	42–0	Honourable Artillery Company, London
2016	Oxford	70–0	Honourable Artillery Company, London
2017	Oxford	48–10	Honourable Artillery Company, London
2018	Oxford	24–6	Honourable Artillery Company, London
2019	Oxford	44–10	University Football Ground, Cambridge
2020	Oxford	32–20	Iffley Road, Oxford
2021	Cambridge	14–8	University Football Ground, Cambridge
2022	Oxford	18–14	Iffley Road, Oxford
2023	Cambridge	14–12	Grantchester Road, Cambridge
2024	Oxford	14–6	Iffley Road, Oxford
2025	Oxford	20–4	University Football Ground, Cambridge
2026	Cambridge	22–20	Iffley Road, Oxford

== See also ==
- List of British and Irish varsity matches
- Oxford–Cambridge rivalry
- Student Rugby League
- The Varsity Match
- University Sporting Blue
