= College Varsity =

Annual inter-collegiate sporting event

- Teams: Colleges of Durham University; Colleges of the University of York
- First meeting: 2014

Statistics
- Most wins: Tied (6)
- All-time record: 6 (Durham) – 6 (York)
- Website: college-sport.yorksu.org/events/college-varsity

College Varsity is an annual inter-collegiate sporting event between colleges from the University of York and Durham University. Each University has qualification systems to decide which college represents each University in each sport. The host has alternated between the two universities, except for 2020 to 2022 when the University of York hosted it back to back following the event's cancellation in 2021.

The inaugural event took place at the University of York in 2014, as a replacement to the defunct White Rose Varsity Tournament between the University of York and the University of Hull.

As of May 2026, the tournament has taken place twelve times, with both universities winning six times each and the longest run of wins being three from the University of York between 2020 and 2024, including their first away win in 2024. The tournament was cancelled in 2021 due to the COVID-19 pandemic).

== Results ==
- Durham = 6 wins (4 home, 2 away)
- York = 6 wins (5 home, 1 away)

No.	Year	Host	Winner		Runner-up		Ref.
1	2014	York	Durham	37	York	27	
2	2015	Durham	Durham	60	York	36	
3	2016	York	York	56	Durham	48	
4	2017	Durham	Durham	94	York	31	
5	2018	York	York	73	Durham	55	
6	2019	Durham	Durham	65	York	46	
7	2020	York	York	76	Durham	47	
—N/a	2021	Cancelled due to the COVID-19 pandemic					
8	2022	York	York	85	Durham	43	
9	2023	Durham	York	65	Durham	63	
10	2024	York	York	72	Durham	48	
11	2025	Durham	Durham	77	York	56	
12	2026	York	Durham	67	York	51	

== See also ==
- List of British and Irish varsity matches
- White Rose Varsity Tournament
- Roses Tournament
