= University of Bristol Boat Club =

British rowing club

- Location: Saltford Rowing Centre, Bath Road, Saltford, Bristol, England
- Coordinates: 51.398521°N 2.447412°W
- Founded: 1909
- Affiliations: British Rowing (boat code UBR)
- Website: uobboatclub.co.uk

University of Bristol Boat Club is a rowing club on the River Avon based at the Saltford Rowing Centre, Bath Road, Saltford, Bristol, England. The boathouse is shared between the Avon County Rowing Club, Monkton Combe School Boat Club, Canoe Avon and the Bristol Empire Dragon Boat club.

== History ==
The club was founded in 1909. The Saltford boathouse was granted planning permission during November 1926.

The club won the prestigious Henley Prize at the Henley Regatta in 1991.

From 1995 UBR and the University of the West of England Boat Club challenged each other to an annual boat race, which became known as the Bristol Boat Race.

== Honours ==
=== Henley Royal Regatta ===
Year	Winning crew
1991	Henley Prize
