= Varsity Trip =

Ski trip for students of Oxford and Cambridge universities

- Founded: 1922
- Headquarters: Tignes, France
- Website: https://www.varsitytrip.com

Varsity Trip is the official annual ski trip organised for students of Oxford and Cambridge universities. The first event was held in Wengen, Switzerland in 1922, with British students racing against each other and the local Wengen Ski Club. The event attracted 3,200 participants in 2011, and is the largest student snowsports event in the world.

== History ==
Varsity Trip was founded as the facilitator of the Blues Ski Races between the University of Oxford and Cambridge University in 1922; at this time skiing was an expensive sport and it was almost exclusively attended by the racers and their families. However, even by the early 1960s the trip had grown to over 500 people of a wider range of abilities. Whilst originally a Christmas and New Year event, the trip has also gradually moved earlier to take advantage of lower prices. The trip now usually takes place in the first week of the university holidays in December, which is the first week of the season for most resorts. On all but a couple of occasions, the trip has visited the Alps, with the majority of recent trips travelling to one of the larger resorts in the French Alps, such as Val Thorens and Tignes.

The Final Night Party is an extremely popular event each year, usually with performances from global superstars. In 2015, Tinie Tempah performed, with Ms. Dynamite supporting.

== Racing ==
The Blues race bears the distinction of being the world's oldest team ski event, with the racing event starting off as purely a downhill event, with slalom, jumping and langlauf counting for the first time in 1929. By 1955, Giant Slalom had been introduced, and the downhill and non-alpine events dropped. This is the same format that the competition takes to this day, with teams of 6 competing across the two disciplines. The combined time for each team is the 4 fastest racers in each discipline. A separate women's event was first run in 1980. More recently, a selection of supplementary events have been trialled including the Combi and Super G events. The most recent competition to be introduced was the Super G event in 2007, which was won by Ben van Zwanenberg (Oxford).

The sport now has a Half Blue status at both universities, but this was not originally the case with the matter still being debated prior to the 1930 races. The top four racers in the first men's and women's teams are automatically awarded Half Blues. At the discretion of the Race Captain, another two Half Blues can be awarded; and, if certain conditions have been met, a Full Blue can be awarded. In 2014, the competition extended to snowboarders.

Notable past competitors include Roger Bushell who captained the Cambridge side and won the slalom event in 1931, and physicist Ondrej Krivanek who won the slalom in 1975. A number of Olympic skiers have also competed in the event including James Palmer-Tomkinson who won for Oxford in 1935 prior to competing in the 1936 Winter Olympics (the first Olympics at which Alpine Skiing was an event), his son Christopher Palmer-Tomkinson who also won for Oxford in 1961 before attending the 1964 Winter Olympics, and V. Goodwin in 1955.

== Controversy ==
In January 2011, the December 2010 Varsity Trip's "Valley Rally" was criticised in the press after photographs were published on Facebook showing half naked students taking part in debauchery and lewd contests. The Scott Dunn travel agency, provider of prizes for the event which was held at Val Thorens in the French Alps, issued a statement saying that they did not endorse the "inappropriate behaviour" and that they "will have no future involvement" with the student-run event. The dean of St Anne's College at Oxford, Dr. Geraldine Hazburn, warned students that such behaviour was against school regulations, and that they should not "intentionally or recklessly engage in conduct likely to bring the college into disrepute". The "Valley Rally" has not taken place on the trip since.

== See also ==
- List of British and Irish varsity matches
- Oxford–Cambridge rivalry
