= Temple Challenge Cup =

Event at the Henley Royal Regatta

- Venue: Henley Royal Regatta, River Thames
- Location: Henley-on-Thames, Oxfordshire
- Dates: 1990 – present

The Temple Challenge Cup is one of the eights races at Henley Royal Regatta at Henley-on-Thames on the River Thames in England. It is open to male crews from universities, colleges or schools. Combined entries from two colleges of the same university, or from different schools, are allowed. There are restrictions on individual rowers to ensure that the faster crews row in the Ladies' Challenge Plate. A rower cannot take part in this race if he has previously won an event at Henley, except The Thames, The Wyfold, The Britannia, The Prince Albert, The Princess Elizabeth, or The Fawley Challenge Cups. The race is limited to 32 entrants.

== History ==
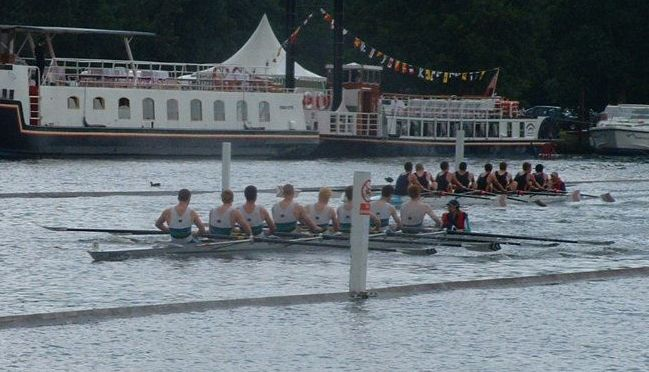
Two crews racing in the Temple Challenge Cup at Henley in 2003

The event was first staged in 1990, and, after a successful first year, the Regatta Stewards decided to make it a permanent fixture. The cup, awarded to the winning crew on finals day, was made in 1835 by Charles Fox, and has been engraved with a sketch of the Temple on Temple Island at the start of the regatta course.

There was no foreign winner until 1996, when the United States' Yale University won the final. Since 2000, foreign crews have dominated the event winning 14 times in 18 years with 10 of the winners hailing from the United States. Only Oxford Brookes University Boat Club have broken the foreign stranglehold on the trophy, winning the event a record seven times in 2006, 2014, 2016, 2017, 2019, 2022 and 2023.

== Past winners ==
=== As Henley Prize ===
Year	Winner	Runner-Up	Ref
1990	Imperial College Boat Club	Trinity College Dublin	
1991	University of Bristol Boat Club	Imperial College Boat Club	

=== As Temple Challenge Cup ===
Year	Winner	Runner-Up	Ref
1992	Imperial College Boat Club	Trinity College Dublin	
1993	Oxford Brookes University Boat Club	Trinity College Dublin	
1994	Imperial College Boat Club	Trinity College Dublin	
1995	Oxford Brookes University Boat Club	Trinity College Dublin	
1996	Yale University, USA	Imperial College Boat Club	
1997	Goldie Boat Club	Imperial College Boat Club & King's College, London	
1998	Imperial College Boat Club	University of Wales College, Cardiff	
1999	Cambridge University Boat Club	Imperial College Boat Club	
2000	Yale University, USA	Exeter University	
2001	Harvard University	Oxford Brookes University Boat Club	
2002	Harvard University	Oxford Brookes University Boat Club	
2003	Princeton University "A", USA	Princeton University "B", USA	
2004	ASR Nereus, Netherlands	DSR Proteus-Eretes, Netherlands	
2005	Trinity College, Hartford, USA	Yale University, USA	
2006	Oxford Brookes University Boat Club	Cornell University, USA	
2007	University of California, Berkeley, USA	Cornell University, USA	
2008	University of Western Ontario, Canada	Trinity College, Hartford, USA	
2009	Princeton University, USA	Brown University, USA	
2010	University of Washington, USA	ASR Nereus, Netherlands	
2011	University of California, Berkeley, USA	ASR Nereus, Netherlands	
2012	University of Washington, USA	Brown University, USA	
2013	DSRV Laga, Netherlands	Harvard University, USA	
2014	Oxford Brookes University Boat Club	Brown University, USA	
2015	ASR Nereus, Netherlands	Universite de Lyon BC, France	
2016	Oxford Brookes University Boat Club	University of California BC, Berkeley, USA	
2017	Oxford Brookes University Boat Club	University of London Boat Club	
2018	University of Washington, USA	Oxford Brookes University Boat Club	
2019	Oxford Brookes University Boat Club	Northeastern University BC, USA	
2020	No competition due to COVID-19 pandemic		
2021	ASR Nereus, Netherlands	Imperial College Boat Club	
2022	Oxford Brookes	University of Washington BC, USA	
2023	Oxford Brookes	Syracuse University BC, USA	
2024	Oxford Brookes	Princeton University 'A', U.S.A.	
2025	Harvard University	Oxford Brookes	
2026	Cambridge University Boat Club 'A'	University of Washington, USA	
