= University of the West of England Boat Club =

British rowing club

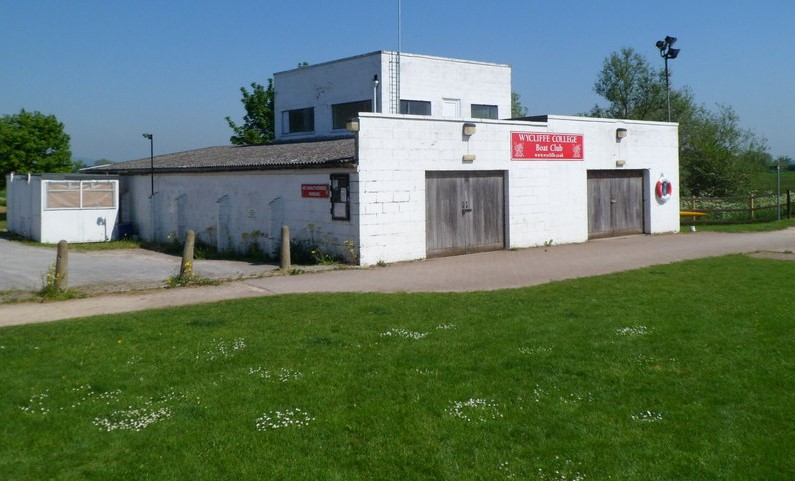

- Location: Wycliffe College boathouse, Junction Bridge, Saul, Gloucestershire, England
- Coordinates: 51.782258°N 2.354671°W
- Affiliations: British Rowing (boat code UWE)
- Website: uweboatclub.weebly.com

University of the West of England Boat Club is a rowing club on the Gloucester and Sharpness Canal, based at Wycliffe College boathouse, Junction Bridge, Saul, Gloucestershire, England. The club runs four squads and belongs to the University of the West of England, Bristol. The club uses the boathouse owned by the Wycliffe College Boat Club.

== History ==
From 1995 UWE and the University of Bristol Boat Club challenged each other to an annual boat race, which became known as the Bristol Boat Race.

In 2010 the club produced a national champion crew when winning the open lightweight quad sculls.

== Honours ==
=== National champions ===
| Year | Winning crew/s |
|---|---|
| 2010 | Open Lightweight 4x |
