= White Rose Varsity Tournament =

Taking its name from the 15th century Wars of the Roses where York were represented by the white rose the White Rose Varsity Tournament was a sports competition originally between the two York-based universities in the UK; University of York and York St John University and later between the University of York and the University of Hull. Started in 2005 by Athletics Union president Stuart Leslie of the University of York and his counterpart from the then York St John College, it ran annually 2008 and was revived in 2010 before Hull replaced York St John in 2011 an attempt to make the tournament more competitive. This second version of the tournament ran for only three years before being cancelled after the 2013 event due to York's unhappiness with the organisation of the event at Hull and their "frustrat[ion] with the spirit and quality of competition". The tournament was replaced for York by the College Varsity competition between the Colleges of the University of York and the Colleges of Durham University, and for Hull by the Humber Games against the University of Lincoln.

== Results ==
Hull vs York:

- 2013: Hull (at Hull)
- 2012: York (at York)
- 2011: York (at York)

York vs York St John:

- 2010: York
- 2009: No competition
- 2008: York
- 2007: York
- 2006: York
- 2005: York

== Timing ==
Set on the Wednesday immediately after BUCS scheduled matches stop (around mid-February), it was intended to be timed well before any exams meaning the most players could take part.

York university also use it as a warm up for their other varsity; the Roses Tournament.

== List of sports ==
The teams that took part in the 2005 tournament:

- Men's Badminton
- Women's Badminton
- Men's Basketball
- Women's Basketball
- Men's Football 1
- Men's Football 2
- Men's Football 3
- Men's Football 4
- Women's Football
- Men's Hockey
- Women's Hockey 1
- Women's Hockey 2
- Netball 1
- Netball 2
- Netball 3
- Netball 4
- Men's Rugby 1
- Men's Rugby 2
- Men's Volleyball
- Women's Volleyball
- Indoor Cricket
- Street Hockey
- Rowing (Novice)
- Rowing (Senior)
- Rowing (Mixed)
- Trampolining

== See also ==
- List of British and Irish varsity matches
