= University Golf Match =

Annual golf match between Oxford and Cambridge Universities

The University Golf Match (commonly known as the Varsity Match) is the annual golf match contested between the Full Blue golf teams from Oxford and Cambridge universities. Dating back to 1878, it is the oldest amateur event in golf, as the first Amateur Championship was played in 1885. It is also the oldest team event in English golf. Scottish team matches were common after 1849, and included St Andrews University matches against Fife artisan clubs.

== History ==
The first University Golf Match was played on 6 March 1878 at Wimbledon Common, courtesy of London Scottish Golf Club, which hosted the fixture for 19 years until it moved to Royal St George's Golf Club in 1897. The match was contested by four singles matches, and used the holes up method of scoring. Oxford, led by Horace Hutchinson, won by a margin of 24 holes.

In 1898 the Oxford and Cambridge Golfing Society (OCGS) was founded; members qualify by virtue of their participation in the University Golf Match. Since 1920, the OCGS has hosted the President's Putter, an annual match-play competition for its members held at Rye Golf Club, in Rye, East Sussex.

== Venues ==
Until the 1890s there were very few golf courses in England, and none of appropriate quality in the Oxford and Cambridge areas. The University Match was initially played on Wimbledon Common, which, along with Royal Blackheath, was one of just a handful of courses in the London area at the time. Since then, the University Golf Match has been played at courses all over the United Kingdom, including Royal St George's, Royal Cinque Ports, Royal Liverpool, Muirfield, Ganton, Walton Heath, Hunstanton, Aldeburgh, Royal Porthcawl, and Sunningdale. The choice of venue alternates between the teams, and the match is traditionally played every five years at Rye.

== Present-day competition ==
Men - Each team comprises ten players plus two reserves. The reserves traditionally play the "Dinner Match" on the Thursday of the Varsity Match week: an 18-hole alternate shot foursomes match, followed by an 18-hole singles match. The losing team is responsible for paying the bill for the Varsity Match dinner on the Saturday evening.

The University Match itself is contested over the course of two days. Five 36-hole foursomes matches are played on the Friday, and ten 36-hole singles matches are played on the Saturday.

Ladies – 36-hole foursomes followed by 36 holes singles the next day contested between 6 ladies from each team, with one reserve. The Ladies' match is held on the Tuesday and Wednesday of Varsity week as the beginning of the matches.

Stymies and Divots - The Stymies (Cambridge) v. Divots (Oxford) match occurs on the Wednesday before the Blues Varsity Match, featuring five 18-hole foursomes matches in the morning, followed by 10 18-hole singles matches in the afternoon.

== See also ==
- List of British and Irish varsity matches
- Oxford–Cambridge rivalry
