= Tolstoy Cup =

Annual British football match

The Tolstoy Cup
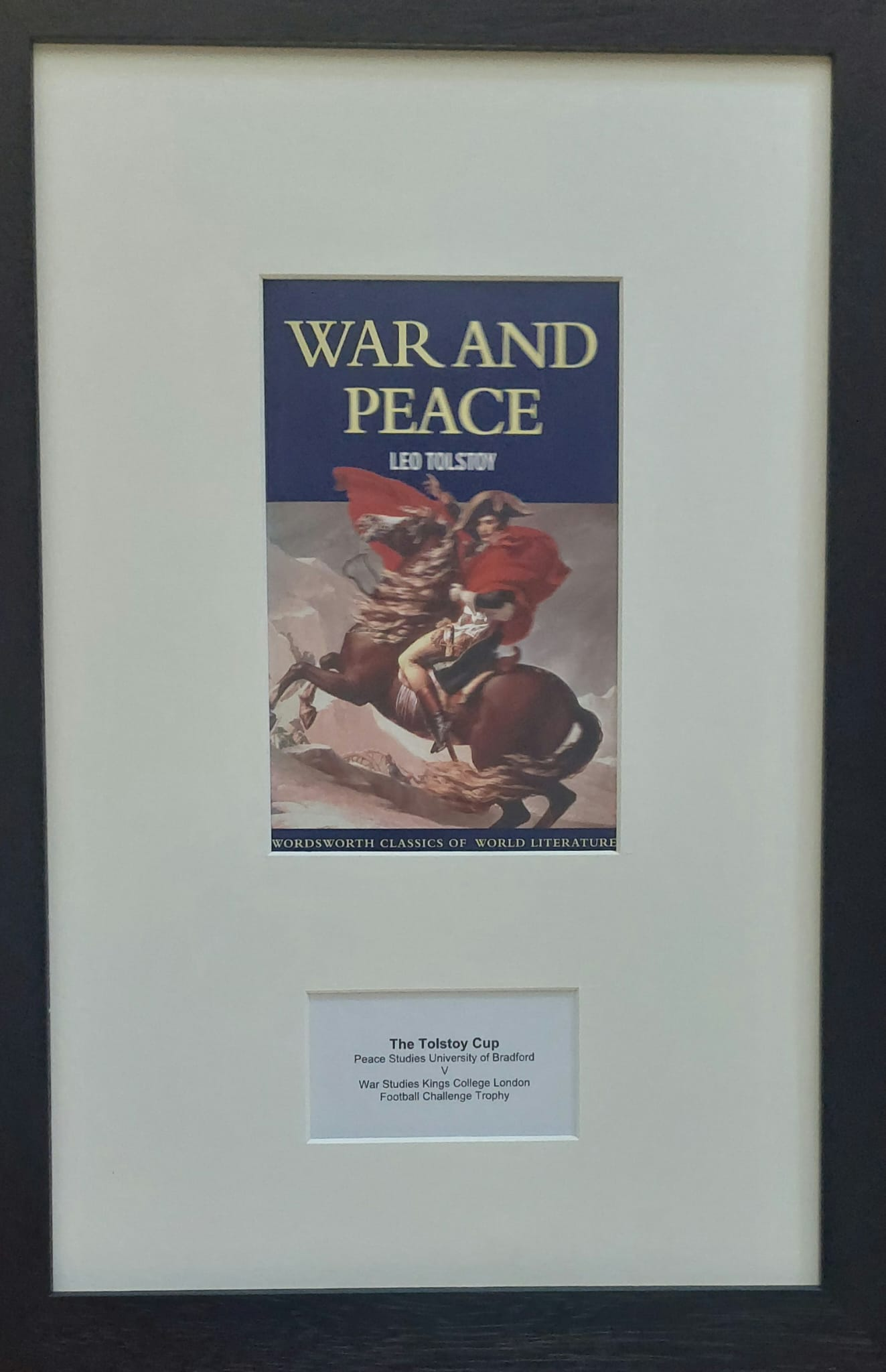
- Tolstoy Cup Trophy
- Sport: Football
- Location: England
- Teams: Peace Studies, University of Bradford; War Studies, University College of London
- First meeting: 1992
- Latest meeting: 2024
- Trophy: Framed copy of Tolstoy’s novel, War and Peace

Statistics
- Most wins: Peace Studies
- Largest victory: Peace Studies 15-0, 1994
- Longest unbeaten streak: Peace Studies, 1992 - 2008

The Tolstoy Cup is a football match played between the students of the Department of Peace Studies at the University of Bradford and the Department of War Studies at King's College London. The first match was played in 1992 and succeeding games came at intermittent intervals until 2007, when the event became an annual one. Following a six year hiatus, largely due to the covid-19 virus, the fixture was replayed on 9 June 2024 as part of the Peace Studies Golden Jubilee Conference at the University of Bradford.

The competition is named after War and Peace, the 1869 novel written by the Russian author Leo Tolstoy.

== Rivalry ==
The rivalry between "Peace Studies" and "War Studies" is one of the great sporting rivalries, being featured at number four on the Financial Times list of "Great college sports rivalries". Although it does not match the history or tradition of university rivalries such as the Oxford and Cambridge Boat Race, the competition is still often covered by the national media including the BBC, The Independent and Bradford's Telegraph and Argus. The second leg of the 2007 match played at Bradford City's Valley Parade attracted over 200 spectators.

== Symbolism ==
Symbolically, War Studies adopt a red and black stripe, while Peace Studies typically play in light blue colours. Rather than their own, both sides have at times played with the names of notable figures related to their studied disciplines on their shirts: 'D. Lama', 'M. L. King' and 'Gandhi' for Peace and 'Nelson', 'Caesar' and 'Clausewitz' for War.

== Results ==
No.	Date	Winner	Score	Venue	Total wins	
No.	Date	Winner	Score	Venue	War	Peace
1	1992	Peace Studies	2–1	Bradford	0	1
2	1994	Peace Studies	15–0	Bradford	0	2
3	2007	Peace Studies	0–1, 0–1, 1–1 agg (4–3 on penalties)	London (1st leg) Bradford (2nd leg)	0	3
4	2008	Peace Studies	1–1 (2–4 on penalties)	London	0	4
5	2009	Peace Studies	3–1	Bradford	0	5
6	2010	War Studies	2–1	London	1	5
7	2011	Peace Studies	5–0	Bradford	1	6
8	2012	Peace Studies	1–2	London	1	7
9	2014	Peace Studies	3–0	Bradford	1	8
10	2015	War Studies	4–1	London	2	8
11	2016	Peace Studies	5–1	Bradford	2	9
12	2018	War Studies	5–2	London	3	9
13	2024	Peace Studies	3–2	Bradford	3	10

== See also ==
- List of British and Irish varsity matches
