= King's College London–UCL rivalry =

English inter-university rivalry

The rivalry between King's College London and University College London is a contention between two London universities that has been persisting since the beginning of the 19th century.

== Origins ==
University College was originally founded as a secular institution intended to educate "the youth of our middling rich people between the ages of 15 or 16 and 20 or later". Its foundation was supported by the Jewish population, the Utilitarians, and non-Anglican Christians.

King's College, by contrast, was founded by royal charter for "the general education of youth in which the various branches of Literature and Science are intended to be taught, and also the doctrines and duties of Christianity [...] inculcated by the United Church of England and Ireland." Early benefactors included King George IV and then-Prime Minister the Duke of Wellington, among other eminent politicians and theologians of the British Establishment.

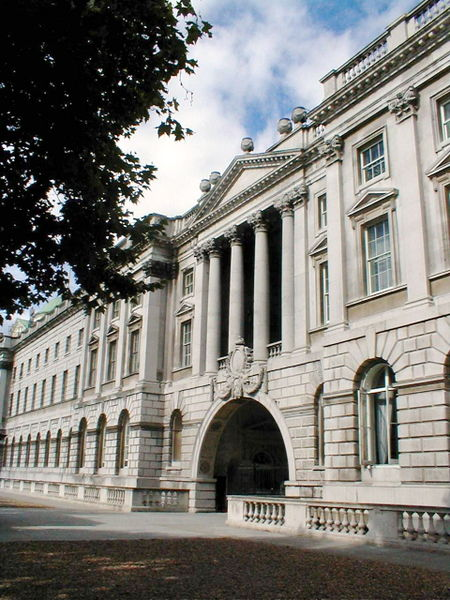
Embankment terrace, King's College London

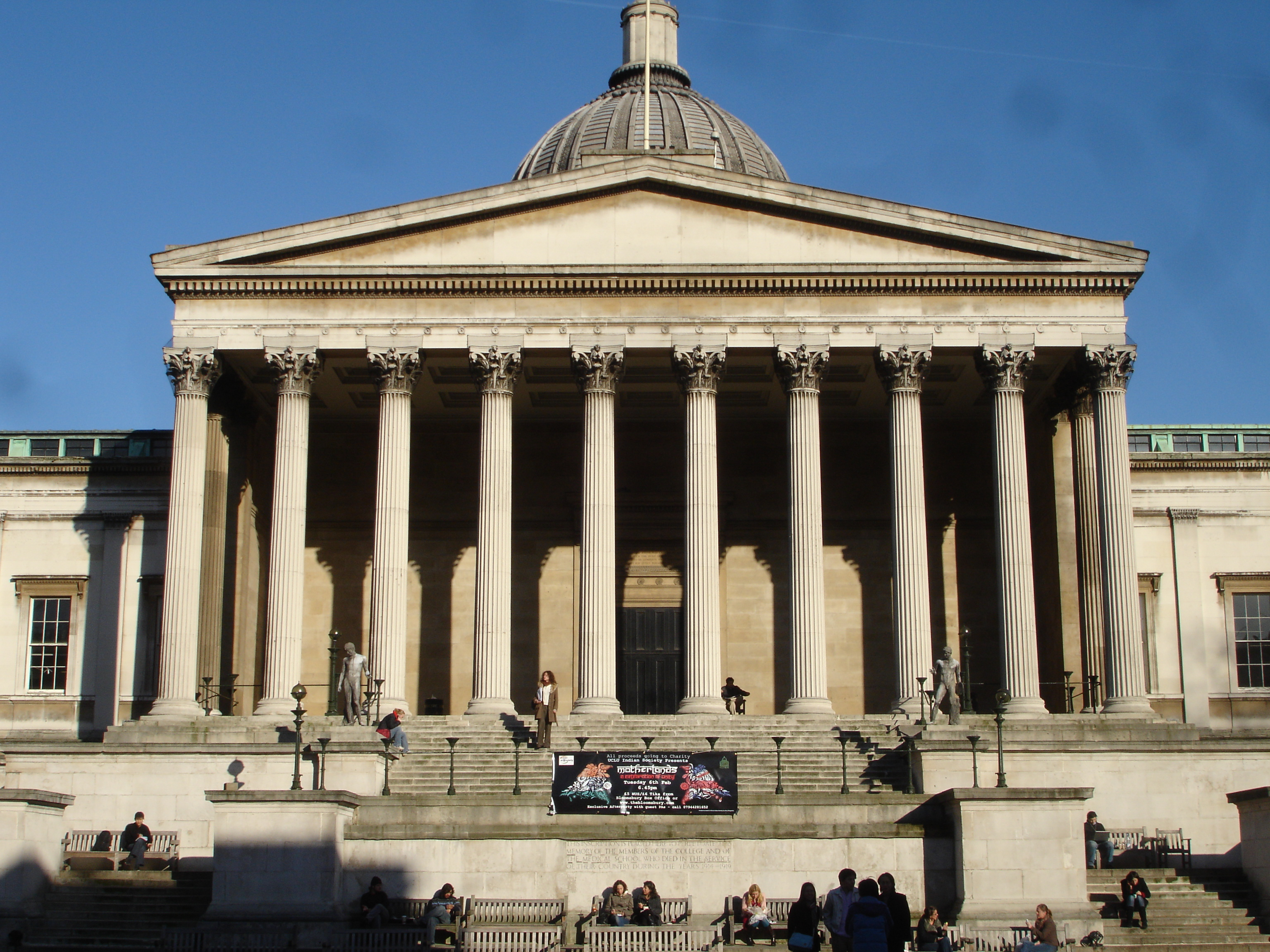
Portico building, University College London

Early in 1829, the Earl of Winchilsea publicly challenged the Duke of Wellington about the his simultaneous support for the Anglican King's College and the Roman Catholic Relief Act 1829. The result was the Wellington–Winchilsea duel at Battersea Fields on 21 March. Shots were fired but no-one was hurt. Duel Day is still celebrated annually at King's as a formal dinner and reenactment held in March.

Rivalry between the two London universities reached its height between the two World Wars, involving frequent capture of each other's mascots, and continues to this day.

== Mascot Capture ==
The mascots of both universities were frequently kidnapped by students of the other.

Since 1900, the unofficial mascot of UCL has been a large wooden highlander model named "Phineas". This mascot was kidnapped by King's students—allegedly bitter about a rugby defeat—in 1922. After a fight between groups of students that lasted more than an hour, and eventual intervention by the Metropolitan Police, the mascot was returned with a damaged arm.

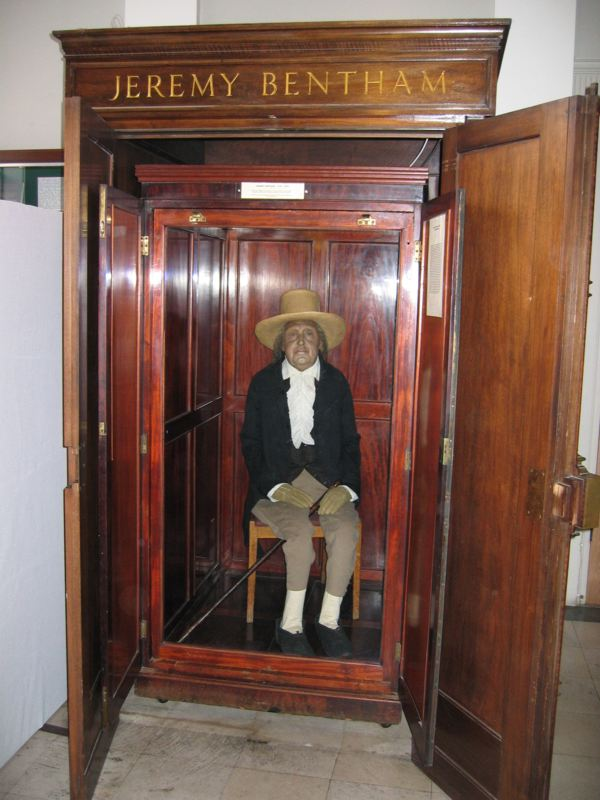
The body of Jeremy Bentham (with fake head)

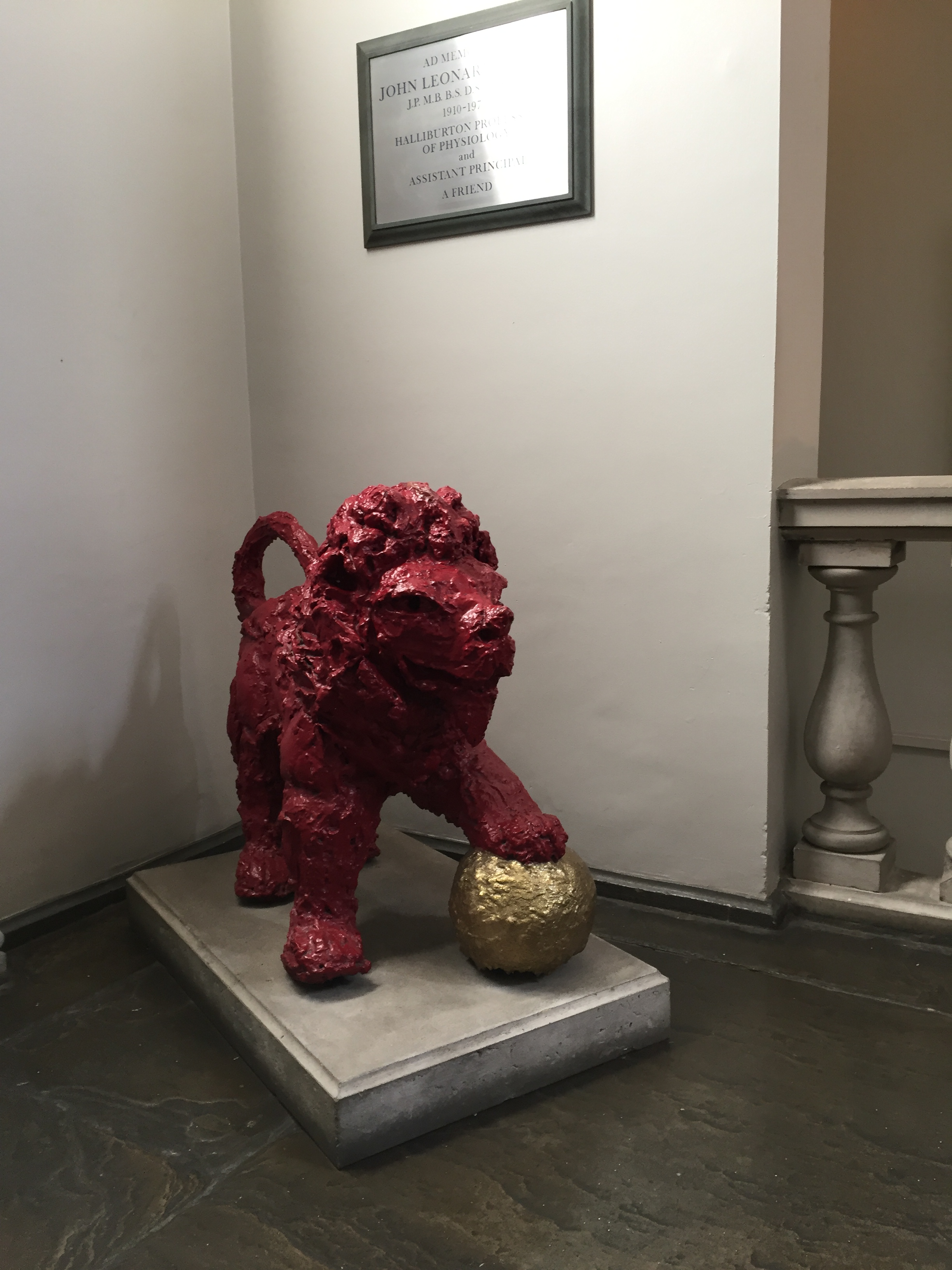
Reggie the Lion

Since 1923, the mascot of King's has been a statue of a lion named "Reggie". This mascot was captured by UCL students in 1927 and filled with rotten apples. Another kidnapping attempt by UCL students failed in that same year, leading to a brawl between groups of students. Six students were hospitalised and two arrested as a result of the incident.

Other incidents have included the tarring and feathering of Phineas and the burial of Reggie in Hampstead Heath.

In 1989, King's students stole the mummified head of Jeremy Bentham and reportedly played football with it. These students were subsequently threatened with fines and expulsion. Mascot theft has ceased since, with both universities' mascots under secure protection.

== See also ==
- College rivalry
