= Stan Calvert Cup =

- Status: defunct
- Date: March
- Frequency: Annually
- Locations: Newcastle upon Tyne and Gateshead, Tyne and Wear, UK
- Inaugurated: 1994
- Most recent: 2018
- Participants: Newcastle University; Northumbria University
- Website: stancalvert.co.uk
- Northumbria University (current holder)

The Stan Calvert Cup, formally known as the Stan Calvert Memorial Cup, was an annual varsity contest that took place in Newcastle upon Tyne between the universities of Newcastle and Northumbria originally in December and February, later moving March. The annual cup ran from 1994 to 2018, before being officially cancelled at the start of the 2018 academic year when Newcastle made the decision to withdraw from the competition.

== The competition ==
It was named after Alnwick-born Stan Calvert, who was Newcastle University's first Director of Sport from 1981, having been involved with sport at the university since the early 1960s.

The competition did not take place in a single sporting event but rather over 1,200 competitors in more than 70 teams compete against each other in 26 different sports, the winning university is determined by whose team won the most events. The competition took place every year since its formation in 1994 until its cancellation in 2018. The rules that determined the nature of the competition were signed by both universities in 2009.

== Previous winners ==
Between 1994 and 2018, Newcastle University won the cup 13 times and Northumbria 10 times, with 2 draws. In 2013 Newcastle retained the cup for an unprecedented 6th consecutive year, but Northumbria University regained it in 2014, and retained it until the competition's final year in 2018.

Year	Winner
2018	Northumbria
2017	Northumbria
2016	Northumbria
2015	Northumbria
2014	Northumbria
2013	Newcastle
2012	Newcastle
2011	Newcastle
2010	Newcastle
2009	Newcastle
2008	Newcastle
2007	Northumbria
2006	Newcastle
2005	Northumbria
2004	Newcastle
2003	Draw
2002	Newcastle
2001	Newcastle
2000	Northumbria
1999	Draw
1998	Newcastle
1997	Newcastle
1996	Northumbria
1995	Newcastle
1994	Northumbria

== See also ==
- List of British and Irish varsity matches
