= List of British and Irish varsity matches =

A varsity match in Britain and Ireland is a fixture, especially of a sporting event or team, between university teams, usually the highest-level team, or varsity team, in that sport.

The longest-running series of varsity matches in the world is between the University of Oxford and the University of Cambridge, a key feature of Oxford–Cambridge rivalry. The University Match in cricket, first played in 1827, is the oldest varsity match in the world. (Note: The oldest sporting rivalry between two schools is the Eton v Harrow cricket match, which first took place in 1805.) The Boat Race followed, beginning in 1829. The first Inter-‘Varsity Sports, also called the Cambridge and Oxford Athletic Games, in track and field was held in 1864, pioneering modern athletic competition. The Oxford v Cambridge women's University Match in (field) hockey was first played in 1895, making it the oldest women's varsity match in the world. Varsity matches held between Oxford and Cambridge influenced the development of college sports in the United States, and other countries around the world.

The Scottish Varsity match in rugby union between the University of St Andrews and the University of Edinburgh, dating to the 1860s, is the oldest varsity match in the world in a code of football. (Note: The Oxford-Cambridge varsity matches in rugby union and association football were first held in 1872 and 1874 respectively although intercollegiate matches in association football date back earlier. The 1869 Princeton vs. Rutgers football game was the first intercollegiate football (soccer) game in the United States while the first intercollegiate rugby football game in the United States took place in 1874 when Harvard University played against McGill University.) The Scottish Boat Race between the University of Glasgow and the University of Edinburgh was first held in 1877. The Christie Cup between the universities of Leeds, Liverpool and Manchester in numerous sports has been held since 1886.

Since the middle of the 20th century, a number of city and regional sporting rivalries developed between universities, which are also dubbed varsity matches. Unlike the Oxford–Cambridge matches, which are stand alone events in each sport, some of the more recent varsity competitions are multi-sport varsity competitions. The Roses Tournament between the universities of York and Lancaster is one of the oldest and largest of these, dating back to 1965. It is frequently referred to as the largest inter-university sports tournament in Europe.

Most inter-university sport in Britain is now governed and organised by British Universities and Colleges Sport, alongside Scottish Student Sport, and in Ireland by Student Sport Ireland.

== Varsity in England ==
=== Interregional rivalries ===
- Anglia Ruskin University v University of East London
  - Challenge Cup
- University of Bath v Cardiff Metropolitan University (Wales)
  - Varsity
- Bath Spa University v University of Winchester
  - Varsity
- Bradford University v King's College London
  - The Tolstoy Cup (since 1992)
- Camborne School of Mines v Royal School of Mines
  - The Bottle Match (since 1902)
- University of Cambridge v University of Oxford
  - Comprises more than 60 events across various sports, including the following, which were established in the 19th or early 20th centuries:
    - The University Match (since 1827) – cricket
    - The Boat Race (since 1829) and the Women's Boat Race (since 1927) – rowing
    - Athletics (since 1864) – pioneered modern athletic competition
    - Football Varsity (since 1874) – association football, developed from the Cambridge rules
    - University Golf Match (since 1878)
    - The Varsity Polo Match (since 1878)
    - The Varsity Match (since 1872) – rugby union, recognised in the World Rugby Hall of Fame
    - Inter-Varsity Cross-Country Race (since 1880)
    - Ice Hockey Varsity Match (since 1885) – said to be the world's oldest rivalry in ice hockey
    - University Hockey Match (since 1890 for men and 1895 for women) – apparently the first women's varsity match in the world
    - Varsity Match in water polo (since 1891) – reportedly the world's oldest competition in water polo
    - Swimming Varsity Match (since 1892 and 1921 for women) – claimed to be the world's oldest annual swimming competition
    - Boxing and fencing (since 1897) – the former is described as the longest-running inter-club amateur boxing fixture in the world
    - The Varsity Game (since 1921) – basketball
    - Varsity Trip (since 1922) – skiing
    - Blues Squash Varsity Match (since 1925)
- Durham University v Loughborough University
  - BUCS Varsity or D-Day (Durham Day)
  - Intramural Varsity (Durham colleges v Loughborough intramural sports)
- Durham University v University of York
  - College Varsity – between Durham colleges and York Colleges, started 2014 as a replacement for the White Rose Varsity
  - James – Collingwood tournament annually between James College, York and Collingwood College, Durham since 2009.
  - Josephine Butler – Langwith varsity: Annual home-and-away (York in the autumn, Durham in the summer) tournaments between Josephine Butler College, Durham and Langwith College, York held since 2013.
- Kingston University v University of Surrey
  - Varsity (2010 to 2016) – replaced by two regional rivalries: Kingston v City and Surrey v Royal Holloway
- Lancaster University v University of York
  - The Roses Tournament (since 1965) – multi-sport varsity competition
- University of Leeds v University of Liverpool v University of Manchester
  - The Christie Cup (since 1886)
- Leeds Beckett University v Manchester Metropolitan University
  - Battle of the North
- University of Sunderland v York St John University
  - Varsity

=== Regional rivalries ===
==== East ====
- University of East Anglia v University of Essex
  - Derby Day

==== London ====
- King's College London v University College London
  - London Varsity Series – multiple sports over 8 days, culminating in the London Varsity rugby match
- London School of Economics v Imperial College London
  - The City Varsity – men's and women's rugby
- Brunel University v St Mary's University, Twickenham
  - West London Varsity – rugby, football, basketball, netball and cricket
- City, University of London v Kingston University London
  - Varsity
- University of East London v Middlesex University
  - Varsity – replaced by UEL v Anglia Ruskin Challenge Cup from 2016
- Goldsmiths, University of London v University of the Arts London
  - The Arts Cup – basketball, football, hockey, netball and rugby
- Imperial College London v Imperial College School of Medicine
  - VarsityFest – rugby, hockey, netball, football, lacrosse, basketball, tennis
- King's College London v King's College London School of Medicine
  - The Macadam Cup (since 2004) – swimming gala, water polo, badminton, squash, hockey (men and women), mixed fencing, mixed tennis, ultimate frisbee, rugby (men and women), netball, lacrosse, football (men and women) and darts
- University of London Colleges and Imperial College School of Medicine
  - Allom Cup (since 1949) – Rowing
- Queen Mary, University of London v Queen Mary, University of London, Barts and The London School of Medicine and Dentistry
  - The Merger Cup (since 1995) – rugby, football, hockey, rowing, tennis, badminton, netball, squash, and basketball
- University of West London v University of Westminster
  - West London Varsity

==== Midlands ====
- Aston University v Birmingham City University
  - Varsity
- University of Birmingham v University of Birmingham Medics
  - Brum Rugby Varsity
- University of Birmingham v University of Warwick
  - Varsity Boat Race (2006 and 2012)
- Coventry University v University of Warwick
  - Varsity
- Derby University v University of Hertfordshire
  - Varsity
- De Montfort University v University of Leicester
  - Varsity
- Keele University v Staffordshire University
  - Varsity (from 2001)
- Loughborough University v University of Nottingham
  - IMS Varsity – between intramural sports teams
- University of Nottingham v Nottingham Trent University
  - Nottingham Varsity (since 2004)

==== North East ====
- Durham University v Newcastle University
  - The Boat Race of the North – rowing (since 1997)
- Newcastle University v Northumbria University
  - The Stan Calvert Cup (1994 – 2018)
- University of Sunderland v University of Teesside
  - Varsity

==== North West ====
- University of Central Lancashire v Edge Hill University
  - Varsity
- University of Chester v Salford University
  - Varsity (since 2016)
- University of Liverpool v Liverpool John Moores University
  - Liverpool Varsity
- University of Manchester v Manchester Metropolitan University
  - Varsity
- University of Manchester v University of Salford
  - The Two Cities Rugby League Challenge
  - The Two Cities Boat Race (since 1972) – rowing

==== South East ====
- University of Bedfordshire v University of Northampton
  - Varsity
- University of Bournemouth v Southampton Solent University
  - Varsity
- University of Brighton v University of Sussex
  - Varsity
- Buckinghamshire New University v University of Roehampton
  - Varsity
- Canterbury Christ Church University v University of Kent
  - Canterbury Varsity
- University of Chichester v University of Winchester
  - Varsity
- Oxford Brookes University v University of Reading
  - Varsity
- University of Portsmouth v University of Southampton
  - Varsity Cup
- Royal Holloway, University of London v University of Surrey
  - Varsity

==== South West ====
- University of Bath v University of Exeter
  - Rugby Varsity
- University of Bristol v University of West England
  - Bristol Boat Race
  - Varsity
- University of Plymouth v University of St Mark & St John
  - Varsity
- University of Worcester v University of Gloucestershire
  - Varsity

==== Yorkshire and the Humber ====
- University of Bradford v University of Huddersfield
- University of Hull v University of Teesside v York St. John University
  - The Tri-Varsity (ended 2008)
- University of Hull v University of Lincoln
  - The Humber Games – inaugurated in 2014 after Hull's annual series with York ended in acrimony in 2013.
- University of Hull v University of York
  - The White Rose Varsity Tournament (contested from 2005 to 2011 between York and York St John University) was a short-lived series established in 2011. It was discontinued in 2013 due to disagreements between the two universities.
- University of Leeds v Leeds Beckett University
  - Leeds Varsity
- University of Sheffield v Sheffield Hallam University
  - Sheffield Varsity (since 1997) – the largest ice hockey varsity match outside of North America, with the event reaching stadium capacity of 9,300 for the 2025 series.
- University of York v York St. John University
  - White Rose Varsity Tournament (2005 – 2011)

== Varsity in Ireland ==
- Queen's University Belfast v Ulster University
  - Queen's v Ulster Varsity (rugby union reestablished in 2016 as "RugbyFest"; multi-sport since 2025)
- University College Dublin v Trinity College Dublin
  - Colours Boat Races (since 1947) – rowing
  - The Colours Match (since 1952) – rugby union

== Varsity in Scotland ==
- University of Aberdeen v Robert Gordon University
  - Granite City Challenge (since 1996)
  - Aberdeen Universities Boat Race (since 1995) – rowing
- University of Abertay Dundee v University of Dundee
  - The Tay Games Varsity Challenge
- University of Edinburgh v Heriot-Watt University
  - Varsity Quaich – men's football, men's and women's hockey, men's rugby and rowing
- University of St Andrews v University of Edinburgh
  - The Scottish Varsity (since 1860s) – rugby union
  - The Johnny Wookey Memorial Varsity – ice hockey
- University of Stirling v University of Dundee
  - Tayforth Boat Race
- University of Edinburgh v University of Glasgow
  - The Scottish Boat Race (first held in 1877) – rowing
- University of the West of Scotland v Edinburgh Napier University
  - East v West Varsity – men's American football, mixed badminton, men's basketball, men's and women's hockey, men's rugby
- University of the West of Scotland v Scottish Rural College v Ayrshire College
  - West Coast Varsity

== Varsity in Wales ==
- Aberystwyth University v Bangor University
  - Aberystwyth-Bangor Varsity
- Cardiff University v Swansea University
  - Varsity Shield in over 30 events, including:
    - Welsh Varsity (since 1997) – rugby
    - The Welsh Boat Race (since 2006) – rowing
- Cardiff Metropolitan University v University of Bath (England)
  - Varsity

== See also ==
- Sport in Ireland
- Sport in the United Kingdom
- Universities in the United Kingdom
- Universities in Ireland
- University and college rivalry
- University and college sport
- University rowing in the United Kingdom
