= University Match (hockey) =

The University Match (hockey) is the annual field hockey fixture between Cambridge University and Oxford University. The Men's fixture was first contested in 1890. The Women's University Match in hockey first took place in 1895, making it the oldest varsity match in the world for women.

== History ==
Both Men & Women have played 125 times.

In 2002, both fixtures were played on the same date for the first time.

The contest has taken place at Southgate Hockey Club since 2003, prior to which the game took place at a variety of venues across the UK.

The annual contest between the University's second, third & fourth teams takes place in February, alternating venue between Oxford's Iffley Road Pitch and Cambridge's recently re-laid Wilberforce Road Pitch.

The 2025 Men's fixture was won 3-0 by Cambridge.

The 2025 Women's fixture was won on shuffles by Oxford, after the match finished 0-0.

The 2026 fixture is to take place at Southgate Hockey Club on Sunday 1 March 2026

The match is currently sponsored by JMAN Group, a leading management consultancy.

== Results ==
Cambridge hold the men's title, with Oxford holding the women's title. The results were 3-0 and 0-0 (after shuffles) respectively in 2025.

Cambridge last won both fixtures in 2020 and Oxford in 2022.

In the last decade, shuffles have decided matches that are level at the end of normal playing time.

Similar to a football penalty shoot out, shuffles gives 5 players from each team a period of eight seconds to beat the keeper when starting from the 23 yard line.

Cambridge have won on shuffles four times (Men in 2015, 2021 and 2023 Women in 2020).

Oxford Men won on shuffles in 2017 and Oxford Women won on shuffles in 2025

=== Women ===
Cambridge – 52 wins

Oxford – 49 wins

Drawn – 24

=== Men ===
Cambridge – 58 wins

Oxford – 49 wins

Drawn – 18

=== Goals ===
Cambridge: 241

Oxford: 232

== See also ==
- List of British and Irish varsity matches
- Oxford–Cambridge rivalry
