= The Scottish Varsity =

Rugby union fixture

- Teams: St Andrews RFC; Edinburgh RFC
- First meeting: 1860s

The Scottish Varsity is an annual rugby union fixture between the University of St Andrews and the University of Edinburgh in Scotland. In the Men's match, as of 2026, St Andrews have eight victories which leads Edinburgh's seven since the revival of the match in 2011. First played in the 1860s, it is the oldest varsity match in the world in a code of football. (Note: The University Match and The Boat Race were first held in 1827 and 1829 respectively and are also varsity matches. The Cambridge and Oxford Athletic Games were first held in 1864. However, the Oxford-Cambridge varsity matches in rugby union and association football were first held in 1872 and 1874 respectively although college matches in association football date back earlier. The 1869 Princeton vs. Rutgers football game was the first intercollegiate football game in the United States while the first intercollegiate rugby football game in the United States took place in 1874 when Harvard University played against McGill University.)

== History ==
Edinburgh University RFC was founded in 1857 and the University of St Andrews Rugby Football Club the following year. Fixtures began in the 1860s, making this the oldest varsity match in the world in a code of football. (Note: The University Match and The Boat Race were first held in 1827 and 1829 respectively and are also varsity matches. The Cambridge and Oxford Athletic Games were first held in 1864. However, the Oxford-Cambridge varsity matches in rugby union and association football were first held in 1872 and 1874 respectively although intercollegiate matches in association football date back earlier. The 1869 Princeton vs. Rutgers football game was the first intercollegiate football game in the United States while the first intercollegiate rugby football game in the United States took place in 1874 when Harvard University played against McGill University.)

In 1873, the University of St Andrews RFC and the Edinburgh University RFC, along with six other clubs, were foundering members of the Scottish Football Union (now, Scottish Rugby Union). Edinburgh University had joined the Rugby Football Union in 1871 and renounced their membership to join the SFU.

The Scottish Varsity was resurrected in 2011 after a hiatus of over 50 years and was staged in London at the home of London Scottish RFC in order to build alumni relations. In 2015, the match returned to Scotland in Murrayfield Stadium and drew a crowd of over 10,000 spectators. In 2021, the match was played at University Park, the home of University of St Andrews RFC, due to Covid-19 pandemic crowd restrictions. The match is normally held in late September and has received coverage from Sky Sports, the BBC and IRB’s Total Rugby.

The match has been named after its sponsor, The Royal Bank of Scotland, since 2015, and has enjoyed popular support since the rivalry was renewed in 2011.

== Men's Results ==
Varsity matches were initially held on St. Andrew's Day but have been moved earlier to late September, they have attracted notable attendees including her Royal Highness Princess Anne in 2012.

No.	Date	Venue	Score	Winner
1	30 November 2011	Richmond Athletic Ground, London	32 – 0	Edinburgh
2	30 November 2012	Richmond Athletic Ground, London	28 – 8	Edinburgh
3	28 September 2013	Richmond Athletic Ground, London	24 – 15	St Andrews
4	27 September 2014	Richmond Athletic Ground, London	17 – 12	St Andrews
5	26 September 2015	Murrayfield Stadium, Edinburgh	27 – 26	St Andrews
6	24 September 2016	Murrayfield Stadium, Edinburgh	24 – 12	St Andrews
7	23 September 2017	Murrayfield Stadium, Edinburgh	31 – 7	Edinburgh
8	22 September 2018	Murrayfield Stadium, Edinburgh	26 – 15	Edinburgh
9	21 September 2019	Murrayfield Stadium, Edinburgh	62 – 0	Edinburgh
10	25 September 2021	University Park, St Andrews	18 – 5	St Andrews
11	24 September 2022	Peffermill, Edinburgh	24 – 14	St Andrews
12	23 September 2023	University Park, St Andrews	32 – 29	Edinburgh
13	21 September 2024	Edinburgh Rugby Stadium, Edinburgh	24 – 13	St Andrews
14	20 September 2025	Edinburgh Rugby Stadium, Edinburgh	26 – 23	Edinburgh
15	18 September 2026	Edinburgh Rugby Stadium, Edinburgh	21 - 12	St Andrews

=== By total wins (Men's) ===
Total matches	St Andrews victories	Edinburgh victories	Draws
15	8	7	0

== Women's Results ==
In 2014, the inaugural Women's Varsity Match took place in the form of a 7-a-side match; it continued to take place as a 15-a-side match until 2019. Edinburgh won all six matches played between 2014 and 2019.

No.	Date	Venue	Score	Winner
1	27 September 2014	Richmond Athletic Ground, London	24 – 0	Edinburgh
2	26 September 2015	Murrayfield Stadium, Edinburgh	36 – 7	Edinburgh
3	24 September 2016	Murrayfield Stadium, Edinburgh	97 – 0	Edinburgh
4	23 September 2017	Murrayfield Stadium, Edinburgh	53 – 5	Edinburgh
5	22 September 2018	Murrayfield Stadium, Edinburgh	49 – 0	Edinburgh
6	21 September 2019	Murrayfield Stadium, Edinburgh	52 – 0	Edinburgh

=== By total wins (Women's) ===
Total matches	St Andrews victories	Edinburgh victories	Draws
6	0	6	0

== See also ==
- List of British and Irish varsity matches
- The Varsity Match
