= Oxford–Cambridge rivalry =

Rivalry between the University of Oxford and the University of Cambridge

Oxford-Cambridge rivalry dates back to their founding in the 13th century, the oldest rivalry of any current universities in the world. (Note: See the list of oldest universities in continuous operation.) During most of that time, they were the only two universities in England and two of the most prestigious in any country, generating an intense rivalry that is one of the most enduring and well-known in the world.

They compete with each other for academic talent, having produced a large number of Britain's most prominent scientists, writers, and politicians, as well as noted figures in many other fields.

Sporting rivalry between the two universities, including varsity matches held between Oxford and Cambridge influenced the development of college rivalry and college sports in the United States and other countries around the world.

== Background ==
The University of Oxford, with teaching recorded as early as 1096, is the oldest university in the English-speaking world. The University of Cambridge was founded in 1209 by a group of scholars who left Oxford to take refuge from hostile townsmen in Oxford. Sometimes collectively known as Oxbridge, they are the two oldest universities in England and two of the oldest universities in the world.

== Academic ==
Rivalry between Oxford and Cambridge in academic reputation has been prominent for much of their history. They have produced a large number of Britain's most prominent scientists, writers, and politicians, as well as noted figures in many other fields.

In modern times, more politicians have come from Oxford University than Cambridge, in part because Oxford offers a particularly suitable undergraduate course (Philosophy, Politics and Economics, or PPE) sometimes nicknamed the 'MP's degree'.

In 2000, Cambridge academics said the Rhodes Scholarships gave its rival, Oxford, an advantage through a higher profile in the United States.

In the 21st century, both universities are consistently ranked among the top institutions globally, with a competitive environment in terms of admissions, research, and academic prestige.

== Sport ==
Sports were assimilated into academic life at Cambridge and Oxford universities in the nineteenth century and became a feature of Oxford–Cambridge rivalry. Rivalry spilled over into multiple varsity matches held between Oxford and Cambridge. These matches were often among the first events in their sports in the world and often the first events at university level and influenced the development of college sports in the United States and other countries around the world.

Two annual competitions between Oxford and Cambridge are the oldest university-level intercollegiate sporting competitions in the world: The University Match in cricket, which was first held in 1827; and The Boat Race, which was first contested in 1829 and pits Cambridge University Boat Club against their Oxford counterparts over a 4 mile (6 km) stretch of the River Thames. (Note: The oldest sporting rivalry between two schools is the Eton v Harrow cricket match, which first took place in 1805.) The Oxford vs Cambridge women's University Match in (field) hockey was first played in 1895, making it the oldest women's varsity match in the world.

The other major Oxbridge sporting competitions are the Rugby Union and Rugby League Varsity Match, the former being a rugby union game played annually. There have been 142 men's matches played. The first women's match was played in 1988. The Rugby Football Union chose to advertise the 2006 match with a campaign promoting inter-university rivalry: their advertising agency Lowe London produced posters showing the number of Prime Ministers produced by the universities (Oxford 26 – Cambridge 14), with the tagline "It's time to get even". The Rugby League Varsity Match is a rugby league game played annually. Whilst not having the history of its Union counterpart, the fixture has been contested for over 30 years, and is broadcast live on Sky Sports.

The Boat Race and the rugby Varsity Matches are notable in the UK in that they are the only university sports events that have any public profile outside the universities themselves; all three are screened live on national television and are widely covered in the national media.

All other significant sports have their own varsity match; some of these, including the Ice Hockey Varsity Match, University Golf Match and the Varsity Polo Match attracted significant attention in the past. The results of all the varsity matches in The Varsity Games are aggregated and each year one university wins the Varsity Games title. Sportspersons who have competed at a Varsity Match in the prestigious Full Blue sports are eligible for an Oxford Blue or Cambridge Blue respectively.

At direct sporting competitions the rivalry can be heard in the customary insults used by members of each University. 'Shoe the Tabs', derived from Cantabridgian, is traditionally used by those from Oxford. Likewise, 'GDBO', or God Damn Bloody Oxford, is the response from Cambridge.

During the first half of the 20th century sport played part in university life both as an activity for students and as an influence on the image of the universities from the outside world. However, during the 1950s, university dons at Oxford became critical of the time spent by students on sport. Undergraduates at the university also began to criticise the public school tradition of worship of team and competitive sports, which dated from the 19th century; this criticism intensified during the period of student radicalism in the late 1960s.

== Social ==
Beyond academics and sport, the rivalry extends to the social standing of the universities and their members, creating social traditions and culture that have shaped their identities for centuries.

== Co-operation ==
Despite the impassioned rivalry between the two universities, there is also much cooperation when the need arises. Most Oxford colleges have a sister college in Cambridge. Some Oxford and Cambridge colleges with the same or similar names are 'sisters': for example, Jesus College, Cambridge, and Jesus College, Oxford, or Magdalen College, Oxford and Magdalene College, Cambridge. However, namesakes are not always paired up: for example, St John's College, Oxford, is the sister college of Sidney Sussex College, Cambridge, while St John's College, Cambridge, is the sister college of Balliol College, Oxford. Arrangements between sister colleges vary, but may include reciprocal offers of accommodation to students from the other university when they are visiting. Furthermore, a significant proportion of academic staff has at some point been a member of the "other place".

Concerns are often raised that Oxford and Cambridge do not project a socially inclusive image to potential applicants from state schools, and thus Oxbridge students are disproportionately from wealthy backgrounds. The two universities have made individual and combined efforts in recent years to promote themselves to potential applicants from disadvantaged backgrounds. Each year, the Universities spend around £8 million on access schemes, and there is a designated Access Officer in every JCR and students' union.

Graduates of both universities are eligible for membership of the Oxford and Cambridge Club, a private members' club in London.

== See also ==
- Golden triangle (universities)
- King's College London–UCL rivalry
- List of British and Irish varsity matches
- The London Varsity
- Russell Group
- University and college rivalry
