= Thomas Nunneley =

British surgeon and writer

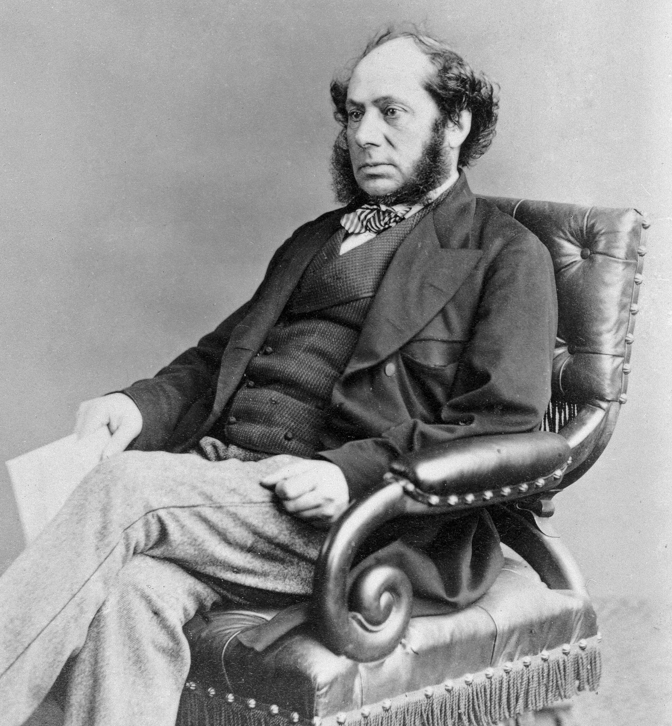
- Thomas Nunneley, photographed by Ernest Edwards
- Born: 1809
- Died: 1 June 1870 (aged 60–61)
- Known for: Eye and ear surgery; Witness in the trial of William Palmer
- Medical career
- Institutions: Guy's Hospital; Leeds Infirmary; Leeds School of Medicine

Thomas Nunneley (1809 - 1 June 1870), was a British surgeon who at first focussed on eye and ear surgery, and built a large private practice in this field. He wrote several essays and books including on topics of erysipelas, eye surgery and on the effects of anaesthesia and hydrocyanic acid.

After studying in Paris he settled in Leeds, where he became attached to the Eye and Ear Infirmary and the Leeds School of Medicine, where he taught surgery and anatomy. In 1864 he became surgeon to the Leeds Infirmary. He opposed Joseph Lister's antisepsis and did not believe in the germ-theory of wound infections. He served as a witness in civil and criminal cases, including being first witness in the trial of William Palmer.

== Early life and family ==
Thomas Nunneley was born in 1809, in Market Harborough.

== Career ==
Nunneley became apprentice to a surgeon at Wellingborough and gained surgical experience at Guy's Hospital where he served as dresser to a Mr Keys. In 1832 he gained a licenciate of the Apothecaries. After studying in Paris he settled in Leeds, where he became attached to the Eye and Ear Infirmary and the Leeds School of Medicine, where he taught surgery and anatomy.

Early in his surgical career he focussed on eye and ear surgery, and built a large private practice in this field. His first essay on erysipelas was published in 1831 and won the prize from the Junior Physiological Society of Guy's but was rejected for the Fothergillian medal in 1841. He published The Organs of Vision, their Anatomy and Physiology in 1858. Other works included the essay "The Effects produced by Hydrocyanic Acid on Animal Life; with an attempt to determine the real value of presumed antidotes and remedies" and "On Anaesthesia and other Anaesthetic Substances; being an experimental inquiryinto their nature, properties, and actions, and their comparative value and danger, and the best means of counteracting an overdose". He published his last essay "On the Effect of the Calabar Bean on the Animal Economy" in 1863. His papers "On Aneurism of the Eyeball" and "Vascular Protrusion of the Eyeball" appeared in the Medico-Chirurgical transactions.

In 1864 he became surgeon to the Leeds Infirmary. He regularly contributed to the British Medical Journal and wrote several texts. He was one of the first to perform the operation of excising the tongue. In 1869 at the meeting of the British Medical Association in Leeds, he made clear his opposition to Joseph Lister's antisepsis and disbelief in the germ-theory of wound infections.

In 1843, he became one of the original 300 Fellows of the Royal College of Surgeons.

== Trial of William Palmer ==
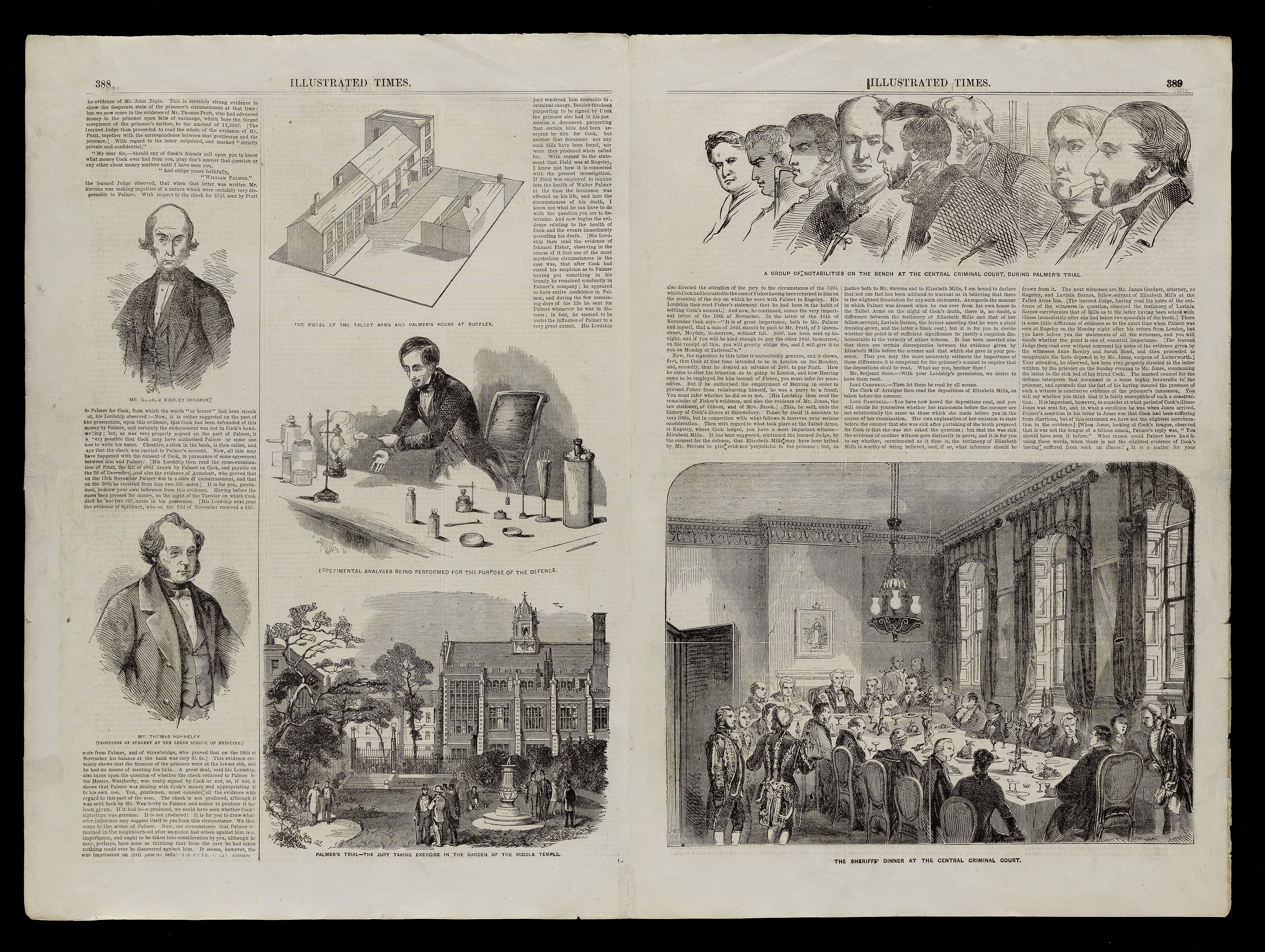
Trial of William Palmer, Illustrated Times, 1856

He served as a witness in civil and criminal cases. He was the first witness in the trial of William Palmer, He presented his opinion on the eighth day of the trial, concluding that "I am of the opinion that death was caused by some convulsive disease".

== Death ==
Nunneley died on 1 June 1870, at the age of 62.

== Selected publications ==
=== Articles ===
- Nunneley, T. (1 October 1849). "On Anæsthesia and Anæsthetic Substances Generally; Being an Experimental Inquiry into Their Nature, Properties, and Action, Their Comparative Value and Danger, and the Best Means of Counteracting the Effect of an Over-Dose". Edinburgh Medical and Surgical Journal. 72 (181): 343–395. ISSN 0963-4932. PMC 5792863. PMID 30330816.
- Nunneley, T. (1865). "On Vascular Protrusion of the Eyeball". Medico-Chirurgical Transactions. 48: 15–37. doi:10.1177/095952876504800103. ISSN 0959-5287. PMC 2147830. PMID 20896252.

=== Books ===
- A Treatise on the Nature, Causes, and Treatment of Erysipelas. E. Barrington & G. D. Haswell. 1844. OCLC 14832513.
- The Organs of Vision, their Anatomy and Physiology. New Burlington Street, London: John Churchill. 1858. OCLC 1006651356.
- On removal of the entire tongue. T. Richards. 1866. OCLC 181745443.
