= Leeds School of Medicine =

Medical school in West Yorkshire, England

School of Medicine
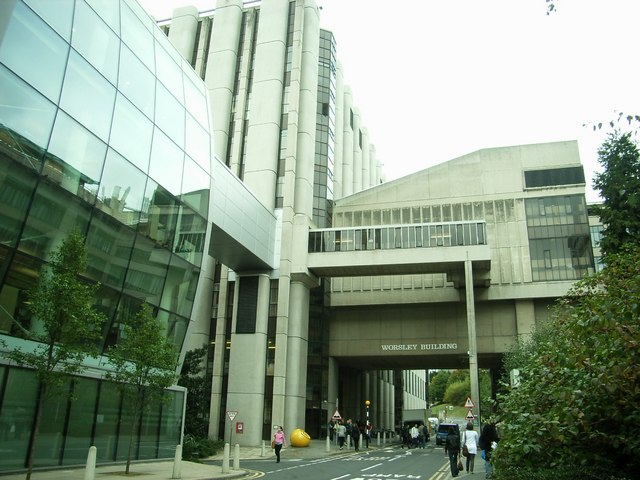
- The Worsley Building
- Type: Medical School
- Established: 1831
- Parent institution: University of Leeds
- Dean: Professor Mark Kearney
- Location: Leeds, England; 53.801°N 1.552°W
- Website: medicinehealth.leeds.ac.uk/medicine

The School of Medicine is the medical school of the University of Leeds, in the city of Leeds, West Yorkshire, England. The School of Medicine was founded in 1831.

The School of Medicine now forms part of the University's Faculty of Medicine and Health. The School is composed of institutes located at multiple sites in West Yorkshire including the Worsley Building, LIGHT, St James's Campus, and Chapel Allerton Hospital. The School of Medicine is primarily linked with two major hospitals for clinical teaching: the Leeds General Infirmary and St James's University Hospital, both run by the Leeds Teaching Hospitals NHS Trust, alongside smaller district NHS Trusts.

== History ==
On 6 June 1831 six physicians and surgeons set up the Leeds Medical School with the aim:

it is desirable that a School [of Medicine] be established in Leeds for the purposes of giving such courses of lectures on subjects connected with Medicine and Surgery as will qualify for examination at the College of Surgeons and Apothecaries' Hall.

The Medical School admitted its first students in October of that year. It was one of ten provincial medical schools founded in the ten years between 1824 and 1834.

The founders were:

- Dr James Williamson
- Dr Adam Hunter
- Mr Samuel Smith
- Mr William Hey III
- Mr Thomas Pridgin Teale
- Dr Joseph Prince Garlick

The first premises were the Leeds Public Dispensary on North Street in the town but in 1834 the school was moved to new premises at 1 East Parade. In the 1940s, the "Leeds Public Dispensary and Hospital" is recorded as sponsoring pharmaceutical research undertaken by the University of Leeds. The Medical School's current premises, the Worsley Building, was designed by the Building Design Partnership and officially opened by the Duke of Kent in March 1979.

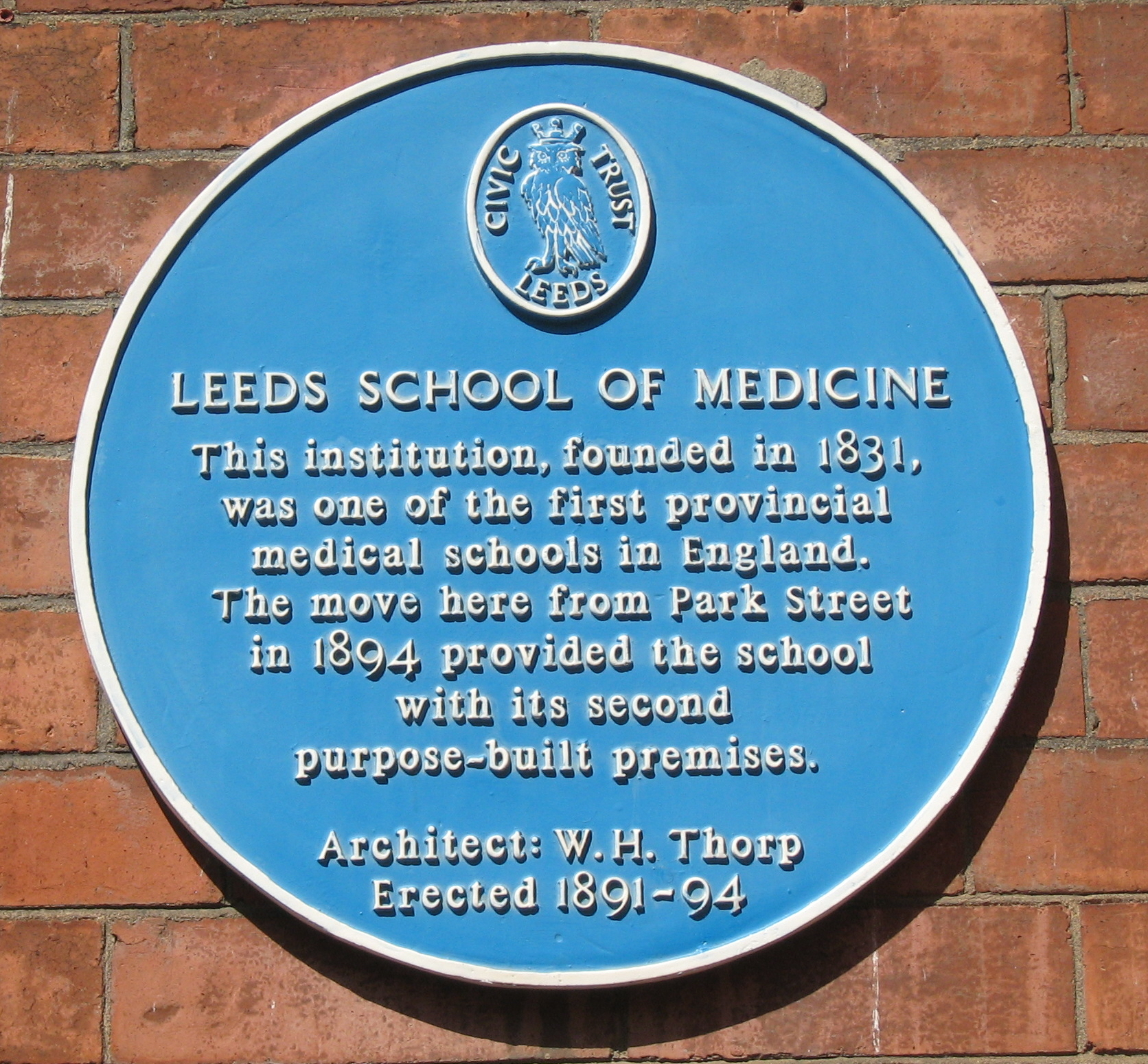
Leeds School of Medicine Blue Plaque 26 June 2018

== Teaching ==
The medical training in Leeds lasts five years. An optional intercalated degree can be taken either at Leeds or another institution, making the course six years. The MBChB degree is divided into three phases. Phase I (Preparing for Clinical Practice) encompasses Years One to Three, Phase II (Clinical Practice in Context) encompasses Year Four and Phase III (Becoming a Doctor) encompasses Year Five and Foundation Year One. Leeds was ranked 19th in the Guardian medicine league table 2017 and 3rd for student experience in the Times Higher Education Student Experience Survey 2018.

== Institutes within the School of Medicine ==
The School of Medicine is split up into five institutes:

- LIME – Leeds Institute of Medical Education – Responsible for the administration and delivery of the School of Medicine's MBChB programme.
- LIHS – Leeds Institute of Health Sciences – Includes the Nuffield Centre for International Health and Development
- LICAMM – Leeds Institute of Cardiovascular and Metabolic Medicine
- LIMR – Leeds Institute of Medical Research at St James's – based at St James's University Hospital
- LIRMM – Leeds Institute of Rheumatic and Musculoskeletal Medicine – based at Chapel Allerton Hospital

== Intercalating ==
Every year around half of all Leeds students take a year out to study another related degree (BSc) in a process called intercalating. Many medical/veterinary/dental students from other universities also come to Leeds to study. The intercalated degrees on offer include: Primary care, International Health, Medical Physics, Human Physiology, Sports Science, Neuroscience, Zoology, Pharmacology, Medical Ethics, Clinical Science, Psychology, Microbiology and Anatomy.

== Notable alumni ==
- Kamran Abbasi – Executive editor of the British Medical Journal (BMJ).
- Henry Bendelack Hewetson – Surgeon and naturalist.
- Anne Farmer – Professor of Psychiatry
- Josep Figueras
- Dr Rubina Gillani – Medical doctor and public health specialist.
- Professor Gillian Leng – British health administrator and academic.
- David Henry Lewis – Adventurer, sailor and doctor. Graduated from University of Leeds in 1942 and as a GP supported the establishment of the NHS.
- Peter McGuffin psychiatrist and geneticist
- Hugo Mascie-Taylor – Executive Medical Director
- Berkeley Moynihan – Noted British abdominal surgeon.
- William Pickles – British general practitioner and epidemiologist.
- Kathleen Rutherford – physician, philanthropist, humanitarian aid worker and peace campaigner.
- Professor Margot Shiner – Pioneer and worldwide leading figure in the field of pediatric gastroenterology and nutrition.
- Harold Shipman – General Practitioner convicted of murdering 15 of his patients; later Police found evidence that the total was closer to 250.
- Paul Workman (scientist)
- Jane Wynne – Paediatrician and expert on child abuse.
- Robert Zachary – Paediatric surgeon.
