= Leeds Dental Institute =

Hospital in West Yorkshire, England

- Leeds Teaching Hospitals NHS Trust
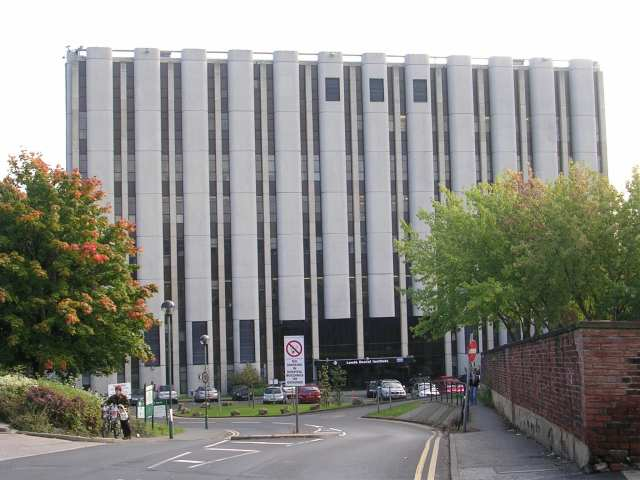
- The Worsley Building

- Shown in West Yorkshire

Geography
- Location: Worsley Building, Clarendon Way, Leeds, West Yorkshire, England
- Coordinates: 53.8033°N 1.5557°W

Organisation
- Care system: NHS

Services
- Emergency department: No

History
- Founded: 1904

Links
- Lists: Hospitals in England

Leeds Dental Institute is a dental health facility located in the Worsley Building, Clarendon Way, Leeds, West Yorkshire, England. It is jointly managed by Leeds Teaching Hospitals NHS Trust and the University of Leeds.

== History ==
The institute has its origins in the dental department of the Leeds Public Dispensary which opened in May 1904. The dental department moved to the Leeds General Infirmary in October 1920 and then to its own premises in Blundell Street in 1928. It joined the National Health Service in 1948 and then moved to the Worsley Building, which it shares with the Leeds School of Medicine, in July 1978. The Worsley Building was designed by the Building Design Partnership and officially opened by the Duke of Kent in March 1979.
