= Jane Wynne =

English paediatrician

Jane Margery Wynne FRCP
- Born: 8 December 1944
- Died: 18 June 2009 (aged 64)
- Education: Leeds Medical School
- Medical career
- Profession: physician, academic
- Field: paediatrician
- Sub-specialties: community paediatrics, child abuse

Jane Margery Wynne FRCP (8 December 1944 – 18 June 2009) was an English community paediatrician. An authority on child abuse and handicap, she lectured at the University of Leeds and ran courses teaching paediatricians to identify signs of abuse.

== Early life ==
Wynne was born in 1944 in Leicester to Margaret, a head teacher and John Wynne, a lecturer in agricultural economics. When her family moved to Leeds, she attended Lawnswood School. She went on to study at the Leeds School of Medicine receiving an MB ChB in 1969.

== Career ==
Wynne held house posts at St James's University Hospital in Leeds from 1972 to 1973. She moved to Nottingham in 1975 to train in paediatrics; in 1976, she became a senior registrar at King's College London and the Royal Alexandra Hospital for Sick Children in Brighton. She married Simon Currie, a neurologist, in 1976 and they moved together back to Leeds, where Wynne was appointed lecturer in the medical school's paediatrics department and ran a clinic for handicapped children. She began working with Michael Buchanan, a senior lecturer at the university and an expert in child abuse. She was promoted to a consultant community paediatrician at Leeds General Infirmary in 1984.

Wynne and her colleague Christopher Hobbs ran courses in Leeds that taught other paediatricians to identify signs of child abuse. They published two papers on sexual abuse in children in The Lancet in 1986 and 1987, and they founded the Child Protection Special Interest Group in 1988. Wynne and Hobbs were held partly responsible in the 1987 Cleveland child abuse scandal, since one of the involved paediatricians had attended their course in Leeds, but Elizabeth Butler-Sloss, who chaired the enquiry, ultimately voiced her support for Wynne and Hobbs' methods. They co-authored two textbooks, Child Abuse and Neglect: A Clinician's Handbook (1999) and Physical Signs of Child Abuse: A Colour Atlas (2001), and contributed a chapter to Forfar and Arneil's Textbook of Pediatrics in 2003.

Wynne was elected Fellow of the Royal College of Physicians in 1991 and was later made an honorary fellow of the Royal College of Paediatrics and Child Health. She received an honorary doctorate from Leeds Metropolitan University in 1994 and was made an honorary trustee of the National Society for the Prevention of Cruelty to Children in 2003.

== Later life ==
Wynne was diagnosed with Parkinson's disease in 1990. She retired from clinical practice in 1999. She continued to teach until 2003, when she underwent heart surgery to repair medication-induced damage to her heart valves. She died on 18 June 2009 from multi-system failure.
