= Hugo Mascie-Taylor =

Medical doctor and administrator

Professor Bryan Hugo Mascie-Taylor known as Hugo, FRCP (born 21 August 1947), is a British medical doctor and administrator.

== Life ==
Scion of a Cheshire gentry family seated at Lymm, he is the elder son of Henry Mascie-Taylor (1917–1971) and Eira née Wilding, and a great-great-grandson of the Revd Domville Mascie-Taylor (1783–1845).

Educated at Sir Thomas Rich's School, Gloucester, Mascie-Taylor then went up to read medicine at the University of Leeds (MBChB) before pursuing further studies at University of California, San Francisco and Durham University (MBA).

A consultant physician at St James's University Hospital (1986–91) and Seacroft Hospital (1991–94), Mascie-Taylor then served as Executive Medical Director of Leeds Teaching Hospitals NHS Trust (1998–2009), including periods acting as Chief Executive and Medical Director at the NHS Confederation until 2013.

One of two special administrators appointed to manage Mid Staffordshire NHS Foundation Trust in April 2013, in May 2014 Mascie-Taylor was appointed Medical Director and Executive Director of Patient and Clinical Engagement, for Monitor (NHS). On a salary of between £195,000 and £199,999 from Monitor, he was in 2015 the 328th highest-paid British public sector workers.

Also a board member of Health Education England and the UK Revalidation Programme of the General Medical Council Mascie-Taylor formerly served on the policy board of NHS Employers.

Elected a Visiting Fellow of York University (1996–2003), in 2004 Mascie-Taylor was appointed a Visiting Professor in the School of Medicine at the University of Leeds, since when he also chairs OPT IN, a charity helping British healthcare professionals deliver training to partner hospitals in low income countries.

== See also ==
- Lymm Hall
