= Special administrator =

A Special administrator is a court-appointed person who administrates a court-defined part of an estate during probate. A special administrator with expertise in automobiles, for example, would administrate the probate of the deceased's car collection. A special administrator can also oversee an entire estate, albeit for a limited time (in case of emergency). In this case, the special administrator's job is to maintain the estate, not take control of the probate.
