= Chapel Allerton Hospital =

NHS hospital in Yorkshire, England

- Leeds Teaching Hospitals NHS Trust
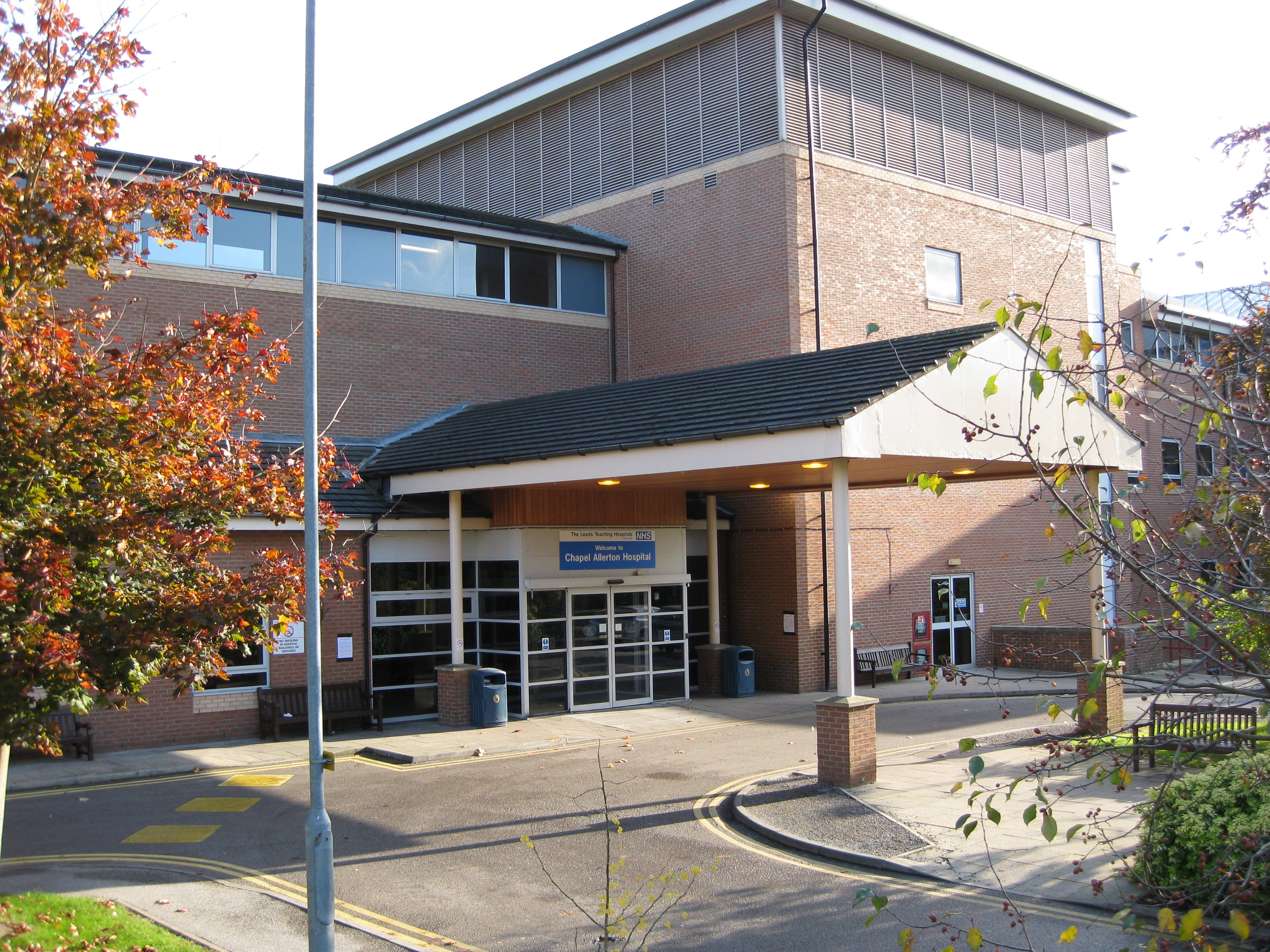
- Main Entrance

Geography
- Location: Chapeltown Road, Leeds, England
- Coordinates: 53°49′21″N 1°31′47″W

Organisation
- Care system: NHS
- Type: General

Services
- Emergency department: No
- Beds: 132

History
- Opened: 1927

Links
- Website: http://www.leedsth.nhs.uk/patients-and-visitors/our-hospitals/chapel-allerton-hospital/
- Lists: Hospitals in England

Chapel Allerton Hospital is located in the area of Chapel Allerton, Leeds, West Yorkshire, England and is operated by the Leeds Teaching Hospitals NHS Trust. The main entrance is on Chapeltown Road, with vehicle exits onto Harehills Lane and Newton Road.

== History ==
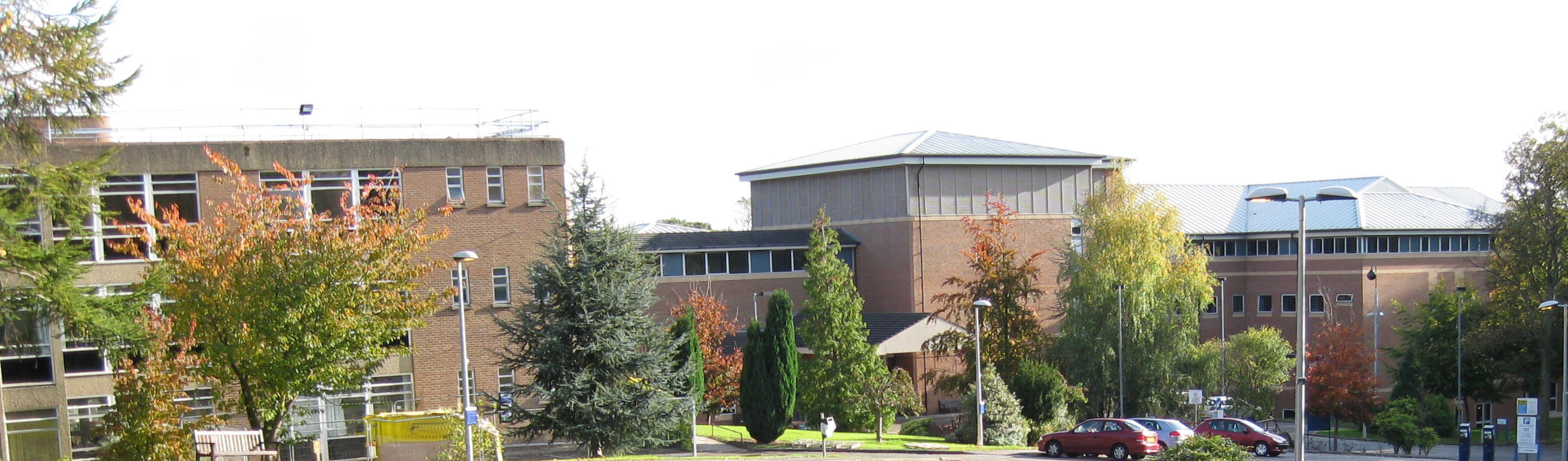
View from the direction of Chapeltown Road

The hospital was founded in 1927, to care for injured soldiers from the First World War under the then Ministry of Pensions, replacing a military hospital at Beckett Park. It was opened on 16 May 1927 by Princess Mary. She had been welcomed by the Leeds Lord Mayor Hugh Lupton, whose niece, Anne Lupton, had been appointed a MBE in 1920 for her work on the Leeds War Pensions Committee, advising injured soldiers. The hospital was built in the grounds of Gledhow Grove mansion, and the mansion itself was also used. Gledhow Grove had been the home of both Albert Kitson, Lord Airedale and his first cousin - Frederick James Kitson, Leeds Lord Mayor in 1908 and 1910. Lord and Lady Airedale had owned the nearby Gledhow Hall Estate.

In 1953 the hospital was transferred to the Ministry of Health and developed as a general hospital. In 1975 the Newton Green Wing was opened in purpose-built buildings on the opposite, south, side of Harehills Lane. It was named after the Newton Green Hall estate, acquired in 1936, upon which the new hospital buildings were built. New accommodation for the whole hospital was added on this site 1992-1994, and opened by the Duchess of Kent. The old hospital buildings were demolished, the Grade II listed mansion has been left derelict with new housing built in the grounds.

== Chapel ==
The chapel is located on the third floor of the north wing.

== Broadcasting ==
The hospital operates a 24/7 radio station, Radio Allerton, which has broadcast to both staff and patients since 1978.

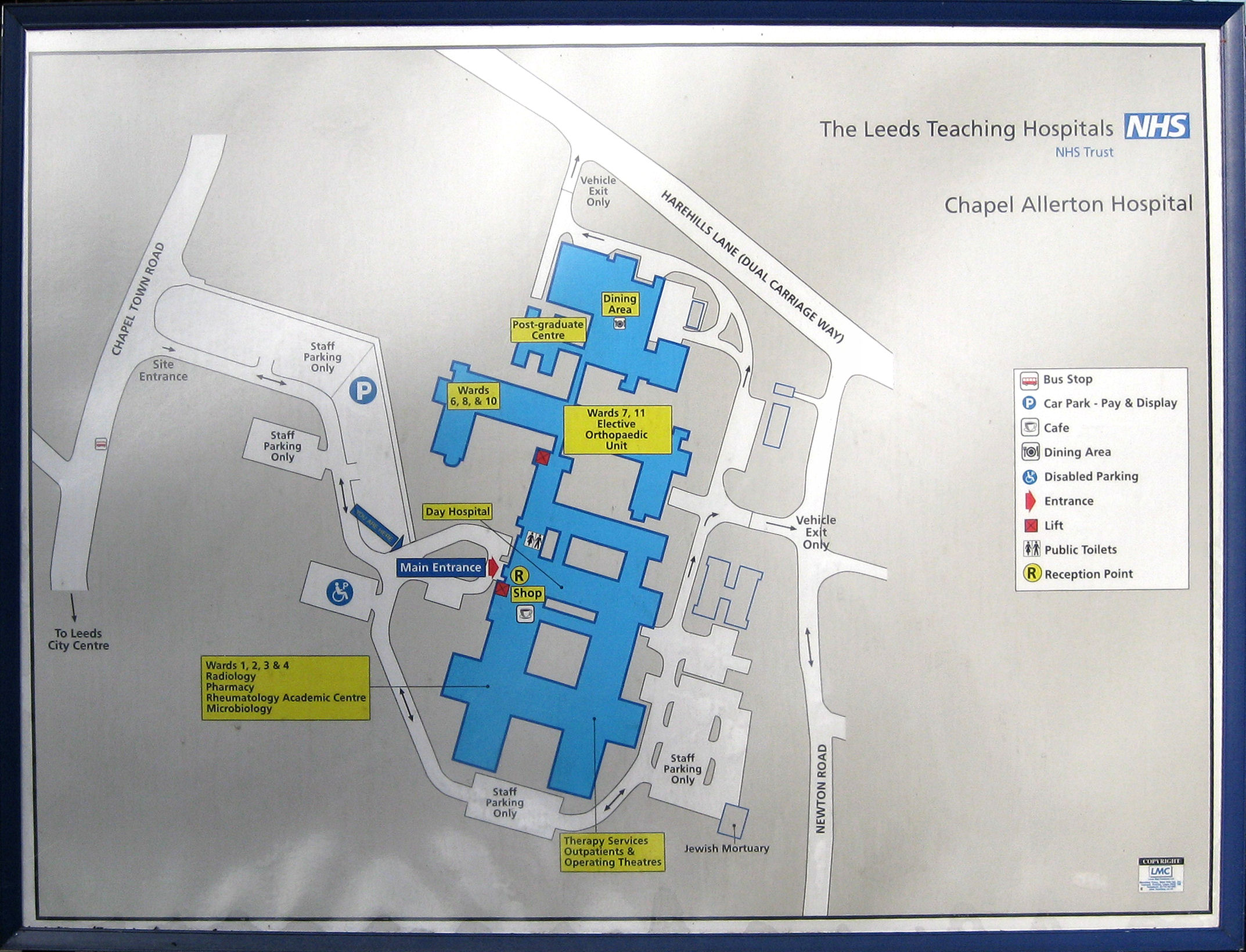
Map Sign for Chapel Allerton Hospital

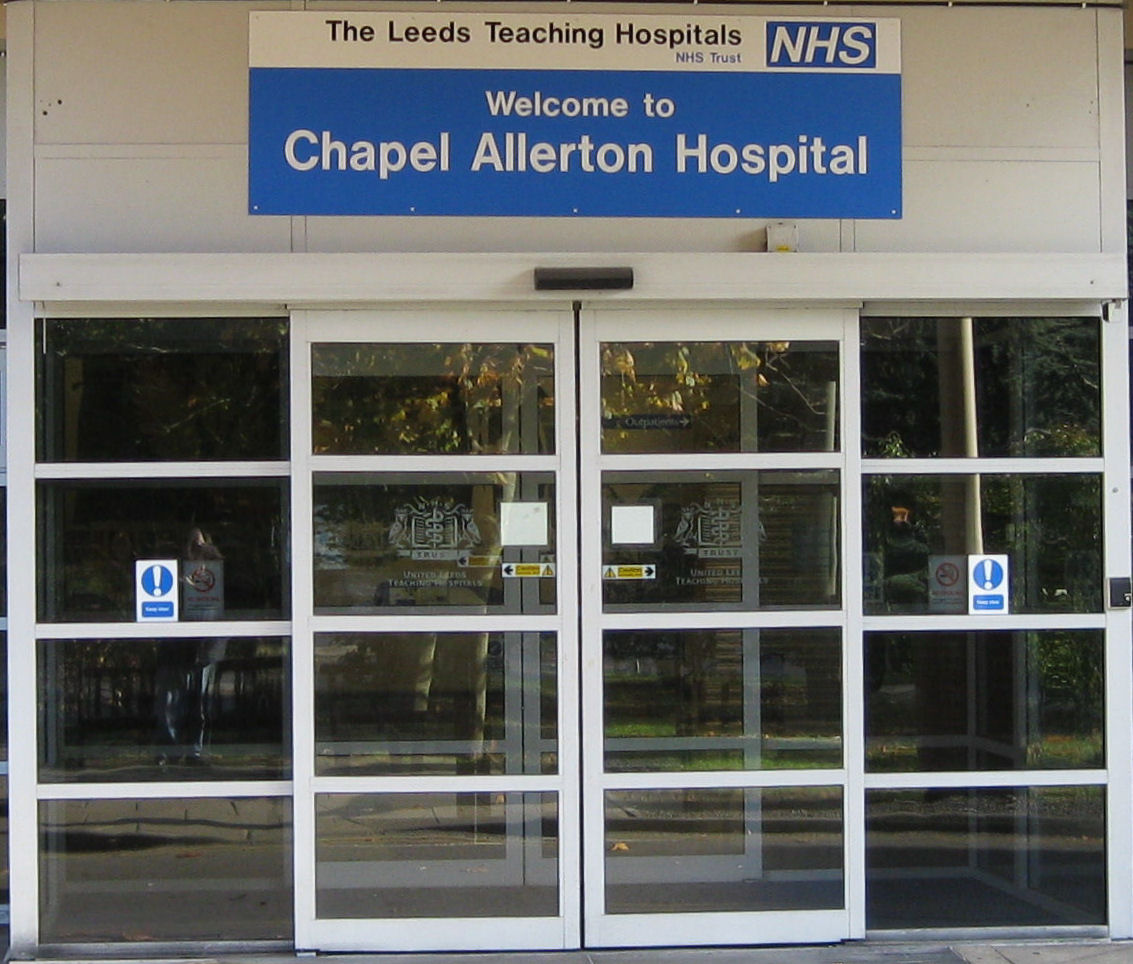
Entrance

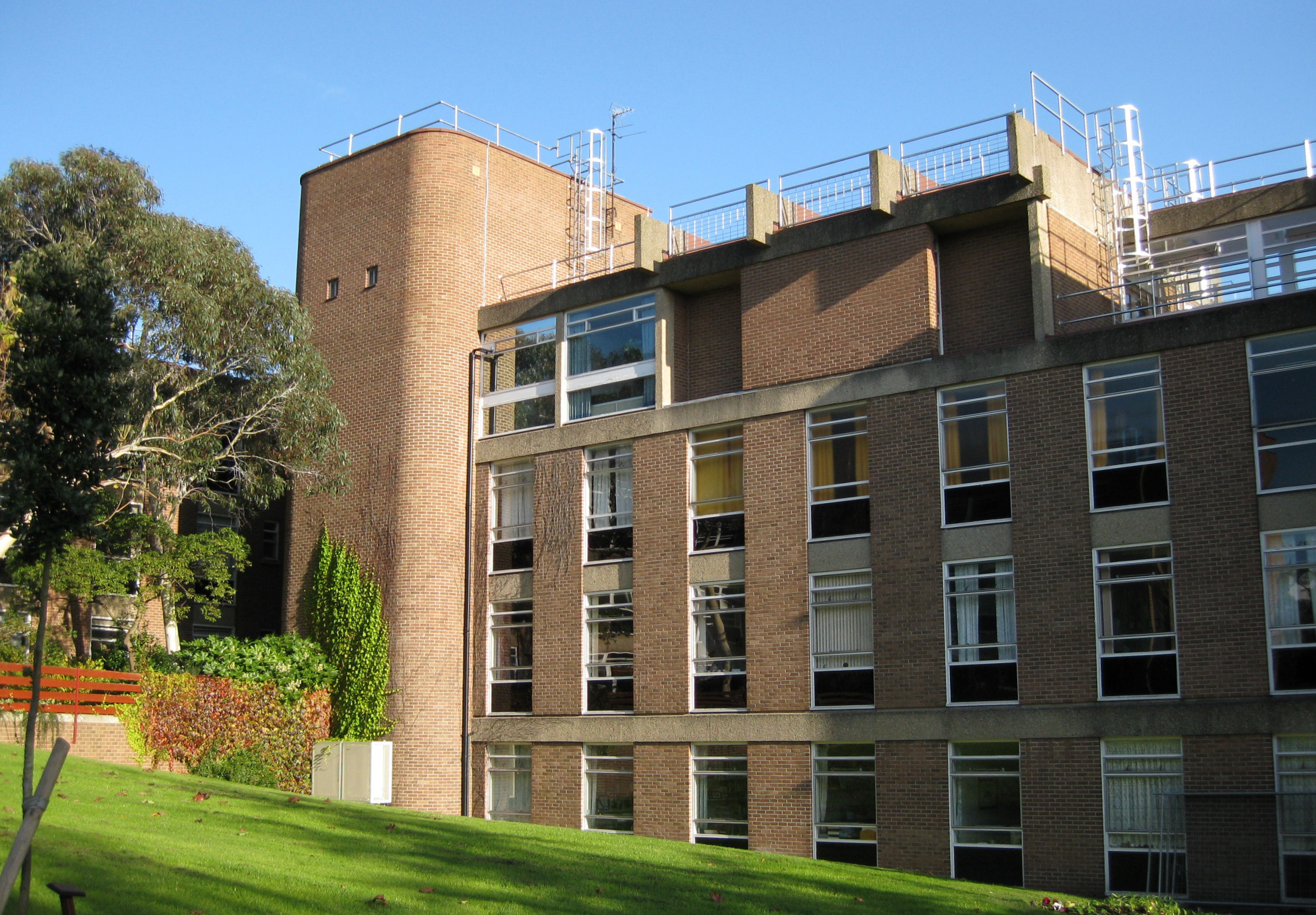
Wards

== See also ==
- List of hospitals in England
