= Leeds Teaching Hospitals NHS Trust =

NHS hospital trust

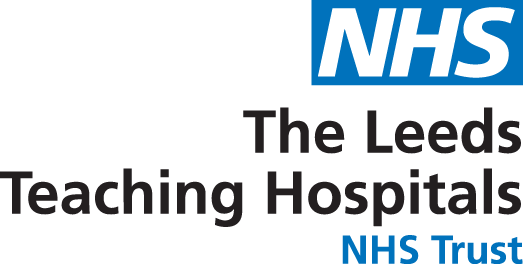
- Type: NHS hospital trust
- Established: April 1998
- Headquarters: Leeds, West Yorkshire, England
- Region served: Leeds
- Hospitals: Leeds General Infirmary; St James's University Hospital; Chapel Allerton Hospital; Leeds Dental Institute; Seacroft Hospital; Wharfedale Hospital
- Chair: Antony Kildare
- Chief executive: Brendan Brown
- Staff: 18,000
- Website: www.leedsth.nhs.uk

Leeds Teaching Hospitals NHS Trust is an NHS hospital trust in Leeds, West Yorkshire, England.

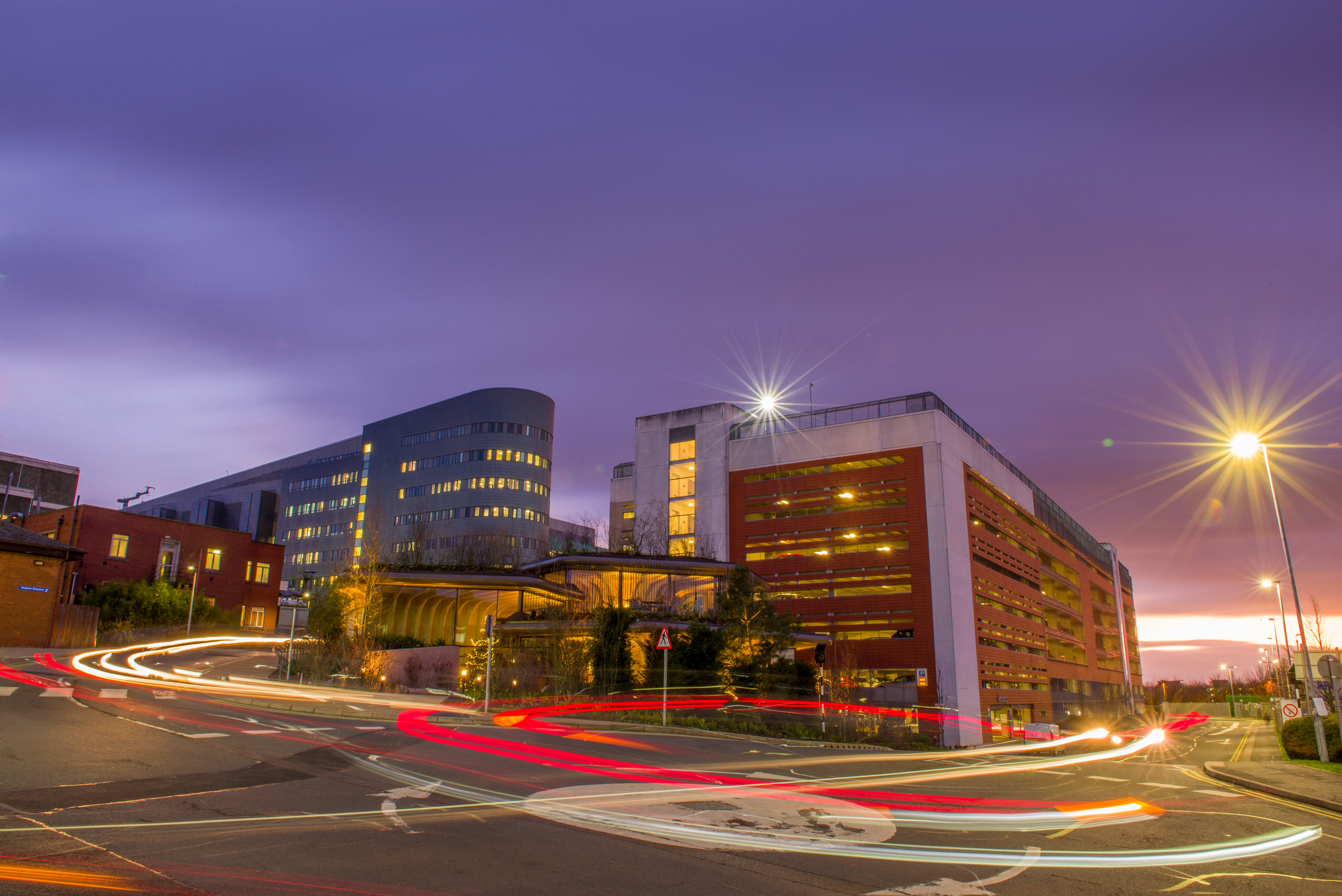
View of St James's Hospital at night

The Trust was formed in April 1998 after the merger of two previous smaller NHS trusts to form one citywide organisation. The former trusts were United Leeds Teaching Hospitals NHS Trust (based at Leeds General Infirmary) and St James's & Seacroft University Hospitals NHS Trust (based at St James's University Hospital).

The Trust has an overall income of around £1.8 billion and provides local and specialist services for the immediate population of 770,000 and regional specialist care for up to 5.4 million people.

The Trust is rated as Good by the Care Quality Commission.

== Services ==
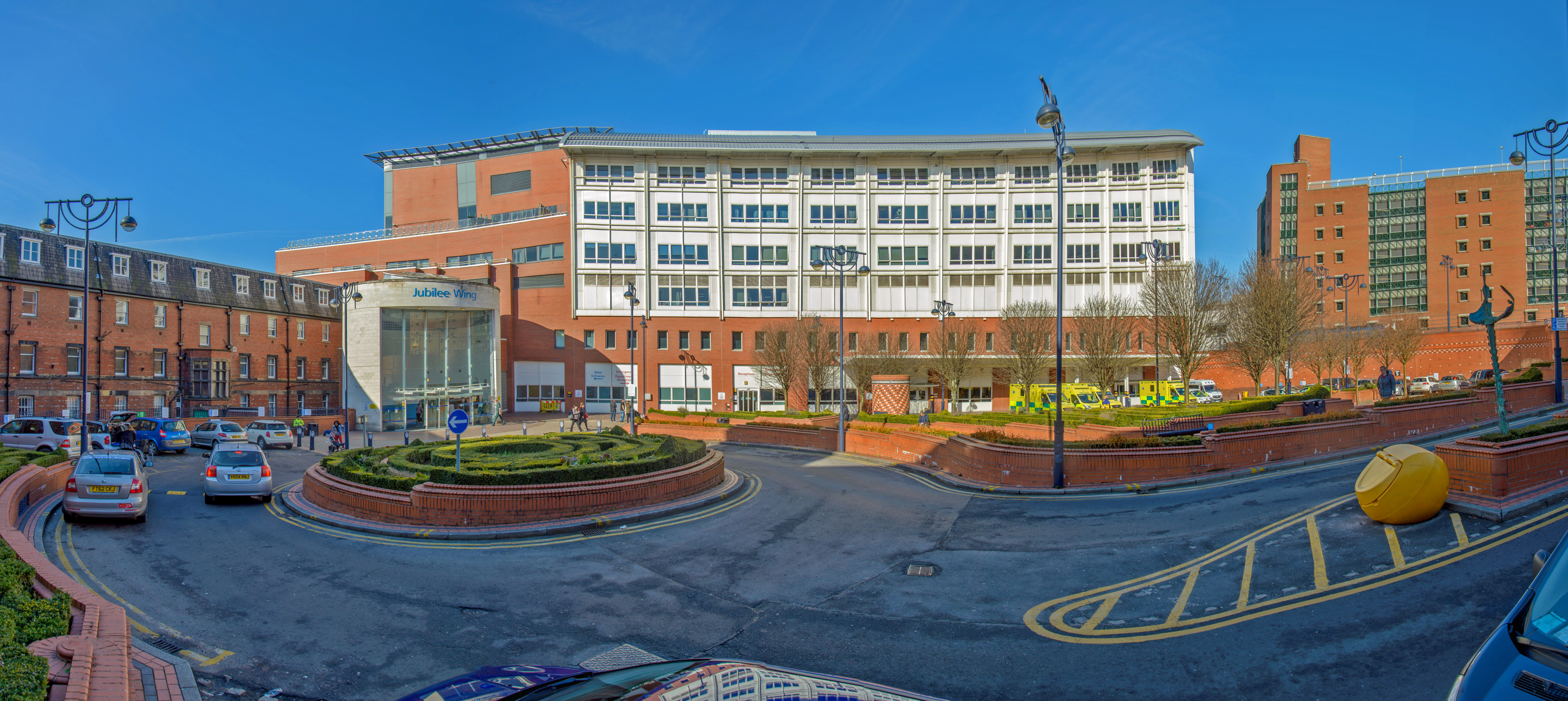
Jubilee wing, Leeds General Infirmary

It provides services for the population of Leeds and surrounding areas, and is a regional centre for a range of services including cancer, neurosurgery, heart surgery, liver and kidney transplantation. In 2009 it was the largest NHS trust in England, and now employs over 18,000 staff on seven main sites.

It runs seven hospitals:

- Chapel Allerton Hospital
- Leeds Dental Institute
- Leeds General Infirmary
- Leeds Children's Hospital
- St James's University Hospital (including Leeds Cancer Centre)
- Seacroft Hospital
- Wharfedale Hospital

As part of the national response to COVID-19, Leeds Teaching Hospitals also hosted the NHS Nightingale Hospital for Yorkshire and the Humber, located at the Harrogate Convention Centre.

Leeds Teaching Hospitals NHS Trust delivered the largest surplus in its 20-year history in 2018/19, of almost £53m, compared to the surplus of £19m in the previous year.

The Trust has had difficulty gaining Foundation Trust status because of failures to hit key financial and performance targets which caused the Chief Executive Maggie Boyle to resign in June 2013.

It is the biggest provider of specialised services in England, which generated an income of £415.3 million in 2014/5.

== Redevelopment ==
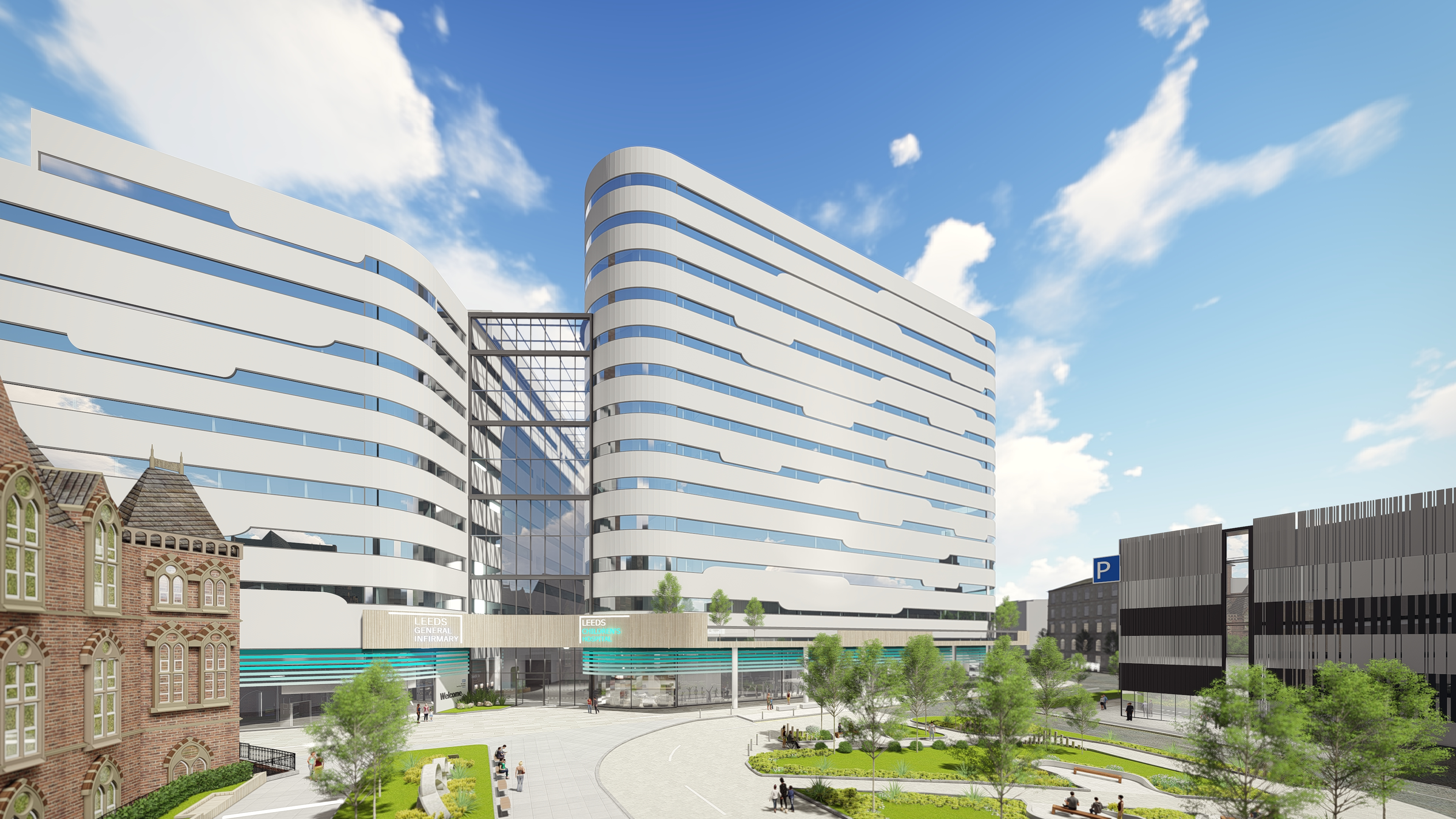
Redevelopment of LGI site

The Trust is planning significant development and investment across its hospital sites. This includes the building of two new hospitals on the Leeds General Infirmary site (a hospital for adults and one for children and young people) known as Hospitals of the Future and a new Pathology laboratory at St James's Hospital serving hospitals in Leeds, West Yorkshire and Harrogate.

The programme will also support the development of an "Innovation District" for Leeds, bringing together the Trust, the two Leeds Universities and Leeds City Council in sectors including precision medicine, digital health, data and new business.

The trust leased office space for 250 staff at 2 Park Lane in the city centre for seven years in 2020 in order to free up space for the development.

== Research ==
A dedicated Research and Innovation Centre opened at St James's Hospital in 2017 and a six-bed Children's Clinical Research Facility was opened at Leeds Children's Hospital by the Countess of Wessex in 2018.

Throughout 2019/2020, the Trust opened 231 new studies overall with the highest recruiting study being the Yorkshire Cancer Research funded Yorkshire Lung Screening Trial.

League table results released in July 2019 by the National Institute for Health and Care Research (NIHR), showed that Leeds Teaching Hospitals was the 4th highest ranked NHS Trust for health research recruitment, recruiting 20,983 people in 2018/19.

In 2020, a Clinical Research Facility (CRF) opened in the Bexley Wing at St James's Hospital. It provides dedicated space and facilities for the care of patients participating in clinical trials and was funded by the Trust with support from the University of Leeds, and additional funding provided by hospital charity Leeds Cares for specialist equipment.

The Trust's research teams recruited the first patient globally and the first patient in the UK to two COVID-19 research trials of potential new therapies for the virus. The research teams also developed a way to turn a sleep apnoea machine into a ventilator to treat people with COVID-19. The modification on a device known as a Nippy3 was a collaboration between clinical staff, engineers and physicists at Leeds Teaching Hospitals and academics and technologists at the University of Leeds.

The Leeds Cancer Research Centre is a partnership between the University of Leeds and Leeds Teaching Hospitals NHS Trust and launched in July 2020. It brings together scientists and clinicians across discipline boundaries to deliver cancer research that ultimately improves patient outcomes. The Trust is also one of seven Centres of Excellence in a UK-wide network, RadNet, involved in radiotherapy research.

Leeds Teaching Hospitals is part of the Northern Pathology Imaging Co-operative (NPIC) which embraces a network of nine NHS hospitals, seven universities and ten medical technology companies. NPIC aims to deploy digital pathology across hospitals in the North of England and will develop artificial intelligence tools to help diagnose cancer and other disease.

== Performance ==
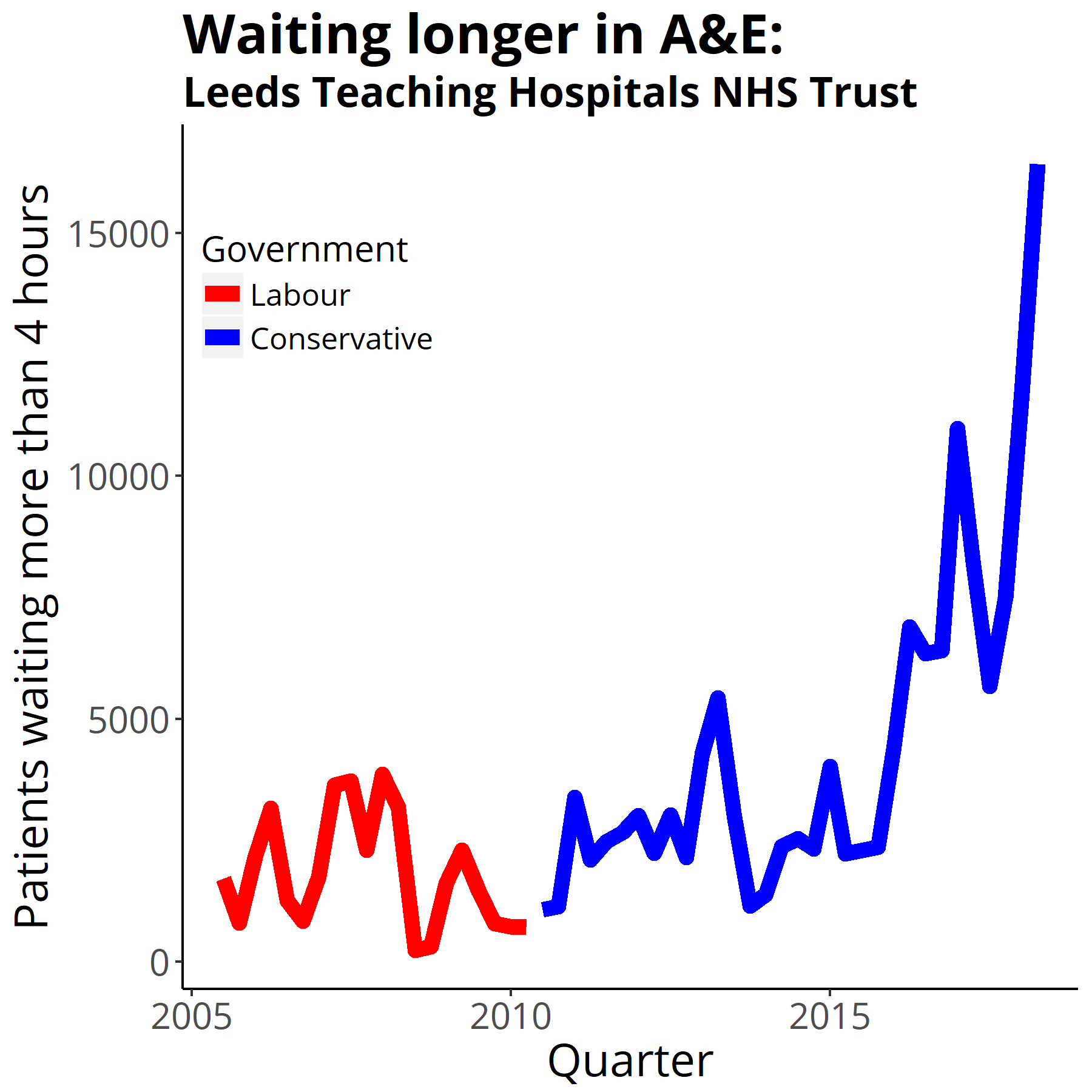
Four-hour target in the emergency department quarterly figures from NHS England Data from https://www.england.nhs.uk/statistics/statistical-work-areas/ae-waiting-times-and-activity/

In October 2013 as a result of the Keogh Review the Trust was put into the highest risk category by the Care Quality Commission.

In 2016, the Leeds Teaching Hospitals NHS Trust was inspected and rated Good by the CQC.

The Trust was highlighted by NHS England as having 3 of the 148 reported never events in the period from April to September 2013.

The trust was one of five to benefit from a five-year, £12.5m programme announced by Jeremy Hunt in July 2015 to bring in Virginia Mason Medical Center to assist English hospitals using their clinical engagement and culture tools including the Patient Safety Alert System and electronic dashboard.

In 2016, the Department of Health awarded funds to six healthcare trusts in England – the Scan4Safety demonstrator sites – to investigate how consistent use of point of care scanning might improve efficiency and safety within the NHS. Leeds Teaching Hospitals was one of the original demonstrator sites and has achieved savings of £84,411.07 per year on product recalls, with recall times falling from 8.33 days to less than 35 minutes.

In April 2016 it was reported that the trust had been forced to cancel liver transplant operations because of a shortage of critical care nurses.

The trust renegotiated the private finance initiative for the Bexley Wing at St James's Hospital in May 2017 and expects to save £52 million over the life of the contract.

== See also ==
- List of NHS trusts
