= Yorkshire Cancer Research =

British charitable organisation

- Founded: 1925
- Type: Charitable organisation
- Registration no.: England and Wales: 516898
- Purpose: Cancer research
- Location: Yorkshire Cancer Research Centre, Hornbeam Square W, Harrogate HG2 8PA
- Region served: United Kingdom
- Key people: Dr Kathryn Scott (Chief Executive)
- Revenue: £5.1 million (2014)
- Website: yorkshirecancerresearch.org.uk

Yorkshire Cancer Research is an English registered charity.

Founded in 1925, Yorkshire Cancer Research has supported projects across the county of Yorkshire for 100 years, mainly in the county's regional universities and teaching hospitals, including Bradford University, Hull University, Leeds University, Sheffield University and University of York and their associated teaching hospitals.

Yorkshire Cancer Research is a member of the Association of Medical Research Charities (AMRC).

== See also ==
- Cancer in the United Kingdom
