= Leeds General Infirmary =

Hospital in West Yorkshire, England

Coordinates: 53.80208°N 1.55083°W

- Leeds Teaching Hospitals NHS Trust
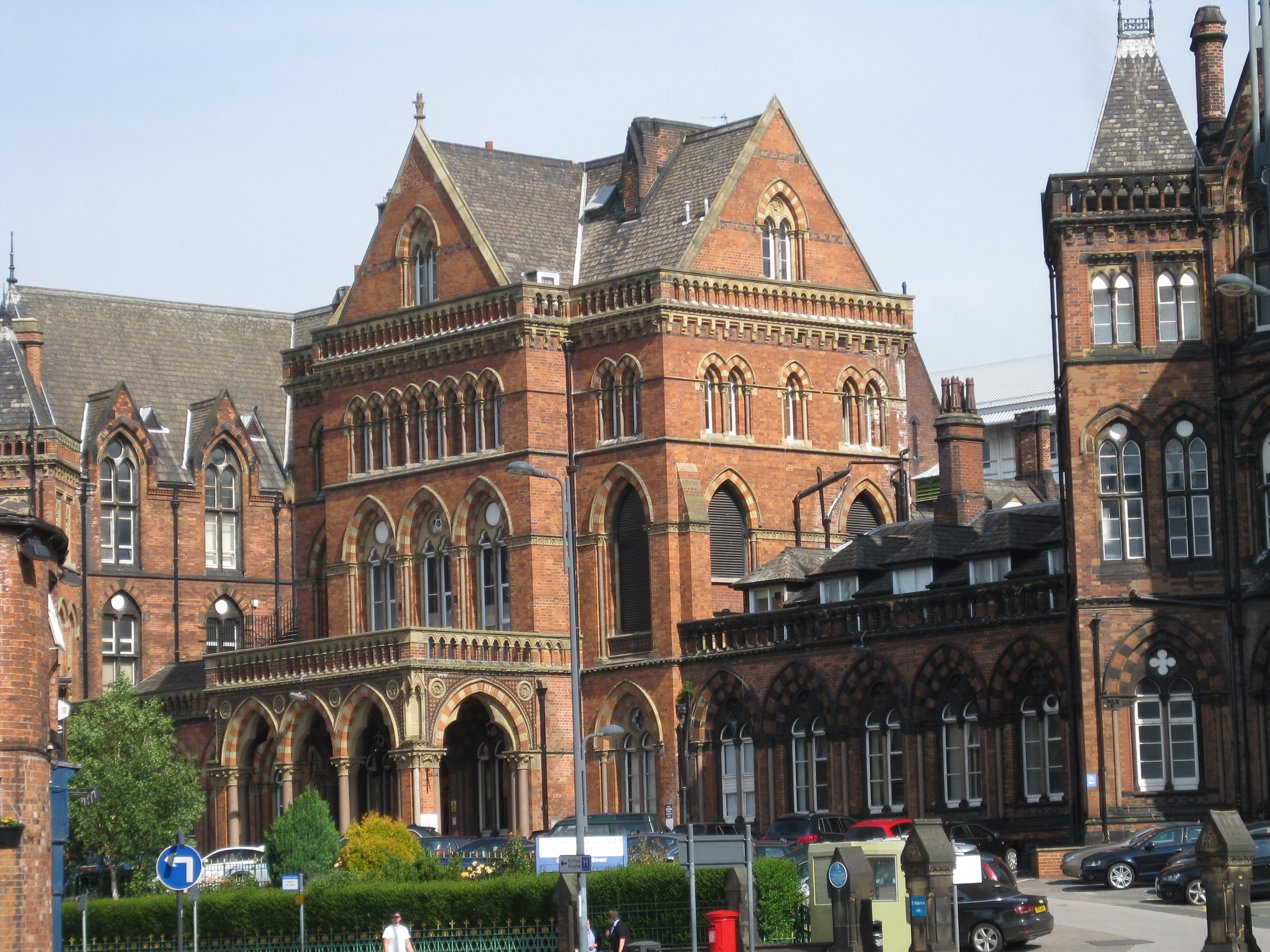
- Old George Street Entrance

- Shown in West Yorkshire

Geography
- Location: Leeds, West Yorkshire, England

Organisation
- Care system: NHS
- Type: Teaching
- Affiliated university: Leeds School of Medicine

Services
- Emergency department: Major Trauma Centre – (Adult and Children)
- Beds: 1103

History
- Founded: 1771 (current site opened 1869)

Links
- Website: http://www.leedsth.nhs.uk/patients-visitors/our-hospitals/leeds-general-infirmary/
- Lists: Hospitals in England

Leeds General Infirmary (LGI) is a large teaching hospital based in the centre of Leeds, West Yorkshire, England, and is part of the Leeds Teaching Hospitals NHS Trust. Its previous name The General Infirmary at Leeds is still sometimes used.

The LGI is a specialist centre for a number of services, including the regional Major Trauma Centre and hand transplants. It also provides many general acute services like A&E, intensive care and high dependency units, maternity and state-of-the-art operating theatres. A helipad on the roof of the Jubilee Wing gives direct access to the hospital for the Yorkshire Air Ambulance.

Two new hospitals are planned on the site. One will be a maternity unit with capacity to deliver up to 10,500 babies a year. Completion is planned between 2026-2028. It will remove the need to transfer expectant mothers between St James’s Hospital and Leeds General Infirmary.

== History ==
The first hospital known as Leeds Infirmary was opened in 1771 on what is now the site of the former Yorkshire Bank in Infirmary Street off City Square, Leeds. Notably, the founding five physicians at the infirmary were all graduates of the University of Edinburgh Medical School. Construction of the current hospital on its new site in Great George Street started in 1863 to the designs of Sir George Gilbert Scott and built by the Bradford firm, J and W Beanland.

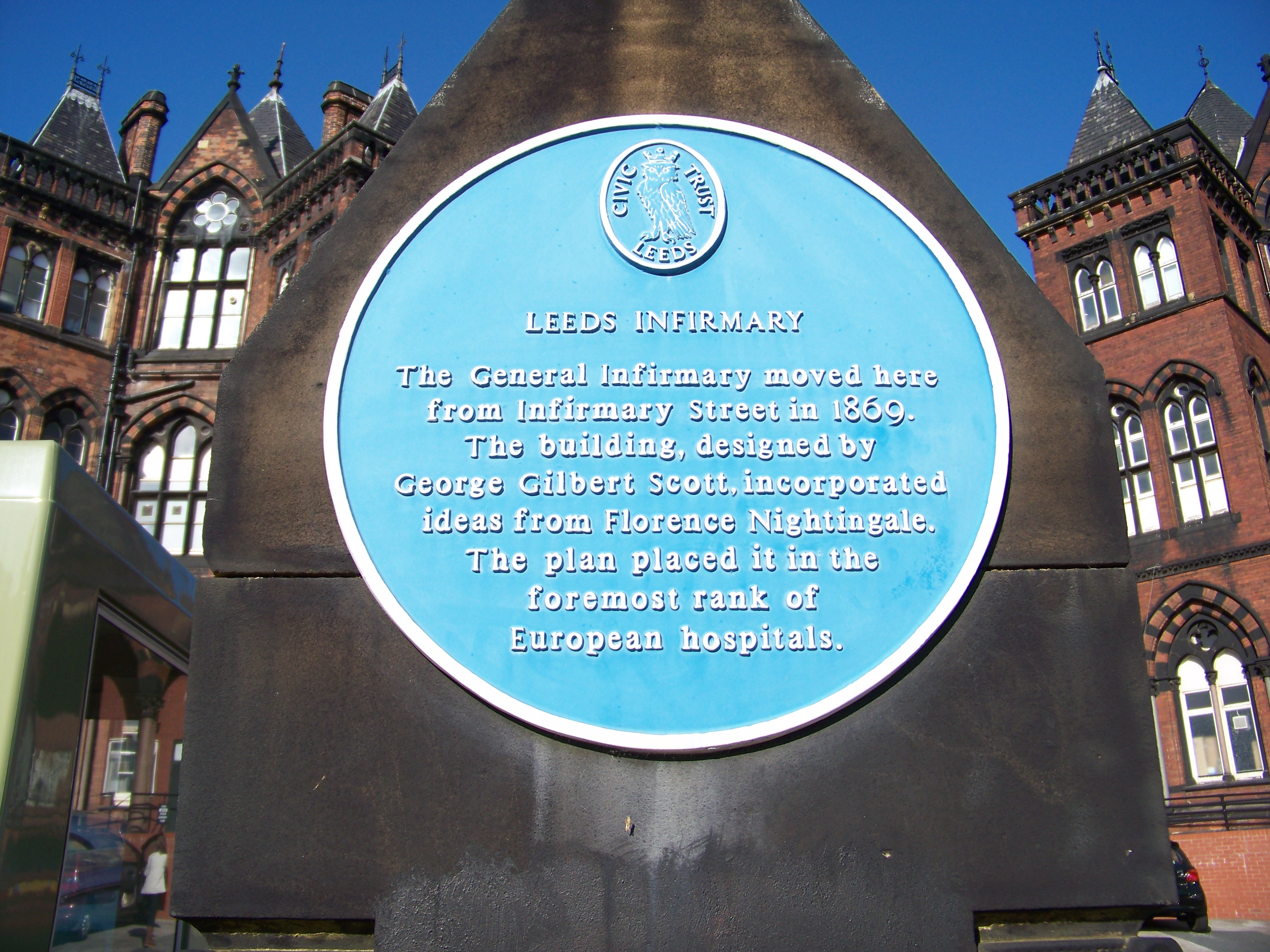
Blue plaque on the gatepost

Before drawing up the plans Gilbert Scott and the Infirmary's Chief Physician, Dr Charles Chadwick, visited many of the great contemporary hospitals of Europe. They were particularly impressed by hospitals based on the pavilion plan recommended by Miss Florence Nightingale, and adopted this for the new Infirmary. It featured the latest innovations, with plentiful baths and lavatories throughout, and a system of hydraulic hoists to reduce the labours of attendants and nurses. However, the very high ceilings recommended by Nightingale meant that it could not be adequately heated, and doors to bathrooms were too narrow to admit a wheelchair.

Though completed in 1868, it had no patients for the first year. Instead it actually housed a temporary loan exhibition (‘National Exhibition of Works of Art’), held to recover some of the £100,000 construction costs. Unfortunately, after half a million visitors, the profit came to only £5. It was officially opened on 19 May 1869 by Prince Albert, the Prince of Wales (later King Edward VII).

The building was extended to designs by George Corson between 1891 and 1892. The Brotherton Wing, which now faces Millennium Square opened in 1940, the Martin and Wellcome Wings opened in the 1960s, the Worsley Building, which accommodates the Leeds Dental Institute and the Leeds School of Medicine, opened in 1979. The Clarendon Wing opened in 1984, replacing the former Leeds Women's and Children's Hospital, and now houses the Leeds Children's Hospital. The Jubilee Wing, named in celebration of the 50th anniversary of the National Health Service, which provides new Emergency Department services as well as housing regional cardiothoracic and neurosurgery facilities, opened in 1998. It is the main entrance and provides internal links to all other sections.

== Buildings ==
=== Victorian buildings ===
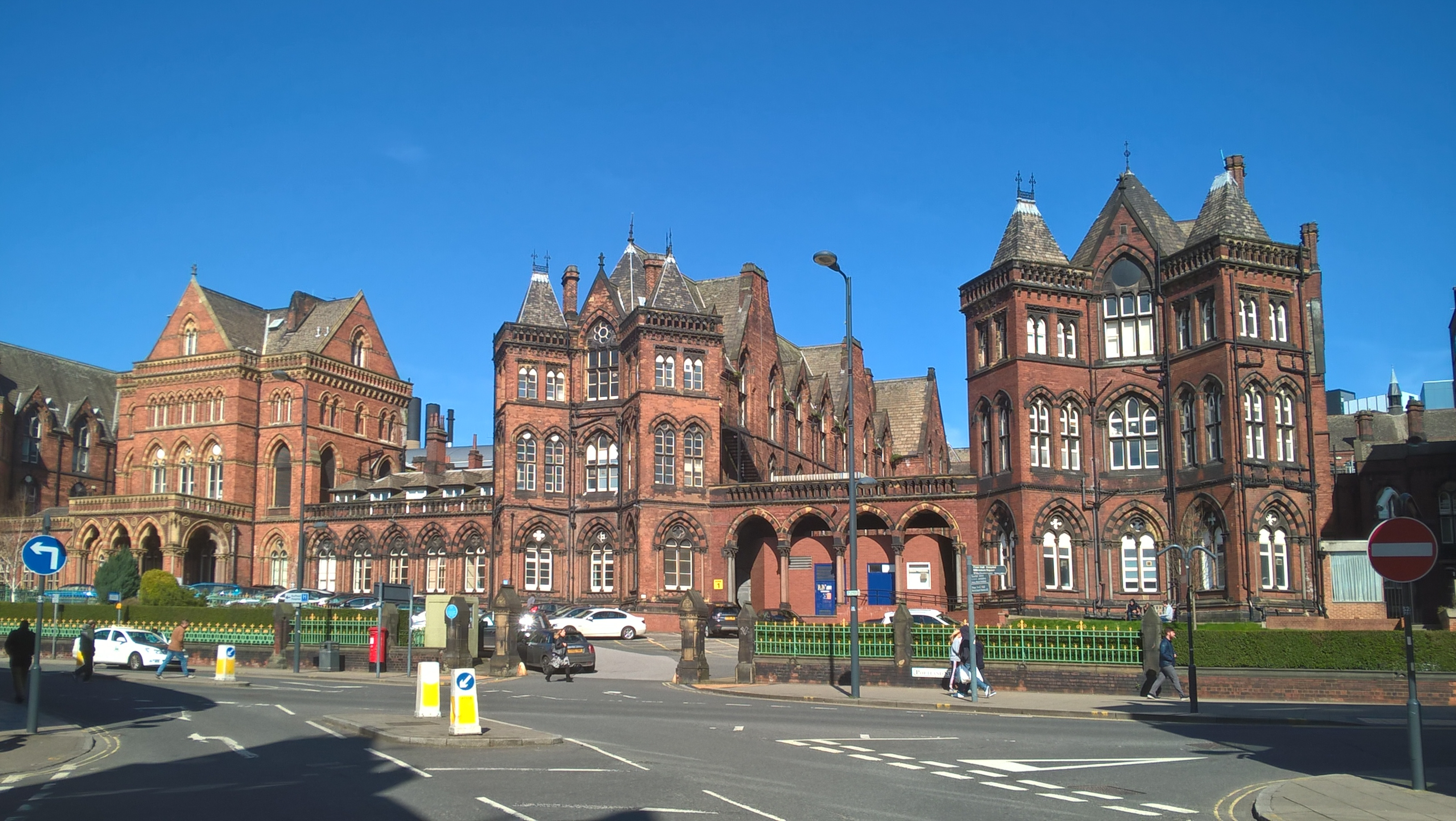
Great George Street frontage. Porch (left), East Wing (centre) and 1892 East extension (right)

Though the main entrance was on Thoresby Place, the south frontage on Great George Street provided the main decorative display, with plainer more functional facades elsewhere. Gilbert Scott's Gothic Revival frontage is in red brick with stone dressings, red granite pillars, slate roof with pinnacles and Venetian Gothic windows.

The original plan largely follows the layout of Lariboisière Hospital (1853) in France: a 'pavilion' arrangement providing cross lighting and ventilation for the wards and a Winter garden in a central glazed courtyard. The garden remains, but the glazing was removed in 1911.

There are three wings North and South of this courtyard, the central South one being the George Street entrance, which has a porch in Porte-cochère style. Inside it has a reception hall with a baronial fireplace leading to a glazed roof corridor with columns featuring carvings of medicinal plants by William Brindley and a mosaic floor. This leads to a staircase with decorative ironwork leading up to a landing with stained-glass windows. (As the site is on a slope, this is the level of the Thoresby Place entrance which is the primary floor for patients. The lower Great George Street level was used for administration and storerooms, the upper two floors for wards.) This opens onto a corridor going around the garden. In the corridor is a Potts clock and just along the corridor is a chapel dedicated to Saint Luke which opened in 1869.

The three wings on the south are joined by single storey closed colonnades to make the South facade. A further, but open colonnade East and another wing is a faithful copy of the original style by George Corson.

==== Interior of old building ====
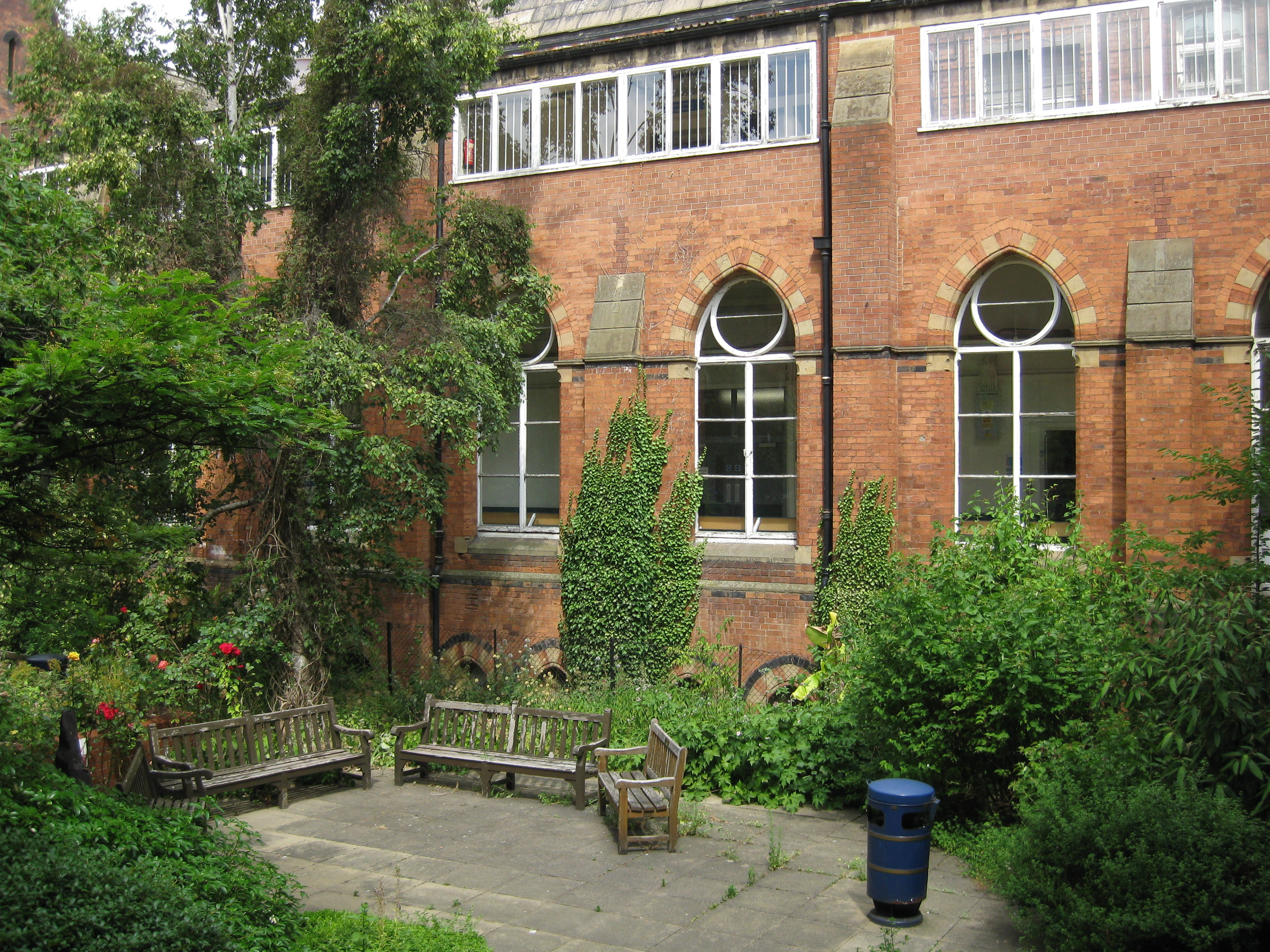
Central courtyard garden

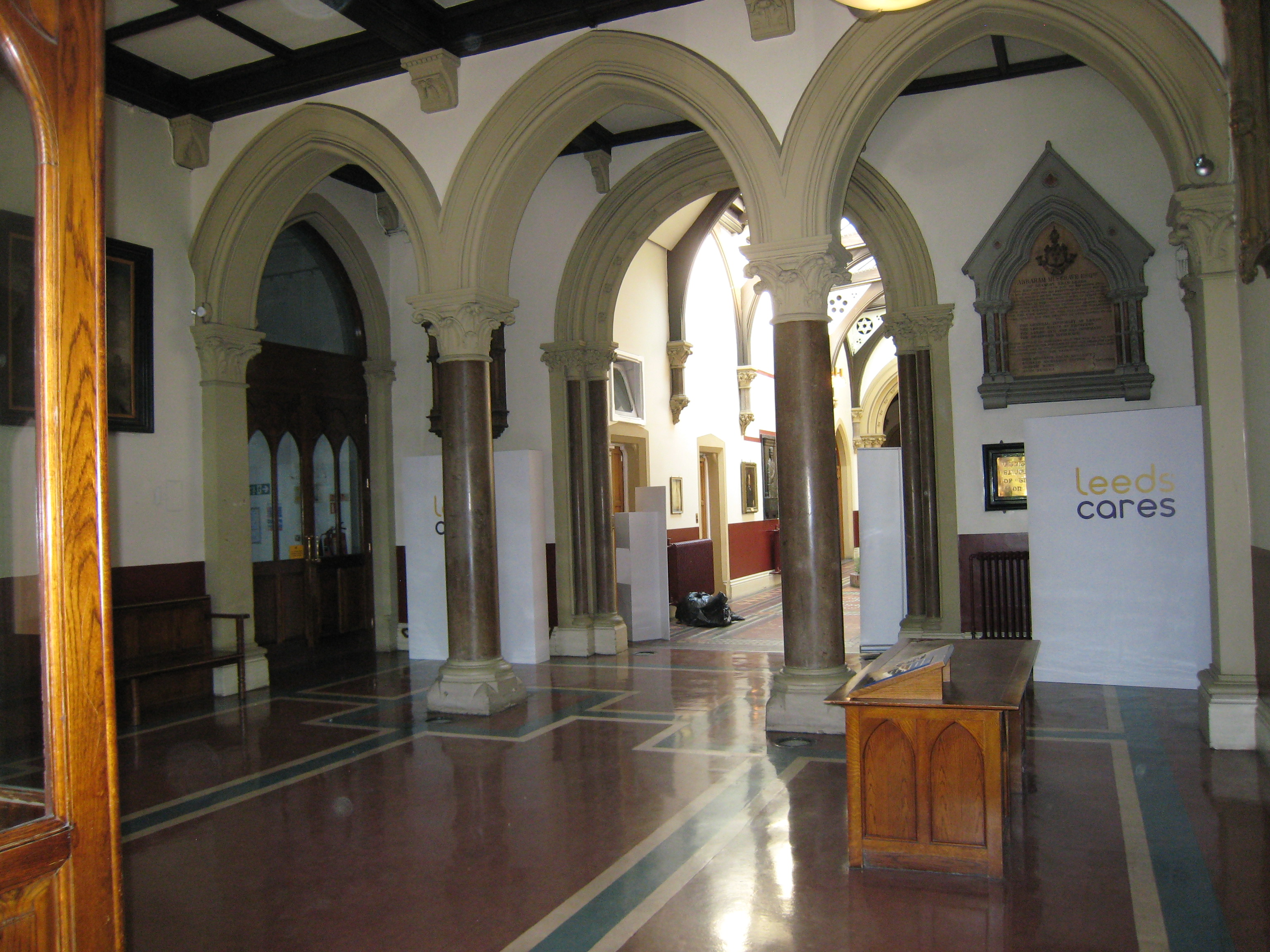
Great George Street entrance hall

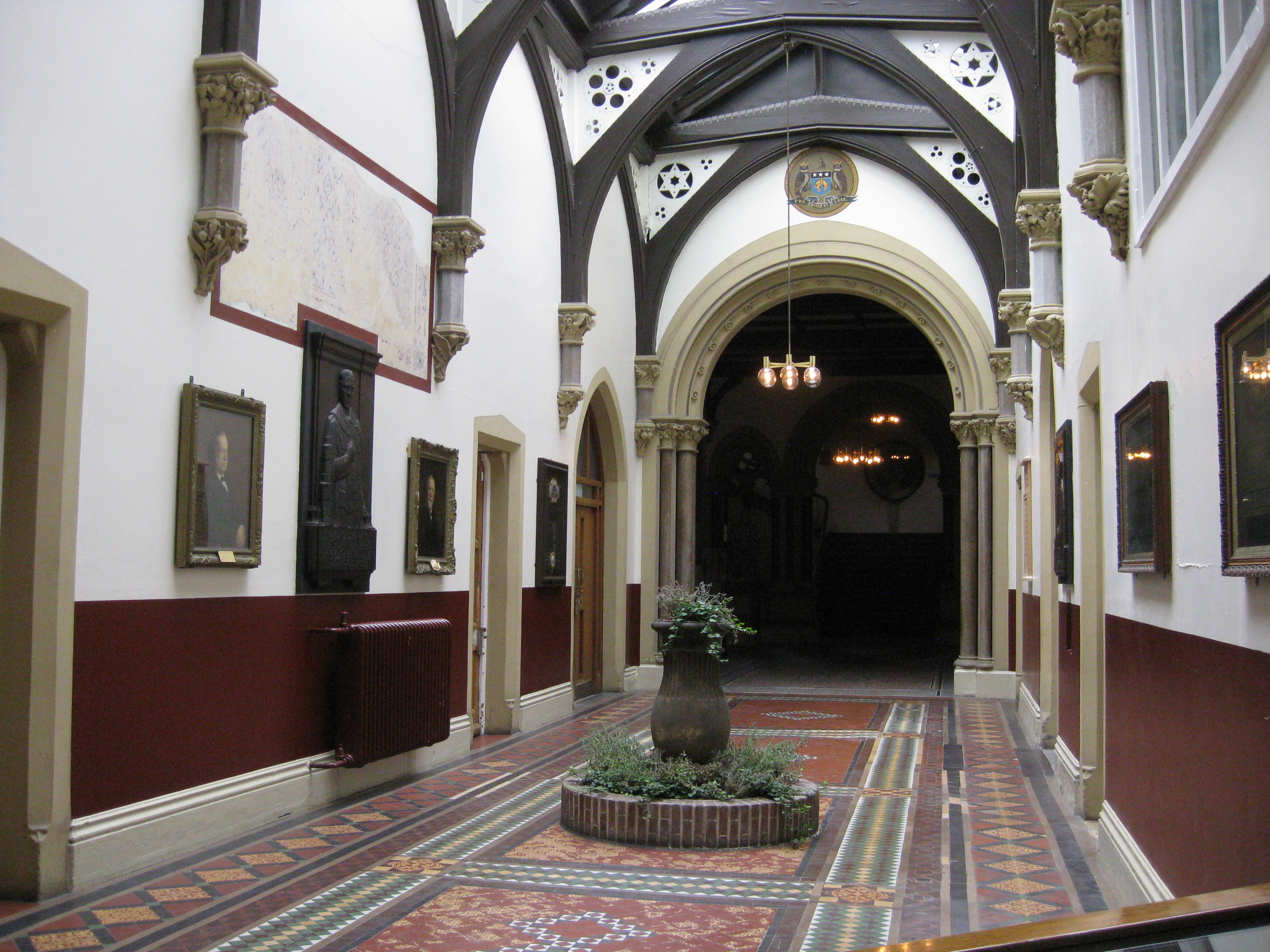
Corridor from the entrance hall

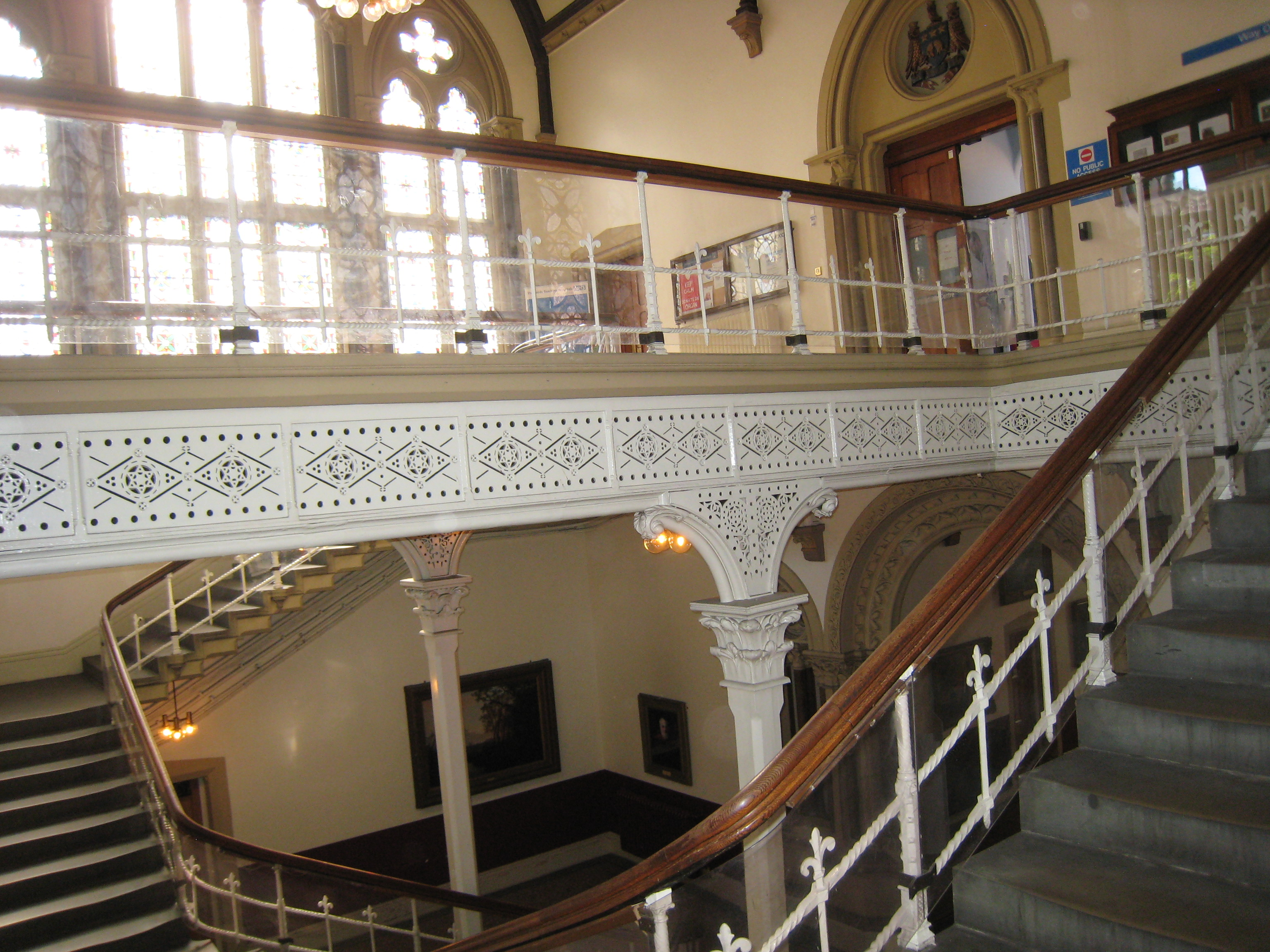
Staircase up to the main level of the hospital

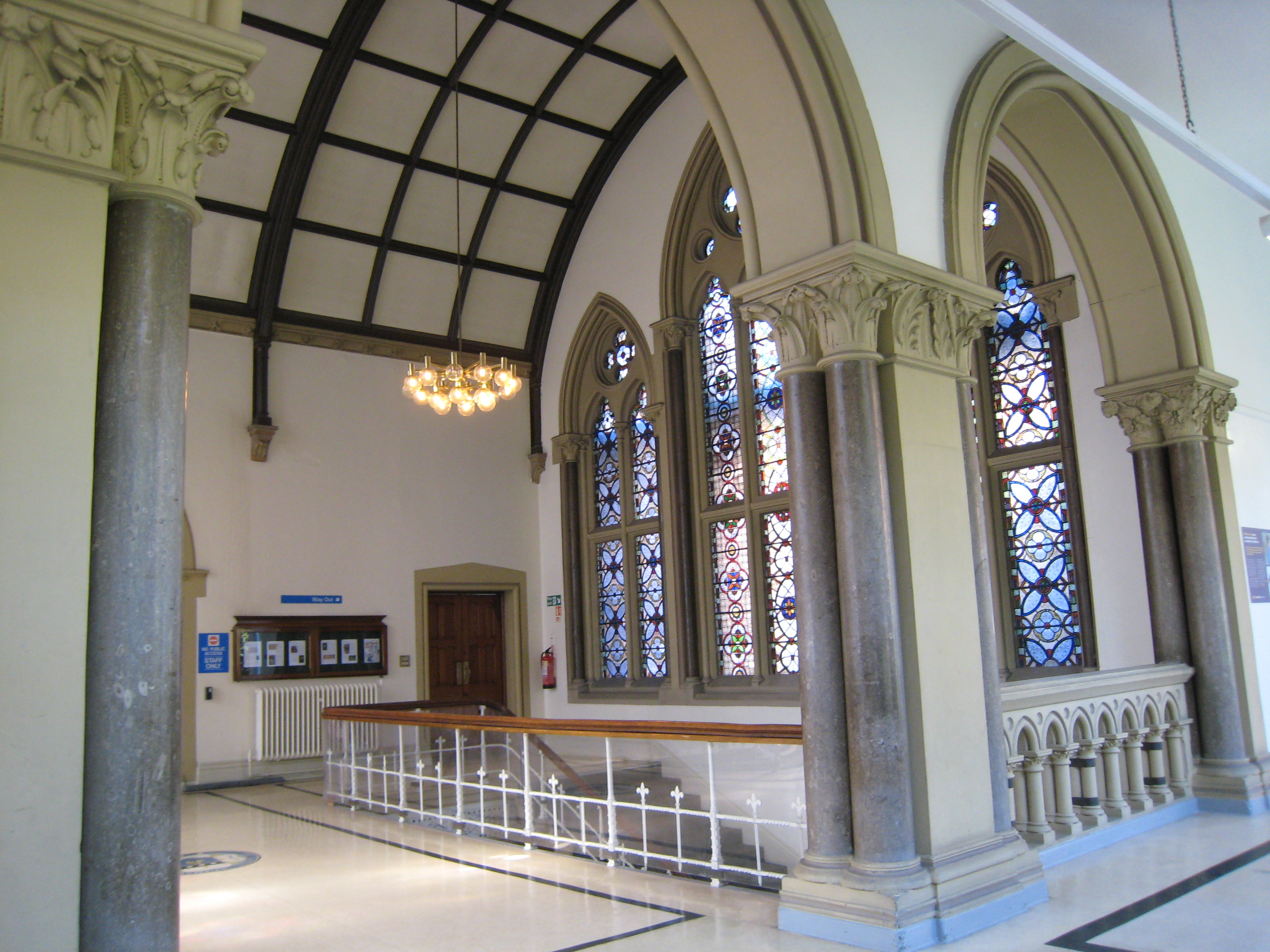
Landing at the top of the staircase

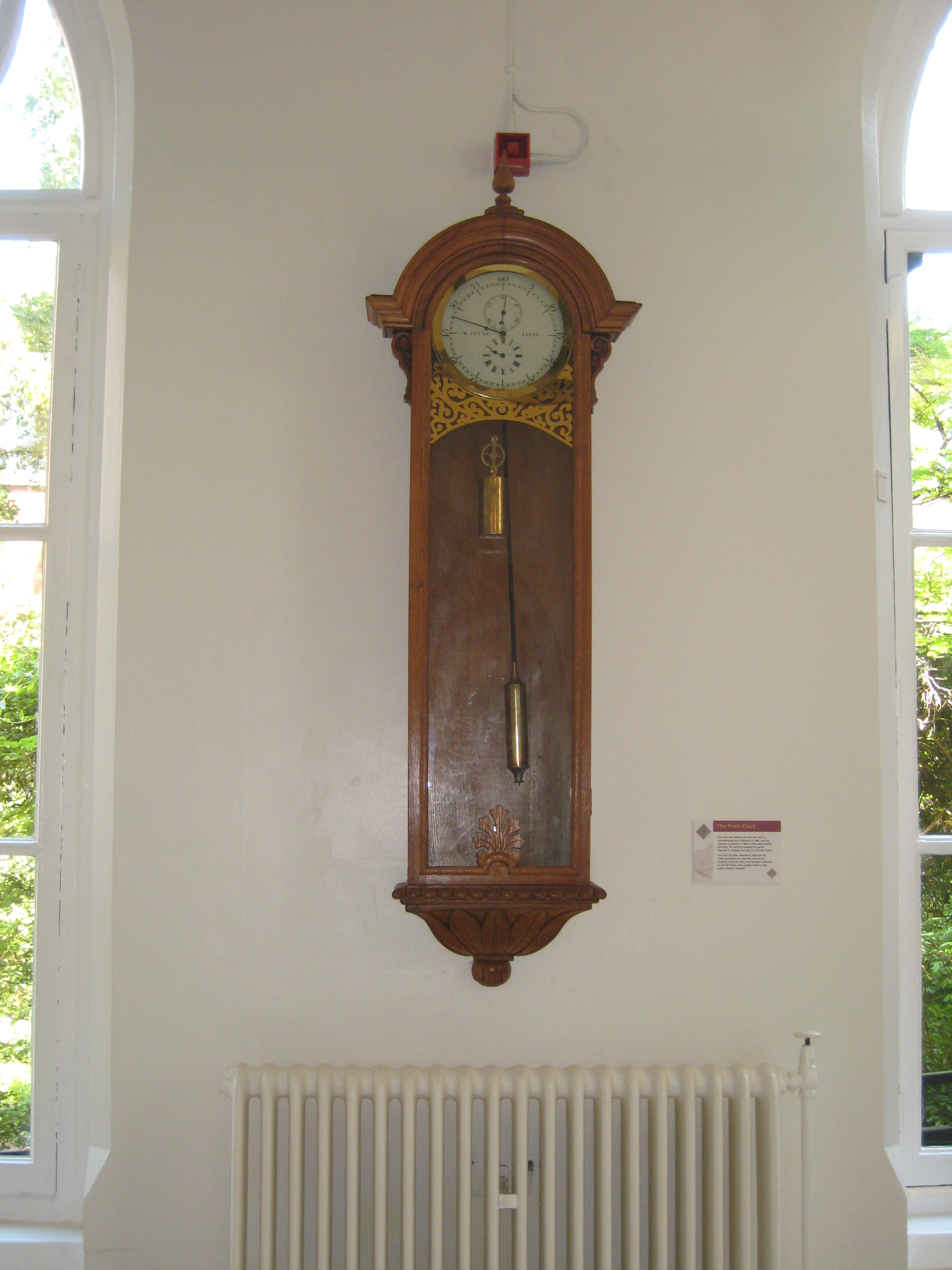
Potts clock

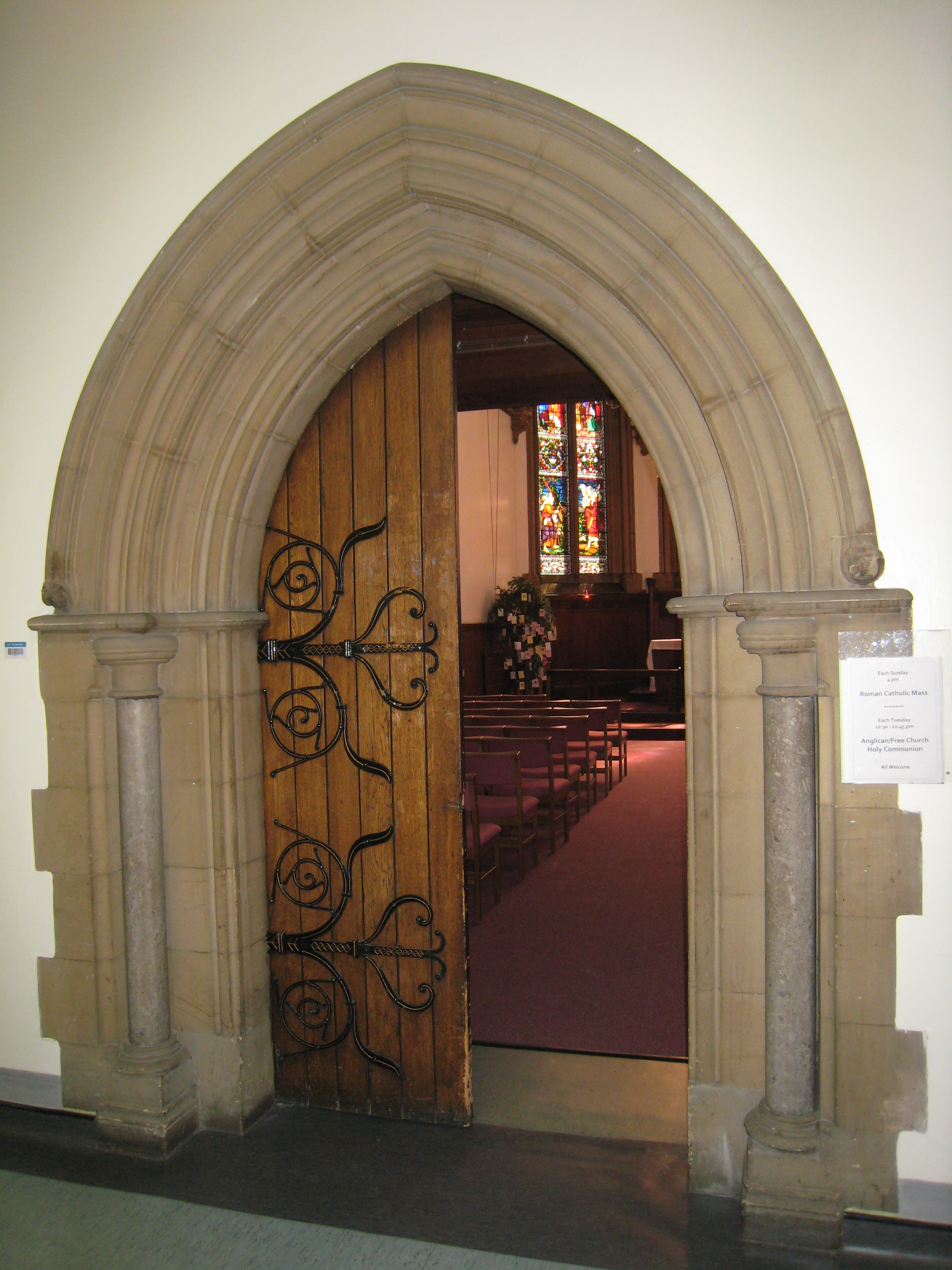
The Chapel

==== Other Victorian buildings ====
On the West of Thoresby Place is the School of Medicine, an 1893 Grade II* listed building by William Henry Thorp (1852–1944) in red brick, stone dressings and slate roofs in Perpendicular Revival style. Some of the entrance hall is lined with Burmantofts Faience.

In similar style is the 1897 Nurses' Home, also by Thorp, which is now north of the Brotherton Wing, and facing it on the entry road from Calverley Street.

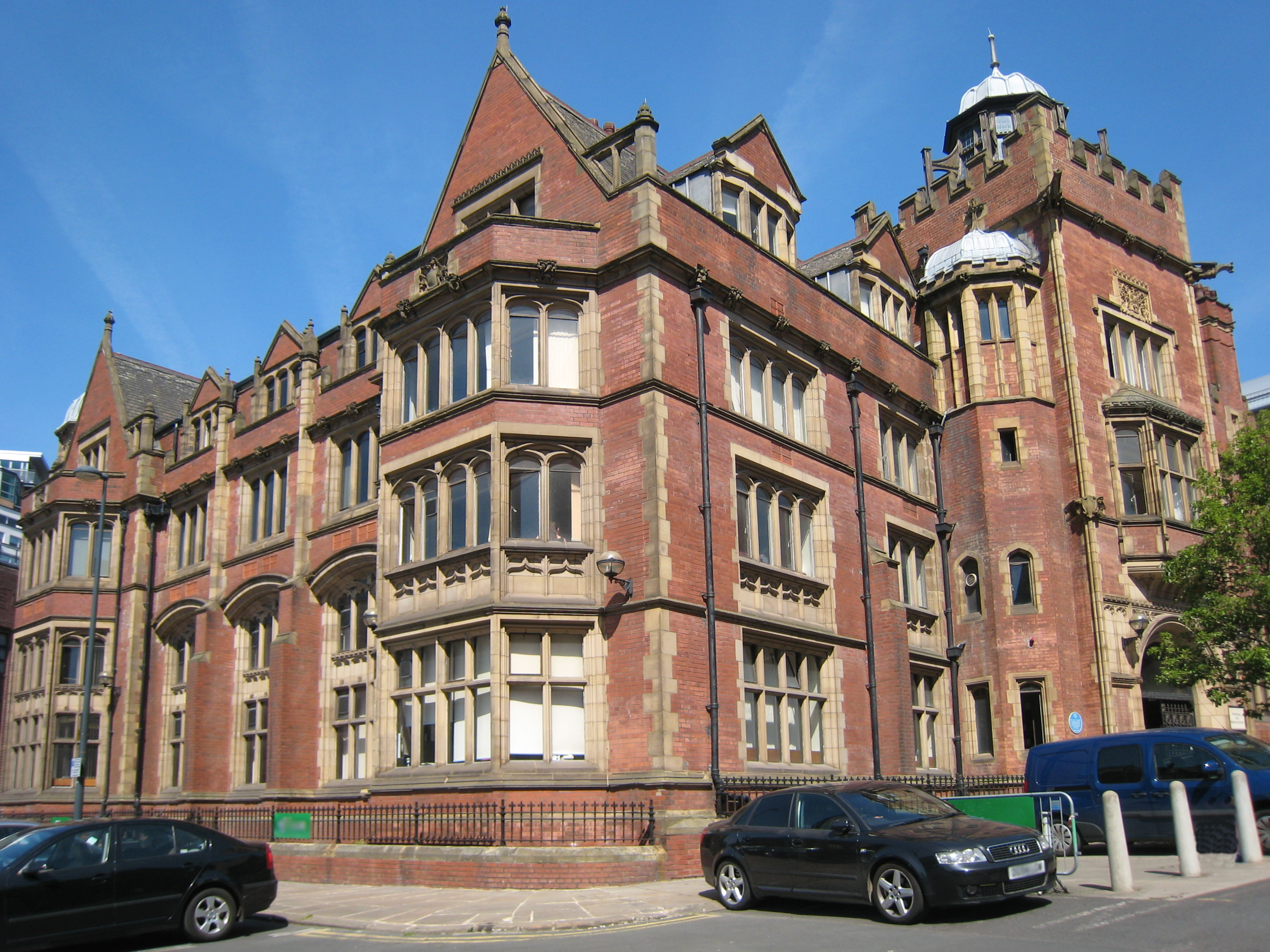
Leeds School of Medicine

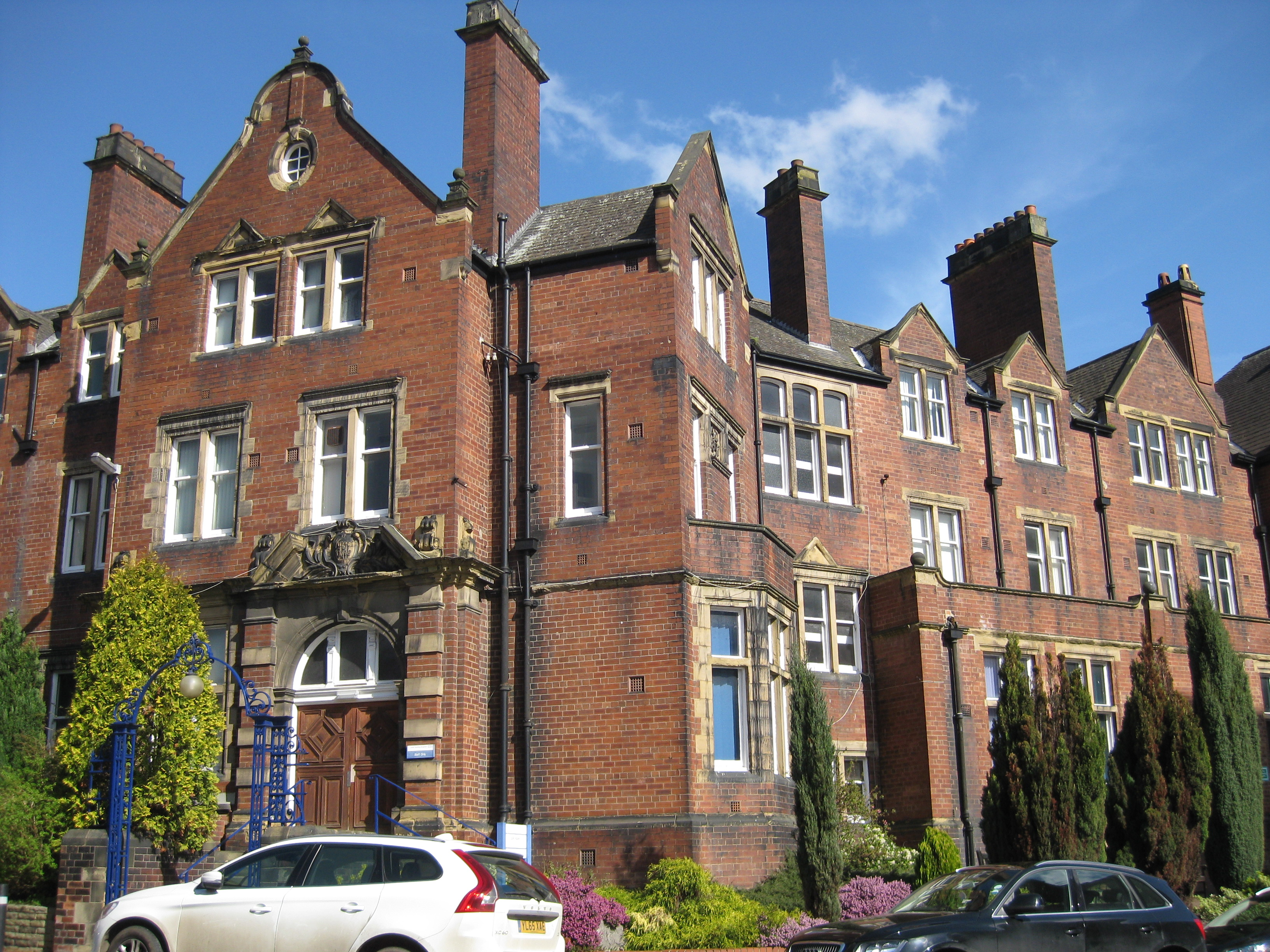
Nurses' Home

=== King Edward VII Memorial Extension ===
An appeal for the building of this extension was commenced in 1911. The project's general manager was F.J. Bray. Its treasurer was Charles Lupton who, along with his brothers - including Alderman F. M. Lupton and his daughter Olive and her husband Richard Noel Middleton - had promised to have made donations "up to the 15th of June, 1914". F. M. Lupton's niece, Miss Elinor G. Lupton (later Leeds Lady Mayoress), and his first cousin - Baroness von Schunck (née Kate Lupton) and her son-in-law Lord Airedale - also gave generous donations towards the extension scheme.

=== Brotherton Wing ===
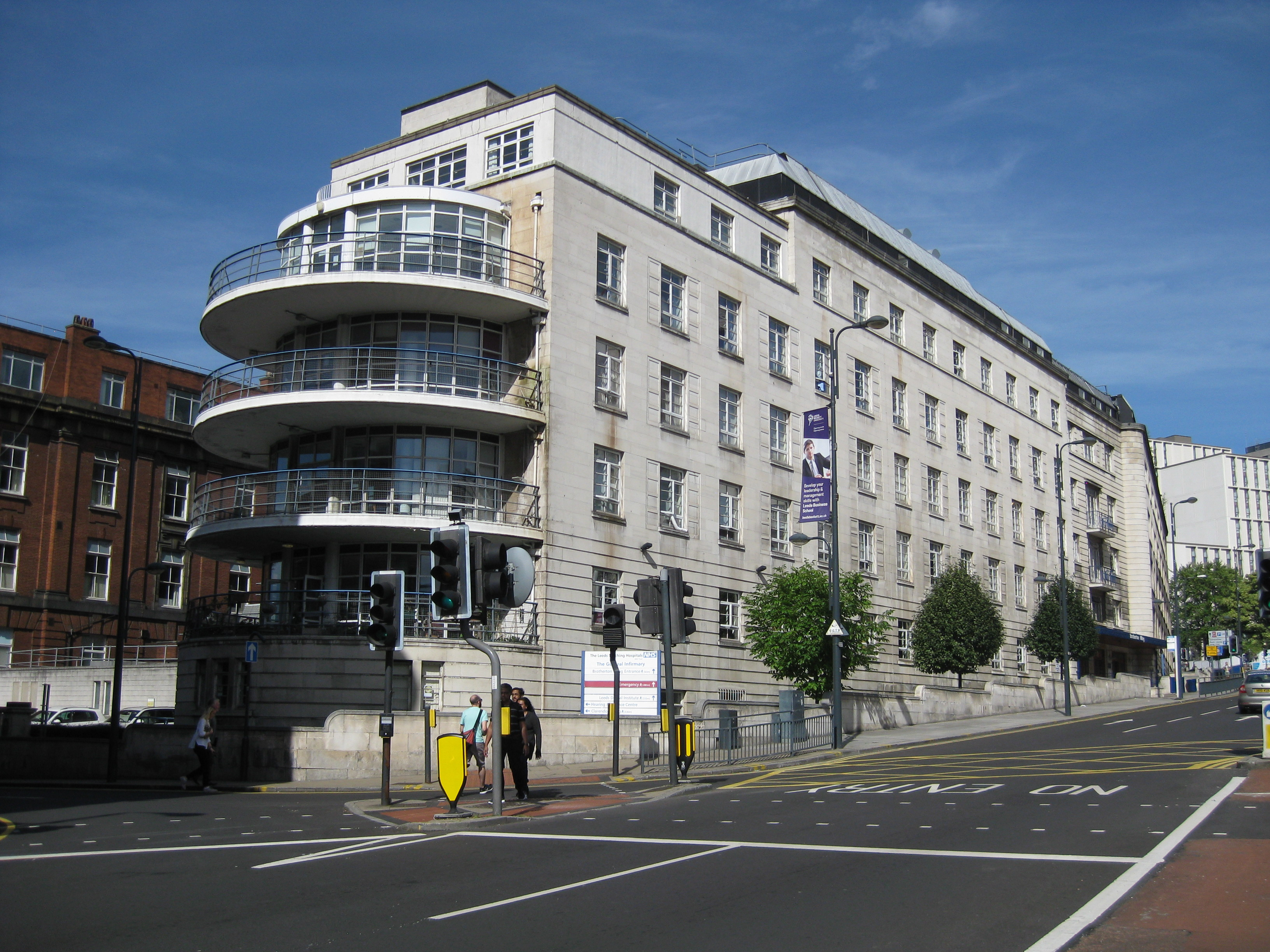
Brotherton Wing

The Brotherton Wing on Calverley Street is in Portland Stone, in keeping with the Leeds Civic Hall on the other side of the road. It was the gift of, and named after, Charles Frederick Ratcliffe Brotherton (1882–1949) and opened in 1940. First planned in 1926, in a then modern style, it has semi-circular balconies at the South End, where it was intended that patients would rest and enjoy fresh air, which did not prove to be the case because of the rise of the motor car and other pollution.

=== Clarendon Wing ===
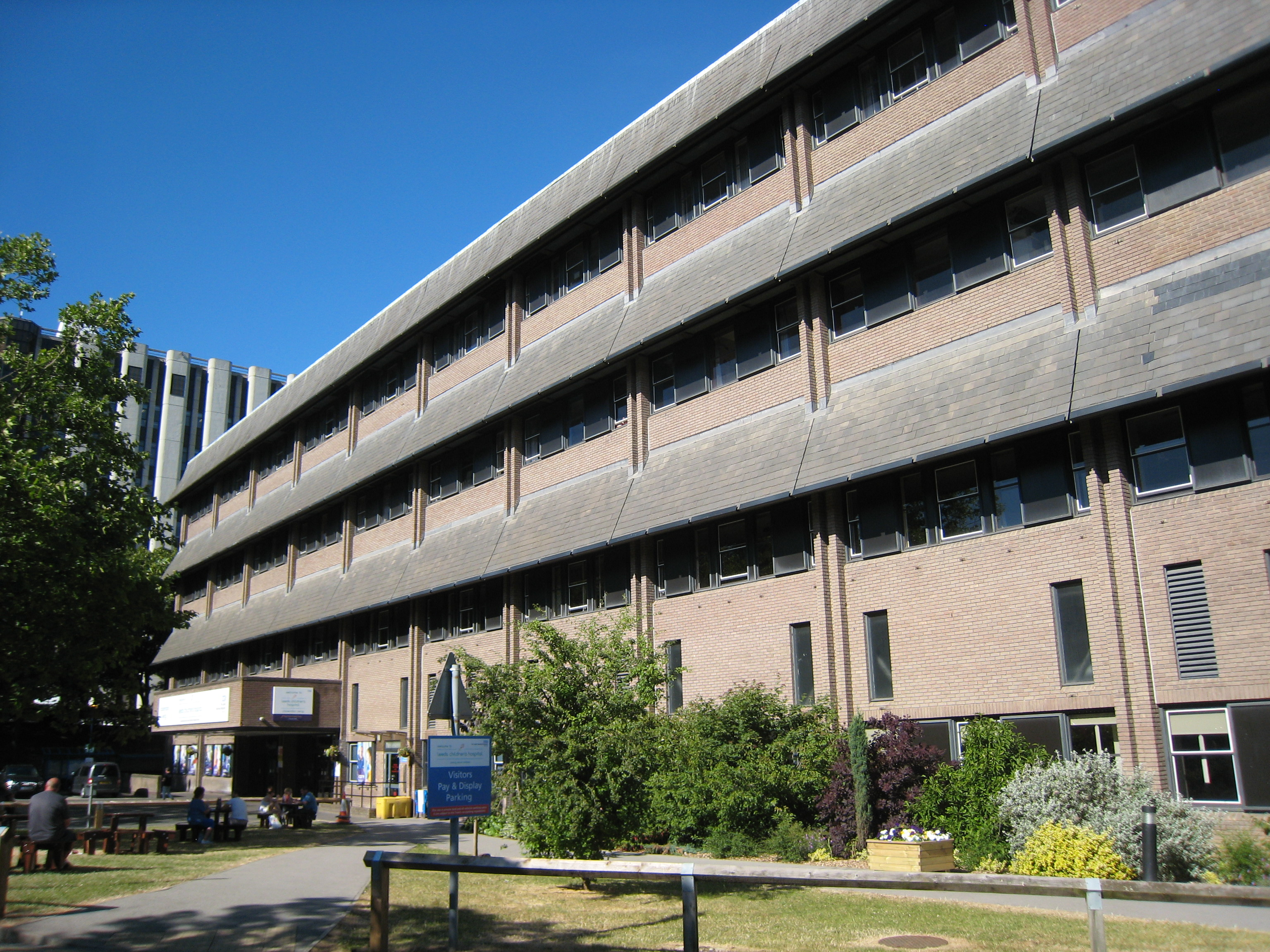
Clarendon Wing

This 1984 building is Leeds Children's Hospital. When first opened it replaced the old woman's hospital which was located about 1/4 mile away. This was built to be self governing from the rest of the main hospital. Clarendon wing had its own kitchens, laboratories, operating theatres and loading bay. It is separate building of dark brick and grey slate with four storeys around a central courtyard. The Leeds Inner Ring Road runs in a tunnel underneath it.

=== Jubilee Wing ===
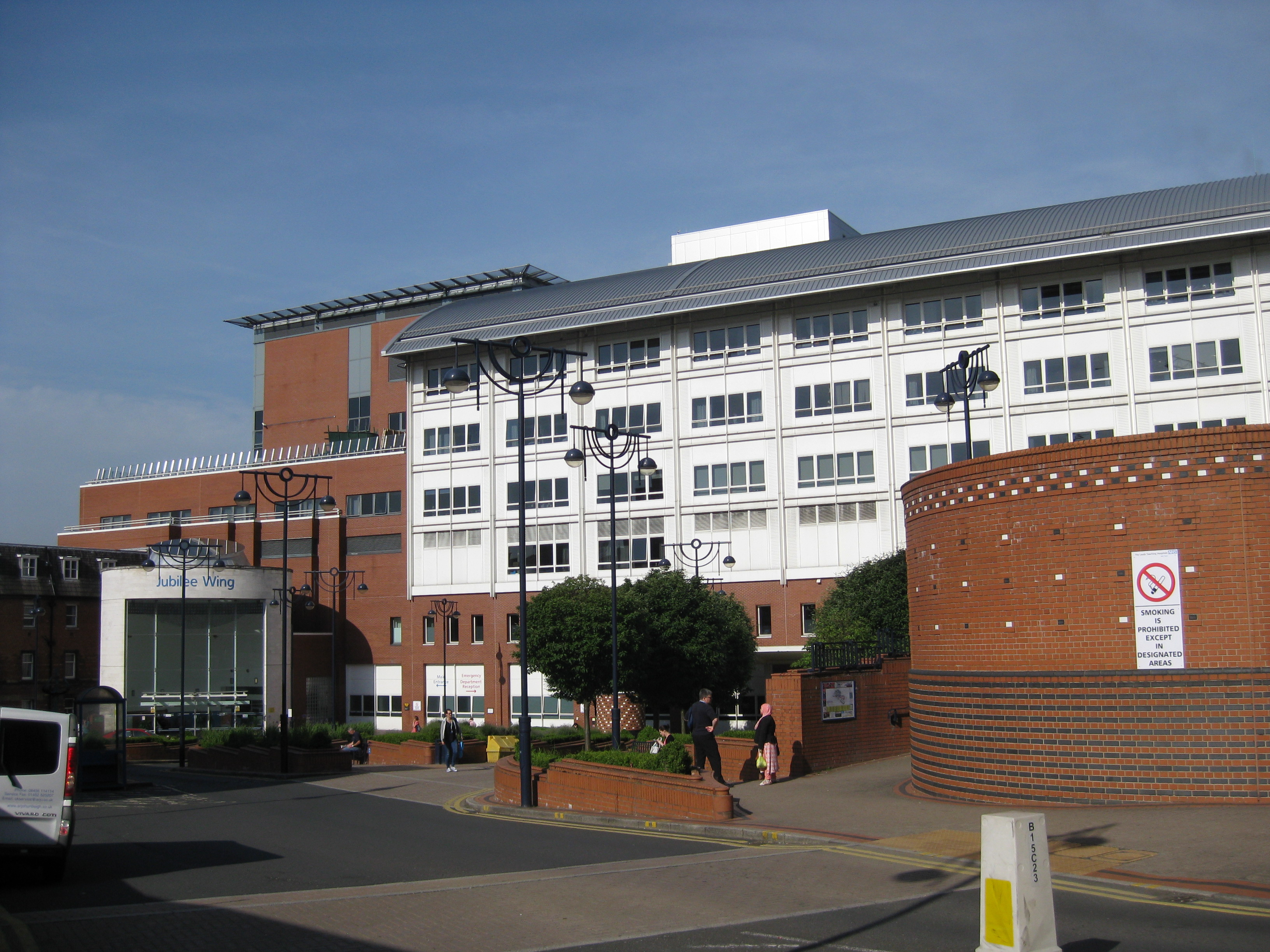
Jubilee Wing

The Jubilee Wing opened in 1998 at a cost of £92 million. It is both a major expansion in the form of a north extension to the hospital and also provides links between the various buildings, with a new major entrance off Clarendon Way. It has an L-shaped plan of seven storeys in red brick and white metal cladding and barrel vaulted roofs. There is a large curved glazed entrance. Outside, the practicalities of vehicle and pedestrian traffic are dealt with in Jubilee Square, landscaped in decorative brickwork by Tess Jaray with flower beds and sculptures by Tom Lomax. It has a helicopter landing pad for the Yorkshire Air Ambulance Service.

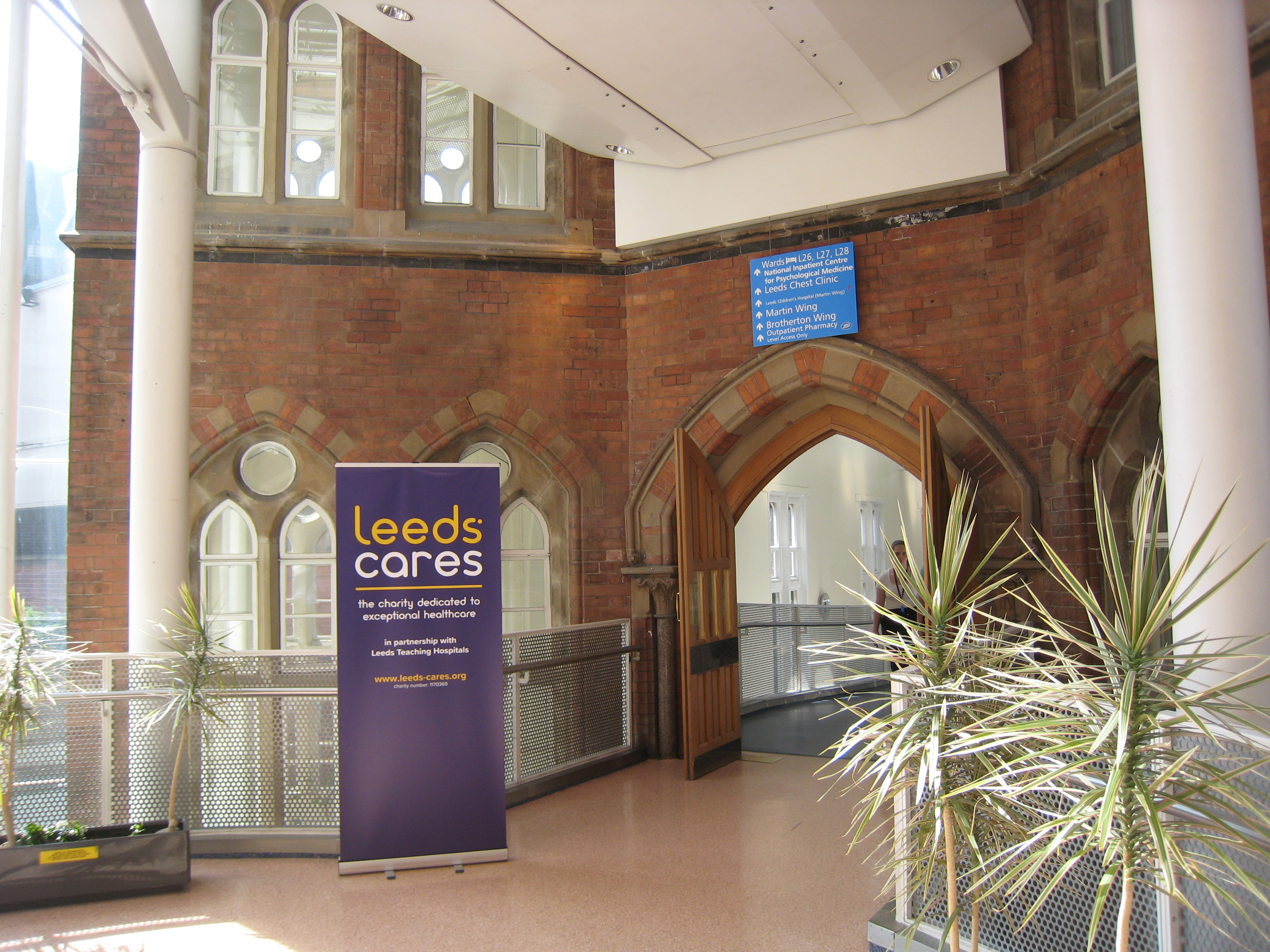
Connecting the old buildings with the new

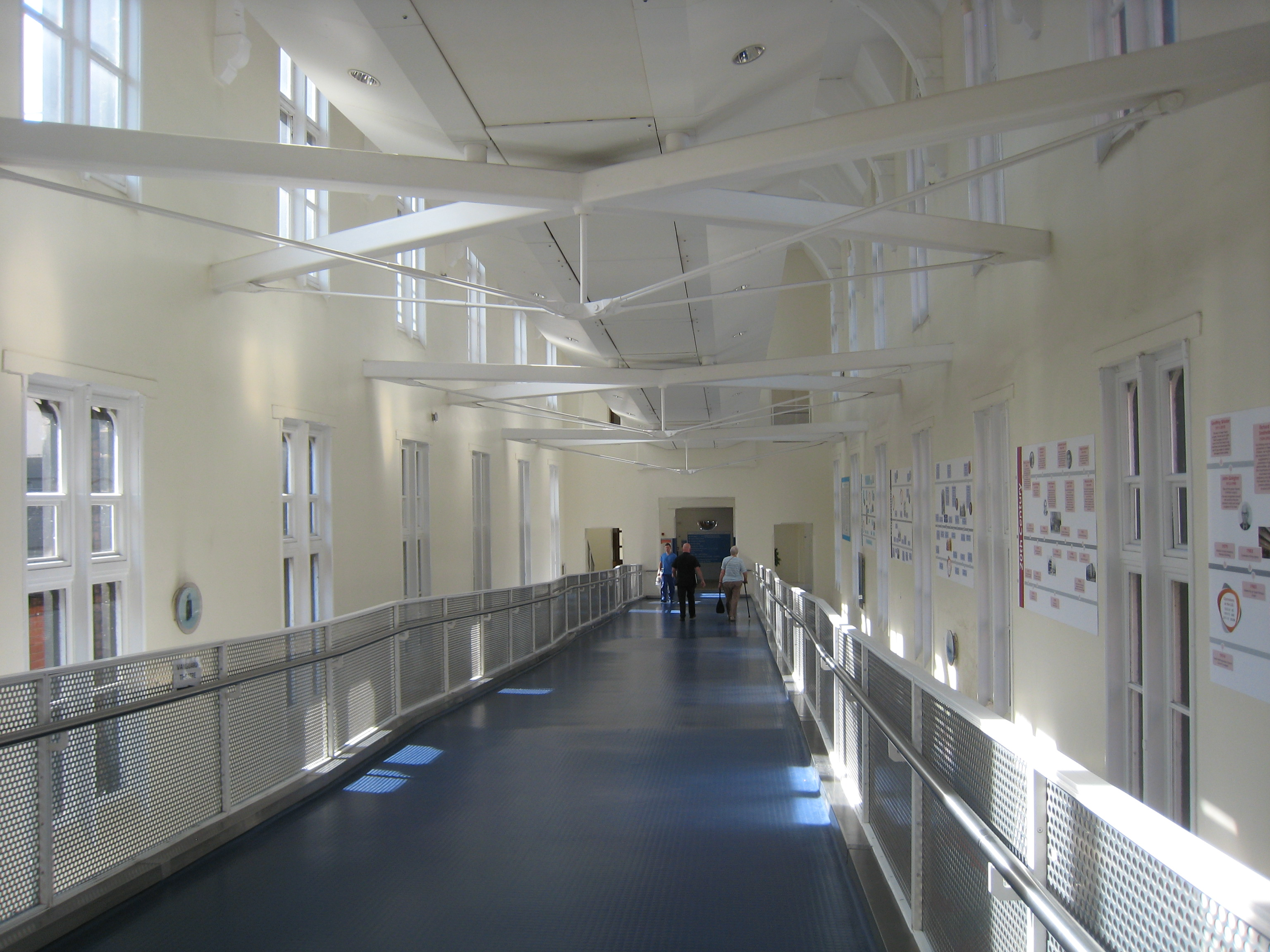
One of the bridging corridors between buildings

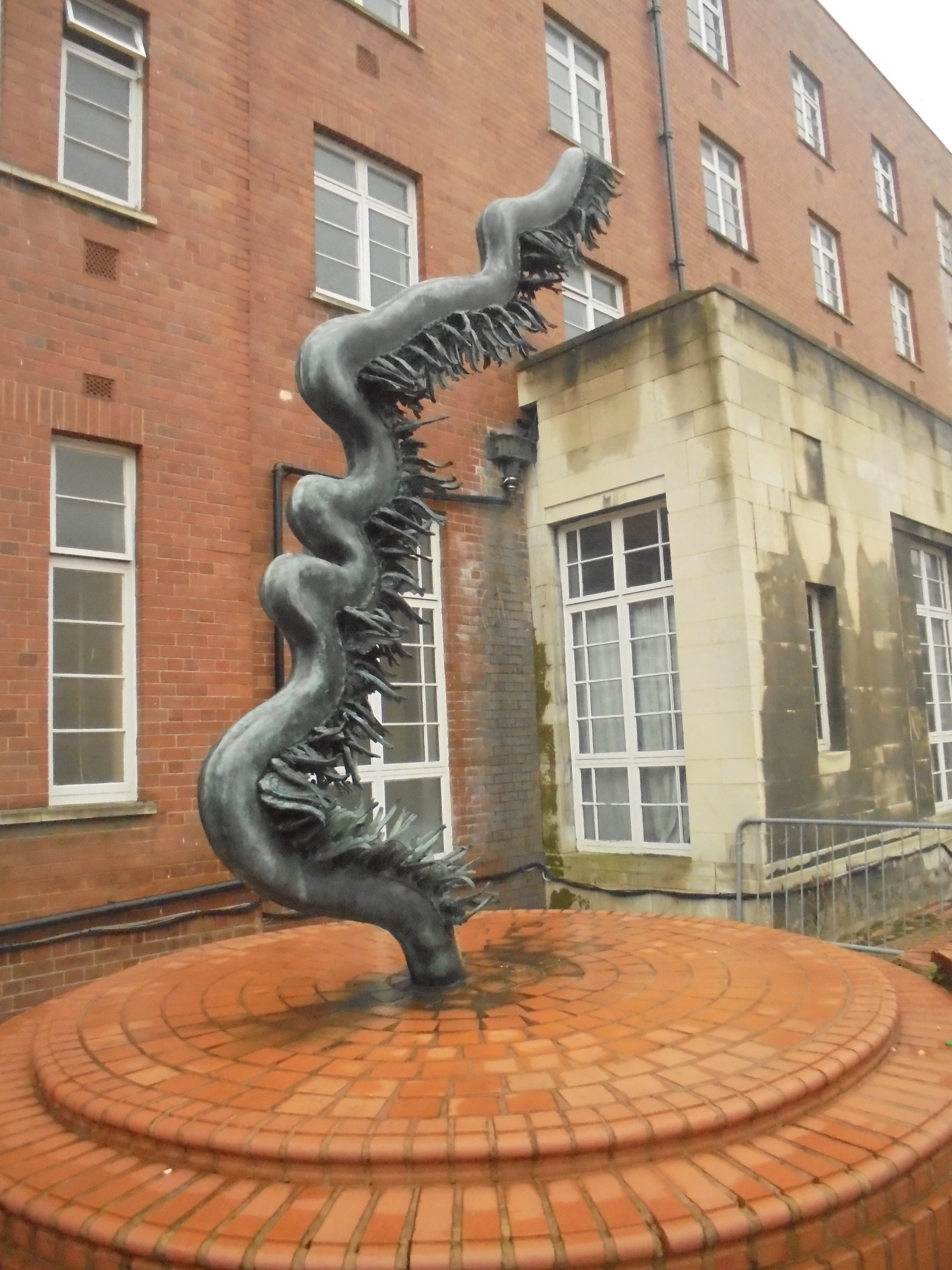
One of the sculptures outside the Jubilee Wing

== Famous and infamous people associated with the hospital ==
These are as follows:

- Lucy Duff Grant (1894–1984) OBE, RRC, principal tutor for the school of nursing and then assistant matron (1922 to 1929), later president of the Royal College of Nursing (1951 to 1953), president of the National Council of Nurses (1951 to 1957), vice president of the International Council of Nurses (1953 to 1957) and elected member of the General Nursing Council for England and Wales (1937 to 1955).
- John Goligher, world renowned colorectal surgeon and professor of surgery from 1955 to 1978.
- Between 20 September 2006 and 28 September 2006 the Top Gear presenter Richard Hammond was treated at the hospital after suffering critical injuries as a result of a jet power car crash whilst filming at the airfield at ex-RAF Elvington near York.
- Berkeley Moynihan, 1st Baron Moynihan, Pioneer in abdominal surgery.
- Colin Norris, serial killer nurse who in 2002 murdered two patients at the hospital and attempted to murder another before being transferred to St James's University Hospital across the city and killing two others
- Nancy Roper, founder of the used widely Roper-Logan-Tierney model of nursing, became a state registered nurse at the hospital in 1943.
- Sydney Clayton Fryers, was House Governor and Secretary, awarded a CBE for his work at the hospital in 1948. He represented the British Hospitals Association and Employers on the Nurses Salaries Committee chaired by Lord Rushcliffe which published two reports in 1943
- Jimmy Savile, serial sex offender and BBC personality who was a volunteer porter at the hospital, who sexually abused individuals there, as well as performing sex acts on dead bodies in the hospital mortuary.
- Former Countdown host Richard Whiteley OBE was treated at the hospital and died on 26 June 2005 following heart problems two days after an unsuccessful operation for endocarditis.

== Services ==
The LGI is the designated major trauma centre for adults and children in West Yorkshire and one of the busiest in the UK, being rated in the top three in the country for providing the highest quality specialist care for patients with complex and often life-threatening multiple injuries.

Cardiac services are also located in the Jubilee wing and include some of the largest services in the country for Transcatheter Aortic Valve Implantation (TAVI).

The LGI has a large and busy Emergency Department for adults, and next to it is a separate dedicated facility for children up of the age of 16, adjacent to the facilities of the Leeds Children's Hospital. The department was featured in the first ever live broadcast from an A&E department as part of prime time ITV documentary, A&E Live. Hosted by Davina McCall, the programme was broadcast live from the LGI Emergency Department for three consecutive nights in celebration of the NHS 70th birthday. The programmes gave an unprecedented insight into the workings of the hospitals and partner services in Leeds.

It is the regional tertiary centre for Neurosciences, which includes services for spinal surgery, neurosurgery, neurology, neuro-rehabilitation, neurophysiology and stroke. The Leeds Teaching Hospitals NHS Trust was the first regional stroke centre in the UK to adopt the RapidAI advanced imaging platform across various sites in its stroke network.

Professor Simon Kay and his team were the first in the country to perform the first double hand transplants, thanks to pioneering expert care by the teams on the hand and plastics units at Leeds General Infirmary. In 2016, Chris King was the first person in the UK to have a double hand transplant. and in 2018 Tania Jackson became the first woman in the UK to have a double hand transplant.

The pathology labs, based in the Old Medical School at LGI, process thousands of samples every day. Prime Minister Boris Johnson visited the pathology services to hear about future plans following an announcement by the Department of Health of £12m additional funding to develop a single Laboratory Information Management System (LIMS) across West Yorkshire and Harrogate.

== See also ==
- List of hospitals in England
- Grade I listed buildings in West Yorkshire
- Listed buildings in Leeds (City and Hunslet Ward - northern area)
