= Goodbear =

British comedy duo

Comedy career
- Years active: 2015–present
- Medium: Theatre; television; internet
- Genres: Double-act; sketch comedy
- Website: goodbearcomedy.com

Goodbear is a sketch comedy double act composed of Joe Barnes and Henry Perryment.

Their 2019 show Dougal was nominated for 'Best Show' at the 2019 Edinburgh Comedy Awards.

== Formation ==
Barnes and Perryment met at Leeds University, where they were members of The Leeds Tealights. In 2012, their Leeds Tealights Edinburgh show Sexy Chubby was directed by Jamie Demetriou.

== Edinburgh (2015–present) ==
Goodbear's debut fringe show was at the 2015 Fringe. Since then, they have received critical acclaim from The Guardian, The Sunday Times, The Telegraph, The Scotsman, Chortle, and many more. Their live shows are directed by George Chilcott, artistic director of Dugout Theatre, and accompanied by an original score by Max Perryment.

In 2019, their show Dougal was nominated for 'Best Comedy Show' at the Dave Edinburgh Comedy Awards, presented by Rose Matafeo and Stephen Fry. In 2020, Dougal was also nominated for a Chortle Award.

== Other work ==
In 2025, their comedy drama Lyra was broadcast on BBC Radio 4. In it, Barnes and Perryment were joined by Rose Matafeo, Charlotte Ritchie, and Ed Kear. It won the award for Best Comedy Drama at the 2026 BBC Audio Drama Awards.
