= Leeds Student Radio =

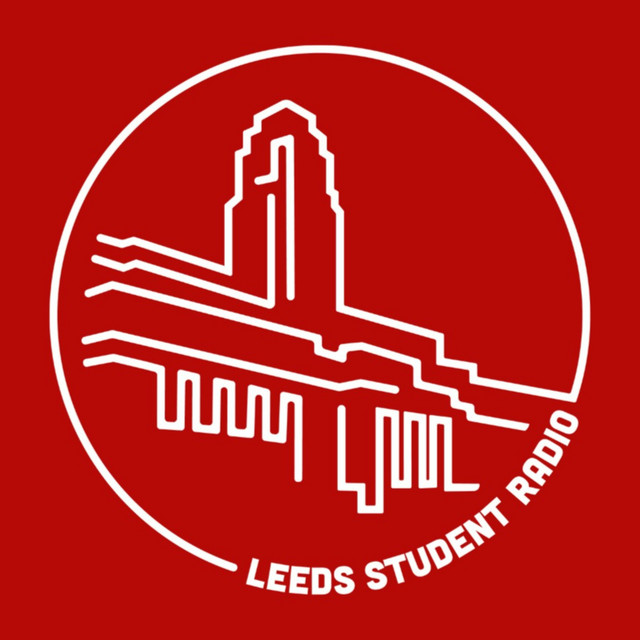
- Leeds; England
- Frequency: Everyday during term time

Programming
- Format: Online (thisislsr.com)
- Affiliations: Student Radio Association; Leeds University Union

History
- First air date: 1968

Links
- Website: thisislsr.com

Leeds Student Radio is a student radio station broadcasting every day during term time from Leeds University Union at the University of Leeds.

It is also the official student radio station for Leeds Trinity University and Leeds College of Music. The station broadcasts online through its website.

The station is run by an elected committee of student volunteers, and the management of the station is overseen by a full-time station manager employed by Leeds University Union. The station also provides live DJs for venues within Leeds University Union and the City of Leeds.

== Formation ==
In the 1960s a group of students formed 'Network 4' and broadcast black-and-white programmes on a closed circuit around the university.

In 1968, Leeds University Union built a radio studio with an adjoining control room on the top floor of the students' union building.

It was built so that 'Network 4' could produce programmes for BBC Radio Leeds, with student productions including concerts, debates and dramas as well as a weekly 30-minute news programme called 'University City'.

In the late 1990s, TV presenter Anita Rani worked at the radio station.

=== Studios ===
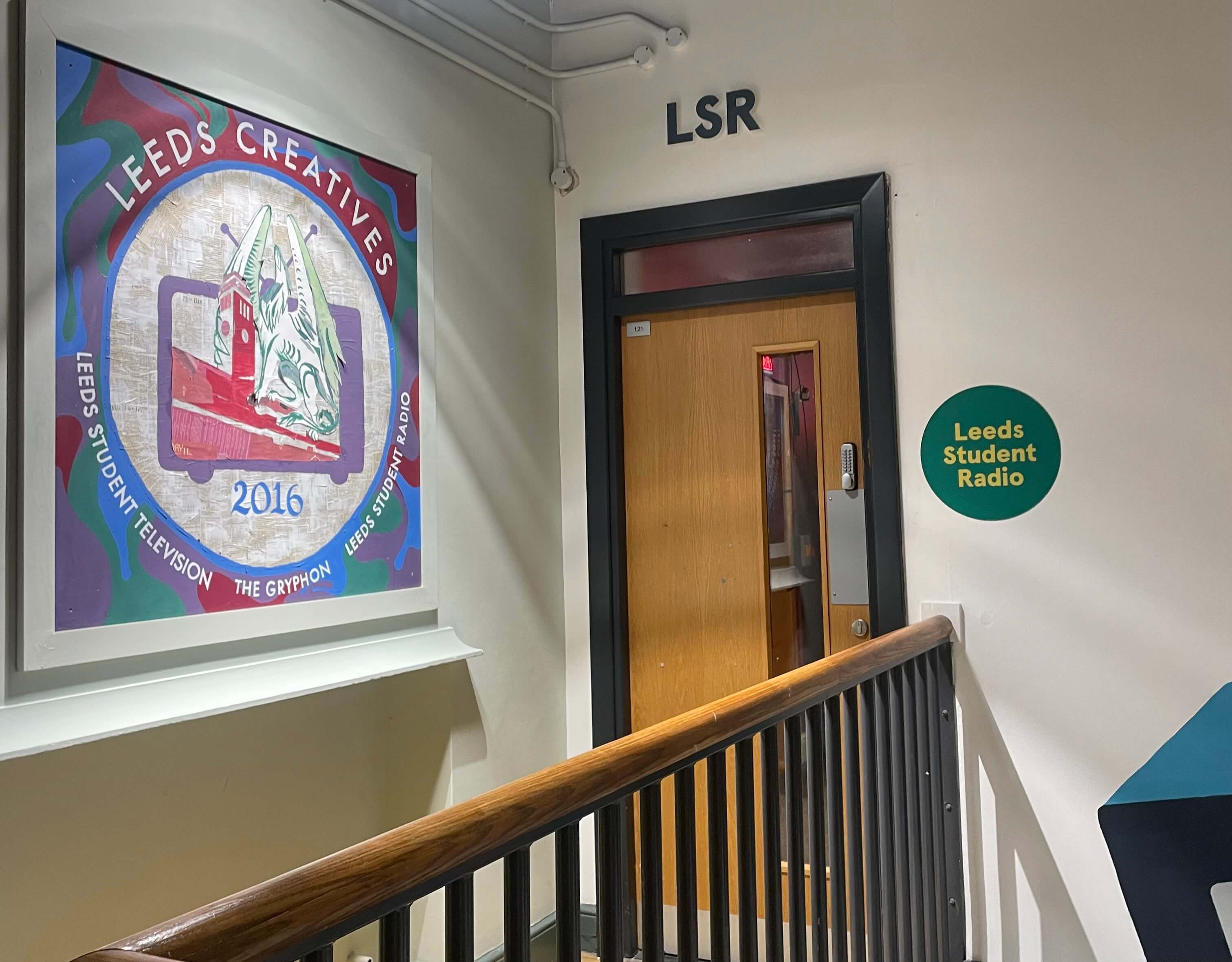
LSR studio in the LUU

The station has a permanent office on the first floor of Leeds University Union which overlooks the main entrance to the Union. There are two studios, one that broadcasts live and a DJ and production studio.

== Content ==
The Leeds Student Radio schedule consists of several core shows and individually-run shows which members can apply for each semester. The schedule is determined for Semester 1 in September and Semester 2 in January by the station manager, the programme controller and the core show editors. Antonia Quirke, writing in the New Statesman, described the on air content as "[an] easy joy in the medium" and celebrated the individual DJs and their programmes.

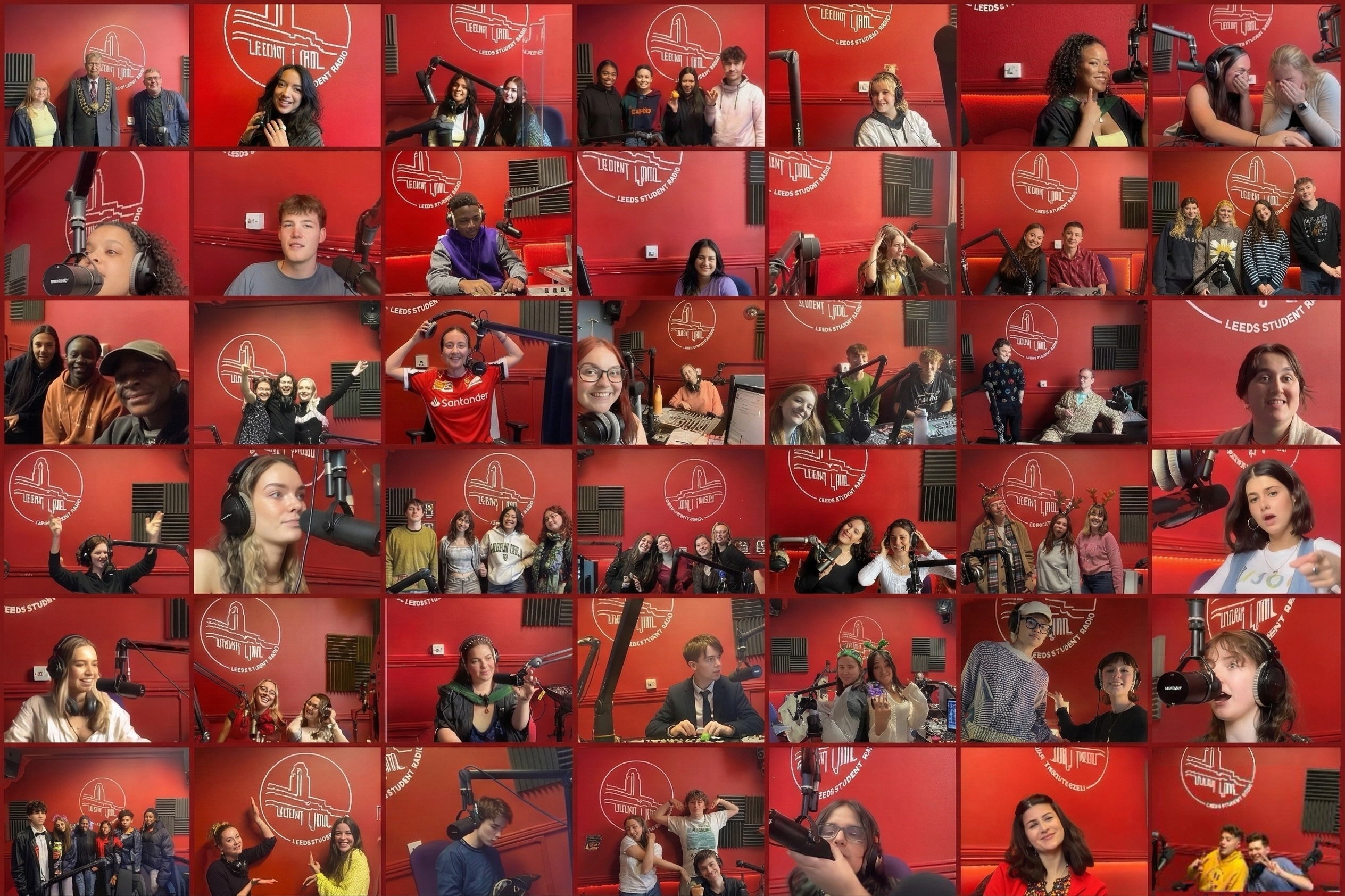
Collage of our show hosts

== Station managers ==
As a result of the SAR (Student Activity Review) carried out by Leeds University Union, since 2007 the Station Manager of Leeds Student Radio has been an appointed post rather than an elected one, with candidates facing an interview panel.

The application process consists of a presentation from the candidates, followed by a question-and-answer session, which all members of Leeds Student Radio are welcome to attend. This is followed by an interview with the panel. The first manager selected using this process was Richard Andrews.

== See also ==
- Student Radio Association
- Student Radio Awards
- The Gryphon
