= Leeds University Union =

Student union representing students at the University Of Leeds

Coordinates: 53°48′24″N 01°33′24″W

- Institution: University of Leeds
- Location: Lifton Place, University Square, Leeds, LS2 9JZ
- Established: 1877 (as the Yorkshire College Students Association)
- CEO: Aidan Grills
- Executive officers: Amara Relf; Shivani Gug; Lydia Shale; Katrina Liu; Safiyah Farid; Eden Morris
- Affiliations: National Union of Students, British Universities Sports Association, Aldwych Group
- Website: www.luu.org.uk

Leeds University Union (LUU) is the representative body for the students at the University of Leeds, England.

It is led by a group of student sabbatical officers known as the Student Executive, and supported by around 140 full-time staff members, with up to 500 student members of staff at peak times, as well as hundreds of dedicated volunteers. The organisation's aim is to ensure that students love their time at Leeds, by representing, supporting and advising students to improve their academic experience and welfare, and through the provision of social activities. LUU represents students and their interests to the University of Leeds, as well as on a local and national scale.

It was the first Students' Union in the country to be re-verified as 'Excellent' in the NUS Quality Students' Union accreditation in 2019, and continues to hold a Green Impact award at "Excellent" standard and the highest possible standard for the Best Bar None quality mark.

== History ==
The current Union has its roots in the various societies of the Yorkshire College, a college which joined the federal Victoria University in 1887. The Yorkshire College Students Association was the first such society, founded in 1877. In 1890, a single consolidated body was formed to manage and fund the various societies. Rooms and areas within University buildings, which at the time consisted mainly of converted townhouses, were used as common rooms and meeting spaces until 1937 when work began on the current University Union building. Completed in 1939, it was made possible by a large financial donation from W Riley-Smith of Tadcaster. The building was extended in the 1960s as part of the Chamberlin, Powell and Bon development plan for the university campus, and again in the late 1990s.

The representative function of the Union developed later, with no reference to the representation of the student body being included in the university's initial charter in 1904. From 1944, presidents and vice-presidents of the Union were made members of the University Council, to represent student opinion and inform students of the operations of the Council.

== Facilities ==
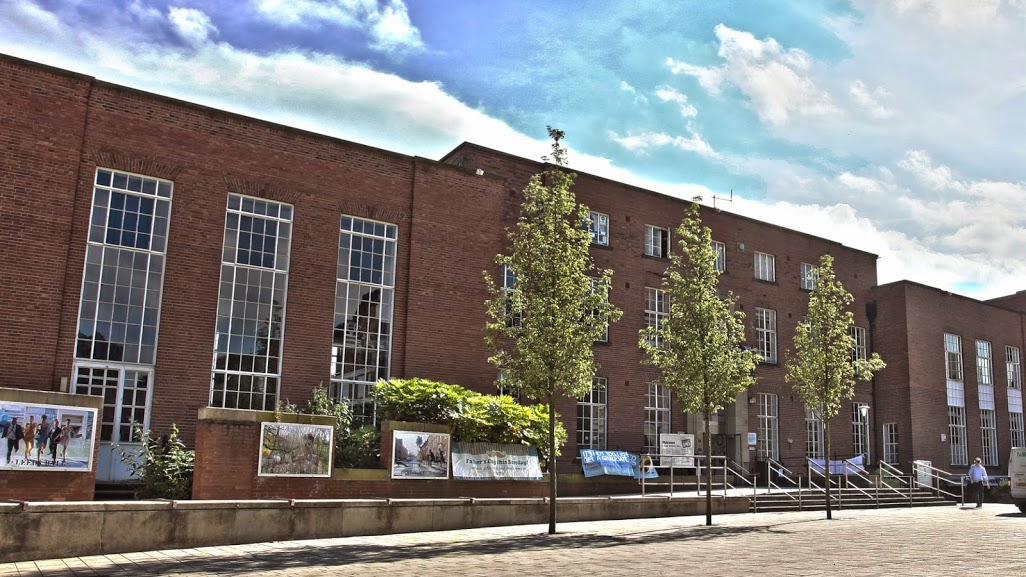
The outside of the Leeds University Union building in 2014

The Union houses a variety of services, which work towards its aim of representing, supporting and advising students. These services are funded partly by a grant from the university and partly through income from the Union's commercial operations, which consist of a number of retail outlets, bars and nightclubs within the building. As a not-for-profit charity, all money it earns goes back into making what it refers to as 'a better Union'.

=== Services ===
The Union's Advice & Wellbeing service (previously Student Advice and Student Advice Centre) provides specialist advice to students on a range of matters including housing, money, academic and personal or wellbeing concerns, and can offer general advice and financial support. Help and Support also provides advocacy services for academic appeals and works closely with the university on many projects. They also have a team of student Health and Wellbeing Ambassadors, who run events on campus and create wellbeing-focused resources for students

Meanwhile, the Faculty Engagement team works to represent students' academic interests to the university. Working with student representatives from each school and level of study, they ensure members' voices are heard by the university to secure a quality educational experience for every student.

Clubs and societies are supported by the Union's Student Groups team, which manages more than 340 clubs and societies. Student Activities also manages the Union's Give It A Go programme and administers the allocation of grant funding to societies. Societies range in topic and include the likes of RAG and Nightline as well as student media groups such as Leeds Student, Leeds Student Radio and Leeds Student Television.

Joblink is an employment agency, which any registered student can access and use. The service lists both permanent jobs and temporary work deemed suitable for students, and also runs workshops aimed at improving employability.

The Union also operates a Minibus Safety Service, called the Nightbus which takes students home from the Union at a charge of only £1. They are also proud to have a partnership with local taxi provider Amber Cars which includes an arrangement to ensure students can get home safely at night when they are not carrying cash.

=== Retail ===
The Union operates four retail outlets within its building:

- LUU Co-op, a franchise of The Co-operative Group (opened April 2019)
- Union Shop, a shop selling stationery, cards, gifts and art supplies (opened August 2019)
- Gear, a clothing and gift shop selling University of Leeds branded merchandise.

A number of other retail units are let to external companies, including Humpit, Pearls Bubble Tea, Proper Pasty Company, Pamper Me salon, Bayfields Opticians and Wok&Go.

=== Bars and Venues ===
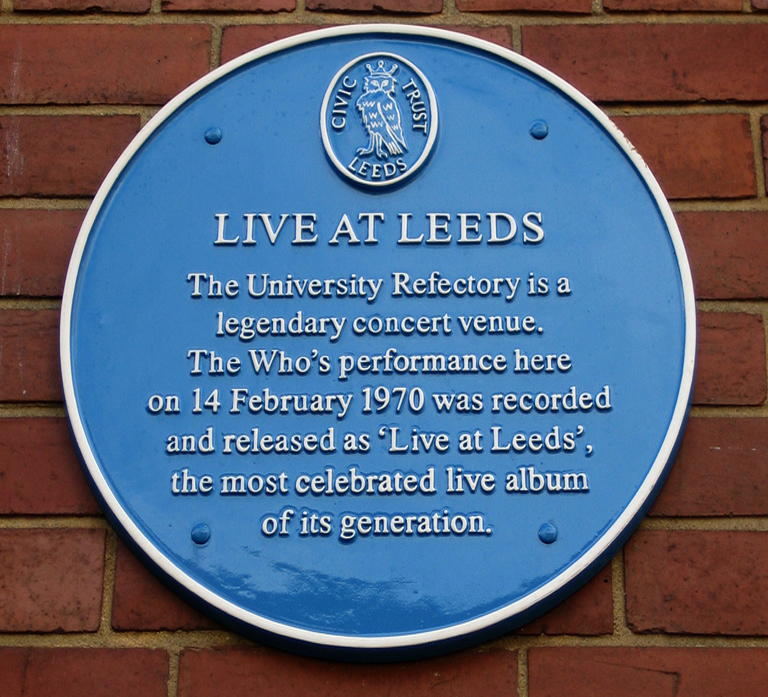
Blue plaque commemorating the recording of Live at Leeds by The Who

The building is home to two bars (Old Bar and Terrace), and a coffee shop Common Ground (formerly Hidden Cafe), which are all open during the day serving a variety of food and drinks. The bars are also open every night, and host regular events such as karaoke nights and pub quizzes. Much-loved by students, Old Bar specialises in local and real ale, pub grub and sports screenings, and is Cask Marque accredited. Both Old Bar and Terrace are Best Bar None Gold accredited.

Three nightclubs are present on the site, the largest of which is Stylus which was opened in the early 2000s. Alongside this are two smaller clubs, Pyramid (formerly Mine) and Function (formerly Pulse, formerly Bar Coda). During club nights, these venues are opened in various combinations depending on the expected audience - for instance, all three are opened for the weekly club night Fruity, while fewer rooms are open for external clubnights Club Tropicana and Brouhaha. The clubs - primarily Stylus - are also used as concert venues, with the university's adjoining Refectory used for larger events. These include The Who (who recorded Live at Leeds there originally in 1970, and returned in June 2006 to recreate the original show - the concert booklet for which listed the gig history of the venue), Bob Marley and the Wailers (as heard on the remastered 2004 Deluxe edition of Burnin'), Jimi Hendrix, Led Zeppelin, Pink Floyd, and The Rolling Stones. More contemporary artists to grace the stage have included Ed Sheeran, Bastille, Muse (recorded and played on MTV), The Strokes, Bloc Party, KT Tunstall and Arctic Monkeys, with the venue's most recent shows performed by Sleaford Mods, Fontaines D.C, Freya Ridings, Stefflon Don and Little Simz.

=== Other spaces ===
The Riley Smith Theatre (formerly Riley Smith Hall), refurbished in 2005 and 2016, is the largest proscenium theatre on the university campus and is used by student societies for performances, as well as being the main venue of the Backstage Society who provide technical and stage management services; also the venue for Live at Leeds, the John Martyn album, recorded in 1975. Pyramid Theatre (formerly Raven Theatre) is a theatre in the round located underground to the rear of the building, built in the 1960s as a debating chamber.

== Media ==
Leeds Student logo, the 2009 Guardian Student Newspaper of the Year

LUU has one of the country's most active university newspapers, The Gryphon (formerly Leeds Student until its renaming to its original name of "The Gryphon" in 2014). It is currently published monthly, on the third Wednesday of each month, during term time. The website is updated daily.

Leeds Student was formed by the merger of the Leeds University Union newspaper (Union News) and the Leeds Metropolitan University Students Union newspaper, but in November 2005 the Leeds Met students voted to disaffiliate from Leeds Student citing under-representation as the reason.

The Union is home to a number of zines, including Lippy, an alternative magazine; Onbeat, a collective for women of colour, non-binary people of colour and ethnic minorities based in Leeds; HerCampus, a women's magazine; and The Scribe, a creative arts magazine. They create a mix of print editions and online content, often working in collaboration to deliver comprehensive and varied content.

LUU has a student radio station, Leeds Student Radio. The station is widely active in LUU and often provides live DJs for union events. They produce a variety of content including specialist music shows, news bulletins, drivetime entertainment, live mixing and much more. Any member of LSR can propose their very own show and they encourage and develop a diverse array of content. Leeds Student Radio has a dedicated committee of around 20 members, and is one of the largest student stations in the country, boasting over 300 members. Many of its members have gone on to careers in radio and television.

There is also an internal TV station, LSTV, which broadcasts online and on televisions located around the Union building including in the Terrace and the Old Bar. LSTV broadcast live every Wednesday during term-time from their studio within the building itself, and present popular live broadcasts online for important LUU events. LSTV have been successful in winning awards through the student TV association NaSTA winning 9 awards in 2010 including best broadcaster. Graduates have gone on to work at Sky, IMG, and the BBC. They meet every Thursday to develop their ideas for programmes.

LUU also has a Film Making Society that creates video and film content, and teaches technical skills such as script writing, directing and shooting films.

== Jack Straw ==
Jack Straw, former Foreign Secretary, was famously President of Leeds University Union in 1967–68. Before that, he was (with Carol Ball) one of two Vice Presidents under President Mervyn Saunders. Whilst President, Straw played a role in taking over the leadership of a student sit-in (which he had initially opposed) in June 1968. In 2000, a motion was passed at the LUU Annual General Meeting strongly criticising Straw, then Home Secretary, for his part in the Asylum and Immigration Bill, the attempted removal of trial by jury (for some defendants) and legal aid in many cases, the anti-terrorism bill, the curfew on teenagers, mandatory drug testing for criminal suspects, and his attitude towards cannabis and tuition fees. Simon Rothstein, who proposed the motion, noted that the organisations that have condemned Straw included the Bar Council. He also pointed out that Mrs Thatcher had said, "I trust Jack Straw. He is a very fair man." The motion revoked Jack Straw's life membership of the union, banned him from the union building and called on the university to withdraw Straw's honorary degree.

In September 2007, the Communications and Internal Affairs Officer, Neil Mackenzie, put forward a motion to reinstate Jack Straw's name on the Presidents' Board in Old Bar, but this fell at Union Council. In November 2007, a motion was put to a referendum of the entire student body over whether to reinstate Jack Straw's membership of the union and have his name returned to the Presidents' Board. The motion passed by 1,175 votes to 423, meaning Jack Straw's life membership was reinstated and his name returned to the board of former Presidents.

== Union Upgrade (2015) ==
On 3 February 2015, Leeds University Union revealed a £20 million project to significantly update the Union building. Following successful University approval construction began in early 2016. The project was developed after several rounds of student feedback and consultation with significant upgrades to the Foyer, bars and venues, prayer spaces and meeting rooms, along with the brand-new Union Square and South Entrance planned. The upgrade was fully opened in September 2017.

They also revealed a major digital transformation, introducing a brand refresh and a dramatically revamped and notably user-first website.

== Affiliations ==
- Aldwych Group
- National Union of Students
