= White Rose University Consortium =

University partnership in Yorkshire, England

- Formation: 1997; 29 years ago
- Type: Consortium of United Kingdom-based universities
- Region served: Yorkshire, Northern England
- Members: University of Leeds; University of Sheffield; University of York
- Website: https://whiterose.ac.uk

The White Rose University Consortium is a partnership among three universities in Yorkshire, England consisting of the University of Leeds, the University of Sheffield, and the University of York.

== History ==
It was formed in 1997 to combine the resources of the universities so they can all benefit. These benefits include collaborative research, business opportunities, industrial partnerships, and joint postgraduate scholarships.

The consortium takes its name from the white rose traditionally associated with the House of York.

== Activities ==
The White Rose Consortium have also established an e-thesis repository, allowing the postgraduate research and doctoral student at the University of Leeds, University of Sheffield and University of York to upload their works to the database. The repository is part of a national and international network of online databases which enable access to research papers and proposals so that they can be found, read, cited and expanded upon.

The White Rose University Consortium and Sheffield Hallam University formed Myscience.co Ltd., which runs the National Science Learning Centre in York. This opened in March 2006, part of the Science Learning Centres.

=== White Rose University Press ===
The White Rose University Press, established in 2016, is an open access digital university press run jointly by the three members of the White Rose Libraries collaboration. It publishes academic texts of various kinds, including monographs, conference proceedings, and academic journals. It currently publishes five journals:

- British and Irish Orthoptic Journal, with the British and Irish Orthoptic Society
- Journal of the European Second Language Association, with the European Second Language Association
- Journal of African Cultural Heritage Studies
- Undergraduate Journal of Politics and International Relations
- Writing Chinese: A Journal of Contemporary Sinophone Literature
