= University of Leeds =

University in Leeds, England

- Coat of arms
- Latin: Universitas Loidensis
- Motto: Latin: Et augebitur scientia
- Motto in English: And knowledge will be increased
- Type: Public
- Established: 1831 – Leeds School of Medicine; 1874 – Yorkshire College of Science; 1884 – Yorkshire College; 1887 – affiliated to the federal Victoria University; 1904 – University of Leeds
- Affiliations: AACSB; ACU; AMBA; EQUIS; EUA; N8 Group; Russell Group; Universities UK; White Rose Consortium; WUN; AEC (School of Music)
- Endowment: £95.9 million (2025)
- Budget: £990.8 million (2024/25)
- Chancellor: Dame Jane Francis
- Vice-Chancellor: Shearer West
- Academic staff: 4,005 (2024/25)
- Administrative staff: 6,035 (2024/25)
- Students: 34,580 (2024/25); 33,635 FTE (2024/25)
- Undergraduates: 26,155 (2024/25)
- Postgraduates: 8,425 (2024/25)
- Location: Leeds, West Yorkshire, England; 53°48′26″N 1°33′6″W
- Campus: Urban, suburban
- Newspaper: The Gryphon
Colours
- Website: leeds.ac.uk

The University of Leeds is a public research university in Leeds, West Yorkshire, England. It was established in 1874 as the Yorkshire College of Science. In 1884, it merged with the Leeds School of Medicine (established 1831) and was renamed Yorkshire College. It became part of the federal Victoria University in 1887, joining Owens College (which became the University of Manchester) and University College Liverpool (which became the University of Liverpool). In 1904, a royal charter was granted to the University of Leeds by King Edward VII.

Leeds is the tenth-largest university in the United Kingdom by total enrolment and receives over 68,000 undergraduate applications per year, making it the fourth-most popular university (behind Manchester, University College London and King's College London) in the UK by volume of applications. Leeds had an income of £990.8 million in 2024–25, of which £185.6 million was from research grants and contracts, with an expenditure of £999.3 million. The university has financial endowments of £95.9 million (2025), placing it within the top twenty British universities by financial endowment. The university is a member of the Russell Group of British research universities, as well as the regional N8 Research Partnership and White Rose University Consortium.

Notable alumni include former prime minister of the United Kingdom Keir Starmer, current president of Ireland Catherine Connolly, former Home and Foreign Secretary Jack Straw, NASA astronaut Piers Sellers, Hollywood actors Emma Mackey and Chris Pine and two Nobel laureates.

== History ==
=== Prior to formation ===
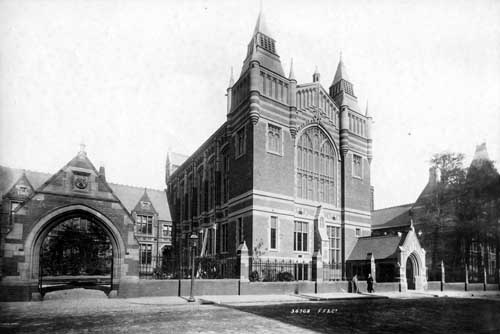
An early view of the Great Hall, next to the Clothworkers' Court

The university's history is linked to the development of Leeds as an international centre for the textile industry and clothing manufacture in the United Kingdom during the Victorian era. The university's roots can be traced back to the formation of schools of medicine in English cities to serve the general public.

The Victoria University was established in Manchester in 1880 as a federal university in the North of England, instead of the government elevating Owens College to a university and grant it a royal charter. Owens College was the sole college of Victoria University from 1880 to 1884; in 1887 Yorkshire College was the third to join the university.

=== Origins of the Leeds School of Medicine and the Yorkshire College ===
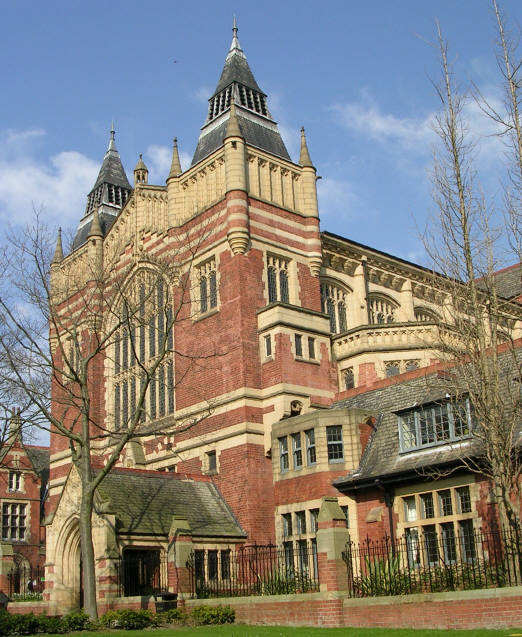
The Great Hall

In 1831, the Leeds School of Medicine was established with the aim of serving the needs of the five medical institutions which had been established in the city. In 1874, the Yorkshire College of Science was created to provide education for the children of middle-class industrialists and merchants. Financial support from local industry was crucial in setting up the college and aiding the students. The university continues to recognise these elements of its history; for example, there is still a Clothworkers' Court on campus.

The College of Science, modelled on Owens College, Manchester, was established in 1851 as non-sectarian, and was open to Protestant Dissenters, Catholics and Jews (though not then to women) since Oxford and Cambridge restricted attendance to members only of the Church of England. University College London was non-sectarian.

The religious qualification ceased in the 1850s but the classics-based education continued at Oxford and Cambridge. The Northern colleges continued to promote themselves as offering a general education that was progressive and pragmatic in nature as were the technical colleges of Germany and the ancient universities upon which they were modelled.

The Yorkshire College of Science began by teaching experimental physics, mathematics, geology, mining, chemistry and biology, and soon became well known as an international centre for the study of engineering and textile technology (due to the manufacturing and textile trades being strong in the West Riding). When classics, modern literature and history went on offer a few years later, the Yorkshire College of Science became simply the Yorkshire College. In 1884, the Yorkshire College absorbed the Leeds School of Medicine and subsequently joined the federal Victoria University (established at Manchester in 1880) on 3 November 1887. Students in this period were awarded external degrees by the University of London.

=== Victoria University and royal charter ===
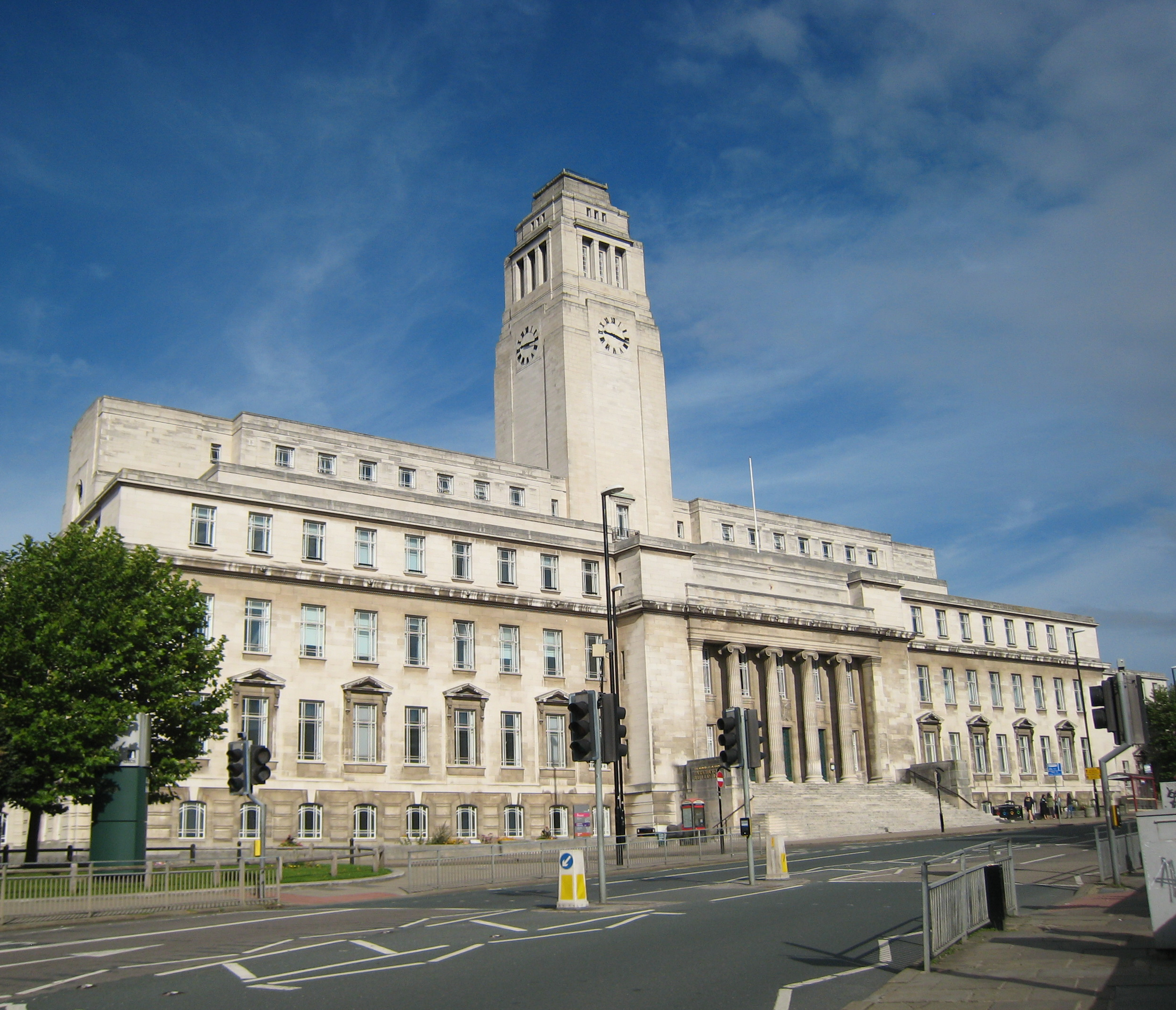
The Parkinson Building, named after Frank Parkinson, a major benefactor to the university

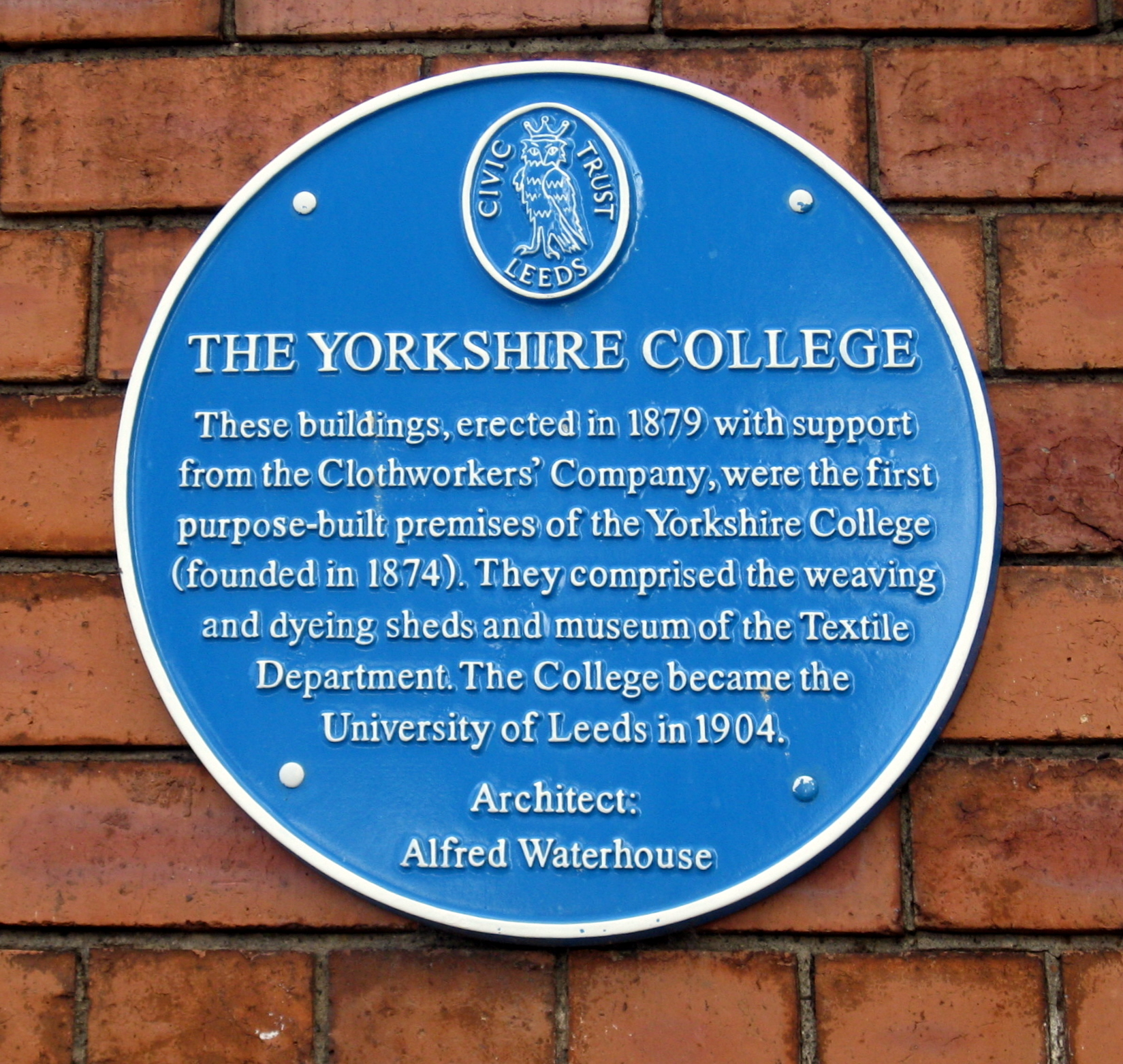
Yorkshire College blue plaque 1879

Leeds was given its first university in 1887 when the Yorkshire College joined the federal Victoria University on 3 November. The Victoria University had been established by royal charter in 1880; Owens College being at first the only member college. Leeds now found itself in an educational union with close social cousins from Manchester and Liverpool.

Unlike Owens College, the Leeds campus of the Victoria University had never barred women from its courses. However, it was not until special facilities were provided at the Day Training College in 1896 that women began enrolling in significant numbers. The first female student to begin a course at the university was Lilias Annie Clark, who studied Modern Literature and Education. In 1904 Leeds University wanted to encourage more women students. It decided to pay the unprecedented salary of £400 per annum to Hannah Robertson who took on a double role of "Mistress of Method" in the Education department and as the Tutor of Women.

The Victoria University was a short-lived concept, as the constituent colleges in Manchester, Liverpool and Leeds were keen to establish themselves as separate, independent universities. This was partially due to the potential benefits independent universities had for the cities, whilst the institutions were also unhappy with the practical difficulties posed by maintaining a federal arrangement across broad distances. This was further spurred by the granting of a charter to the University of Birmingham in 1900 after lobbying from Joseph Chamberlain.

Following a royal charter and the act of Parliament, Liverpool University Act 1903, the University of Liverpool gained independence and began the fragmentation of the Victoria University. The Yorkshire College soon followed suit and was granted a royal charter as the University of Leeds by King Edward VII in 1904.

=== 2000 to present ===
The Victoria University continued after the break-up of the group, with an amended constitution and renamed as the Victoria University of Manchester (though "Victoria" was usually omitted from its name except in formal usage) until September 2004. On 1 October 2004 a merger with the University of Manchester Institute of Science and Technology was enacted to form The University of Manchester.

In December 2004, financial pressures forced the university's governing body (the Council) to decide to close the Bretton campus. Activities at Bretton were moved to the main university campus in the summer of 2007 (allowing all Bretton-based students to complete their studies there). There was substantial opposition to the closure by the Bretton students. The university's other satellite site, Manygates in Wakefield, also closed, but Lifelong Learning and Healthcare programmes are continuing on a new site next to Wakefield College.

In May 2006, the university began re-branding itself to consolidate its visual identity to promote one consistent image. A new logo was produced, based on that used during the centenary celebrations in 2004, to replace the combined use of the modified university arms and the Parkinson Building, which has been in use since 2004. The university arms will still be used in its original form for ceremonial purposes only. Four university colours were also specified as being green, red, black and beige.

Leeds provides the local community with over 2,000 university student volunteers. With 8,700 staff employed in 2019–20, the university is the third largest employer in Leeds and contributes around £1.23bn a year to the local economy – students add a further £211m through rents and living costs.

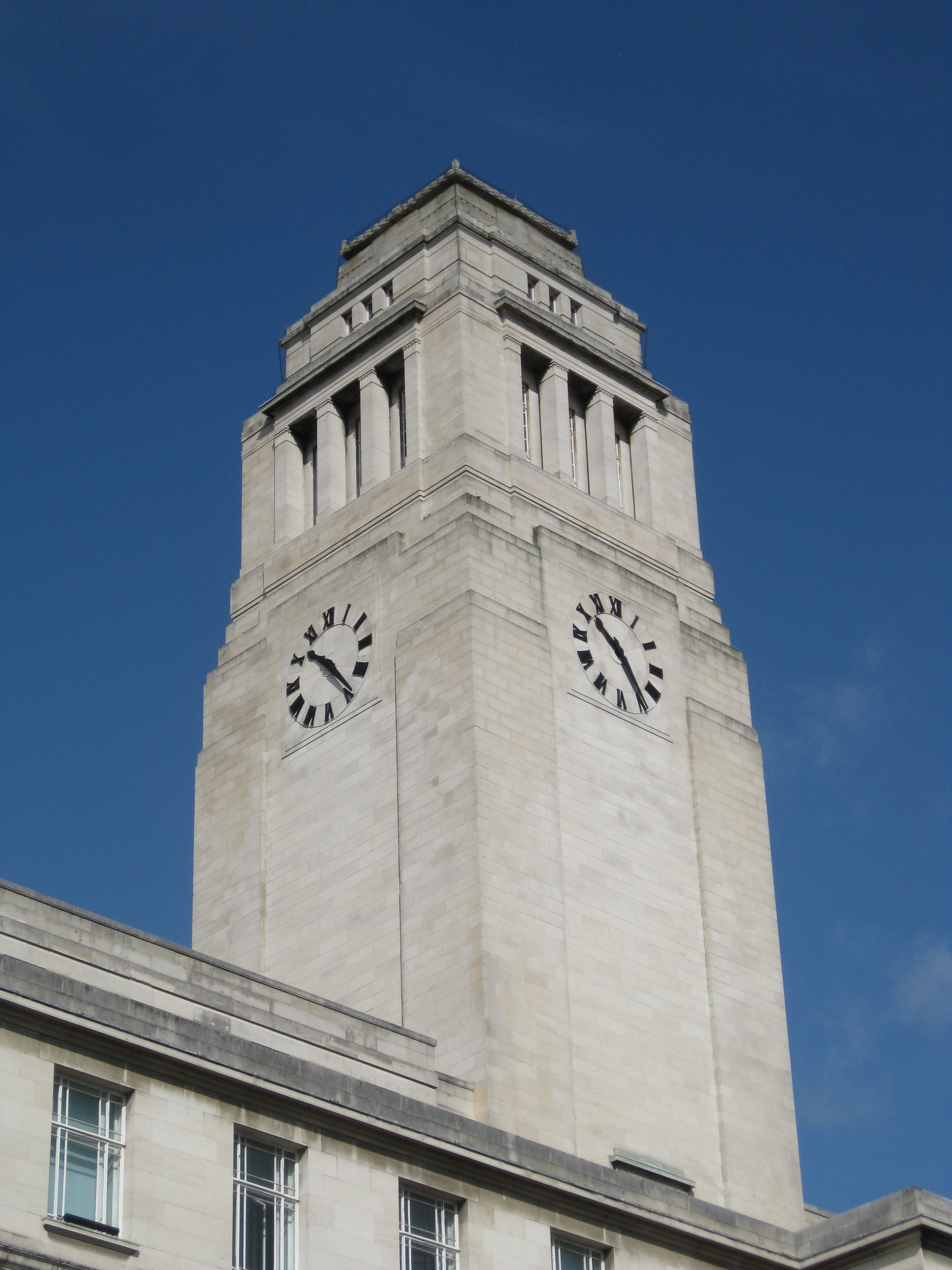
The Parkinson Building campanile, which features prominently in the university logo and publications after re-branding in 2006

The university's educational partnerships have included providing formal accreditation of degree awards to Leeds College of Art and Leeds Trinity University College, although the latter now has the power to award its own degrees. The College of the Resurrection, an Anglican theological college in Mirfield with monastic roots, has, since its inception in 1904, been affiliated to the university, and ties remain close. The university is also a founding member of the Northern Consortium.

In August 2010, the university was one of the most targeted institutions by students entering the UCAS clearing process for 2010 admission, which matches undersubscribed courses to students who did not meet their firm or insurance choices. The university was one of nine Russell Group universities offering extremely limited places to "exceptional" students after the universities in Birmingham, Bristol, Cambridge, Edinburgh and Oxford declared they would not enter the process due to courses being full to capacity.

On 12 October 2010, The Refectory of the Leeds University Union hosted a live edition of the Channel 4 News, with students, academics and economists expressing their reaction to the Browne Review, an independent review of Higher Education funding and student finance conducted by John Browne, Baron Browne of Madingley. University of Leeds Vice-Chancellor and Russell Group chairman Michael Arthur participated, giving an academic perspective alongside current vice-chancellor of Kingston University and former Pro Vice-Chancellor and Professor of Education at the University of Leeds, Sir Peter Scott. Midway through the broadcast a small group of protesters against the potential rise of student debt entered the building before being restrained and evacuated.

In 2016, The University of Leeds became University of the Year 2017 in The Times and The Sunday Times Good University Guide. The university has risen to 13th place overall, which reflects impressive results in student experience, high entry standards, services and facilities, and graduate prospects.

In 2022, the global world ranking of the University of Leeds is 86. There are currently 36,840 students studying at the university. The average tuition fee is £9,250 (~$12,000–12,500) per year, although there are cases where there are partial subsidies towards this cost.

== Campus ==
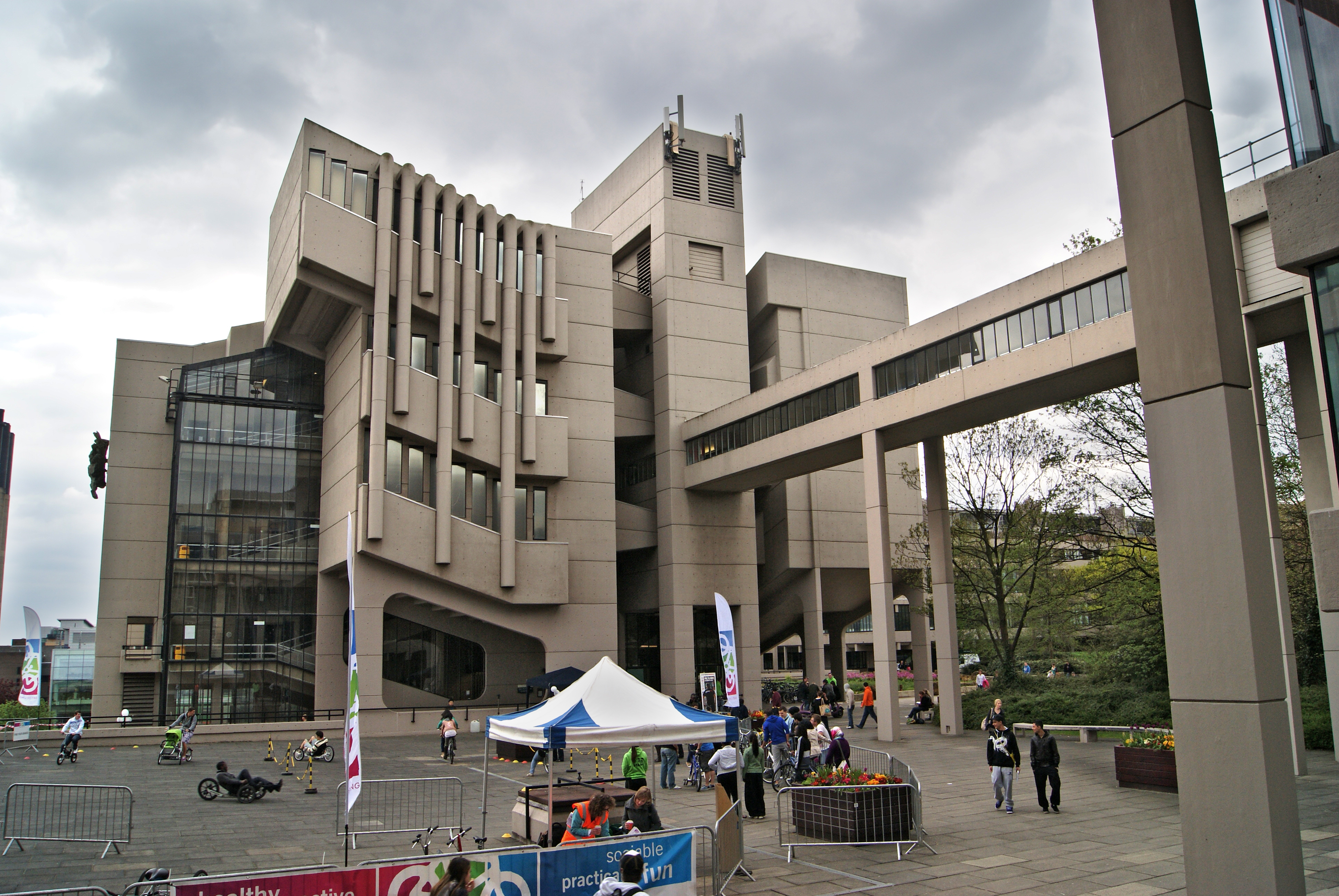
The Roger Stevens Building

The university has 1,230 acres (498 ha) of land in total, with the main campus taking up 98 acres (40 ha). The main campus is located 1 mile (1.6 km) north of Leeds city centre and consists of a mixture of Gothic revival, art deco, brutalist and postmodern buildings, making it one of the most diverse university campuses in the country in terms of building styles and history. It is within walking distance of both the city centre and popular student neighbourhoods Hyde Park, Woodhouse, and Headingley. The main entrance to the campus for visitors by car is on Woodhouse Lane (A660), near the Parkinson Building. The former Woodhouse Cemetery is within the campus, now a landscaped area known as St George's Fields.

=== Parkinson Building ===
The Parkinson Building is a grade II listed art deco building and campanile named after the late Frank Parkinson, a major benefactor of the university who oversaw many new build projects from 1936 onwards. These commitments culminating in the official opening of The Parkinson Building (to which Parkinson donated £200,000) on 9 November 1951. The tower of the building is a well-known landmark in the city of Leeds and is used in the university logo and as a university symbol. The campanile is the highest point of the building and stands at 57 metres (187 ft) tall, making it the 17th tallest building in the city of Leeds.

=== Maurice Keyworth Building ===
The Leeds University Business School is housed in the renovated 19th-century buildings (known as the Maurice Keyworth Building), which used to belong to Leeds Grammar School on the Western side of the University of Leeds campus. The university have also constructed further modern buildings on the business school area of campus known as the Innovation Hub; costing £9.3 million. The building is a three-storey building of 4350 m^{2} (gross capacity), with the third floor accommodating the Innovation Hub.

=== Roger Stevens Building ===
Built in 1970, the Roger Stevens building houses 25 lecture theatres and is considered one of the most iconic structures on campus. It is named after diplomat, civil servant and former vice-chancellor Roger Stevens. In the Leeds Architecture Awards 2025 it received The People's Choice Award from a shortlist of 10 put to a public vote. Other nominated buildings on the shortlist were Bridgewater Place and Victoria Gate.

=== Great Hall ===
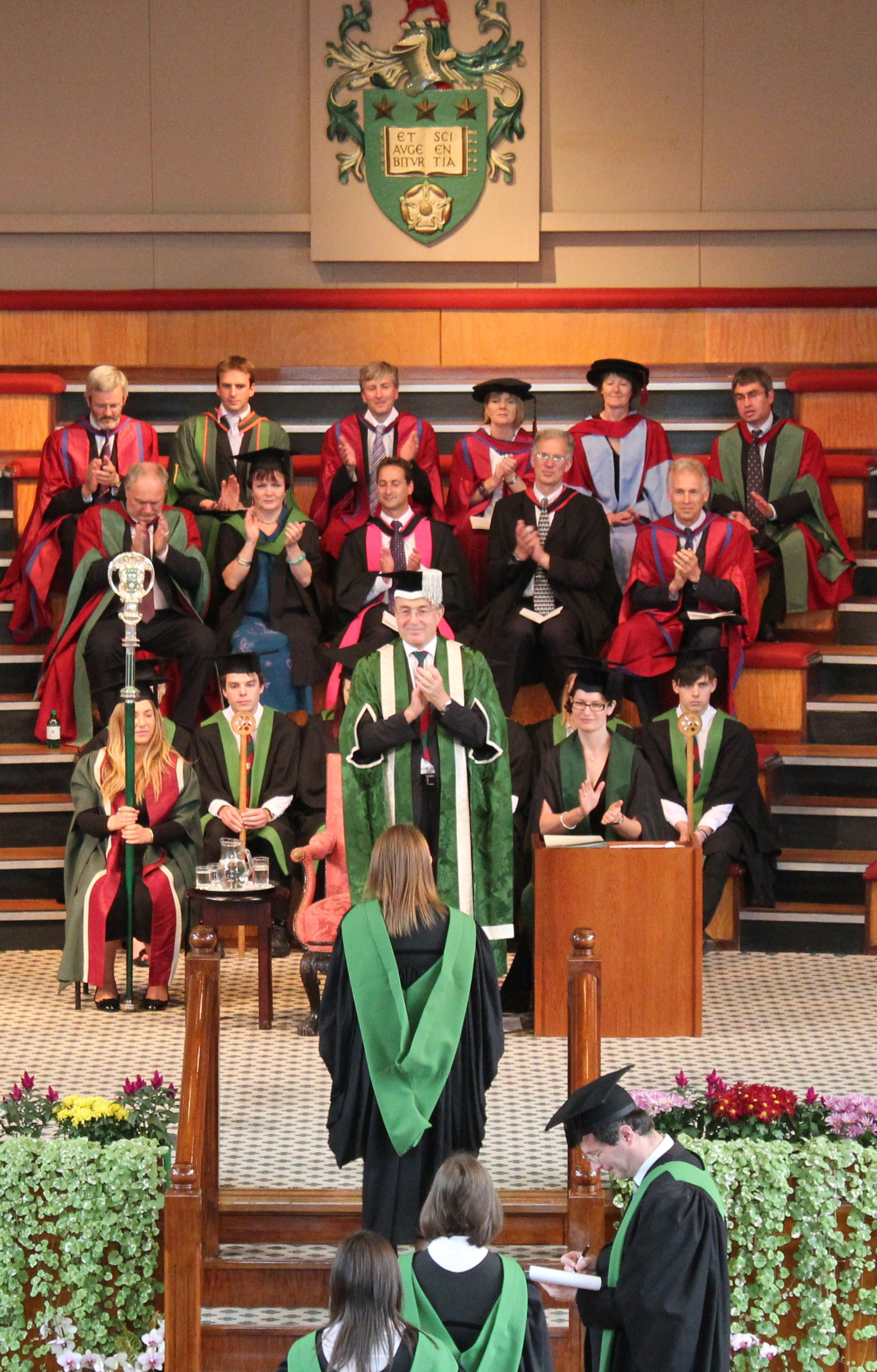
The Great Hall is the venue for graduation ceremonies.

The university's Great Hall is one of the most prominent buildings on campus alongside the Parkinson Building and the numerous brutalist buildings which are Grade II listed. The Great Hall was built on the site of the Beech Grove Hall Estate which was purchased in 1879 by the Yorkshire College when joining the Victoria University. This was demolished in 1884 and became the site of the Clothworkers buildings, the Baines Memorial Wing and the Great Hall. The buildings were designed by the renowned Victorian architect Alfred Waterhouse RA in red brick with dressings of Bolton Wood stone in a Gothic Collegiate style. The cost of the build was £22,000, raised partially by public appeal. The building housed the university library until the opening of the Brotherton Library in 1936.

The Great Hall is now primarily used for examinations, meetings and graduation ceremonies.

=== Post-war buildings ===
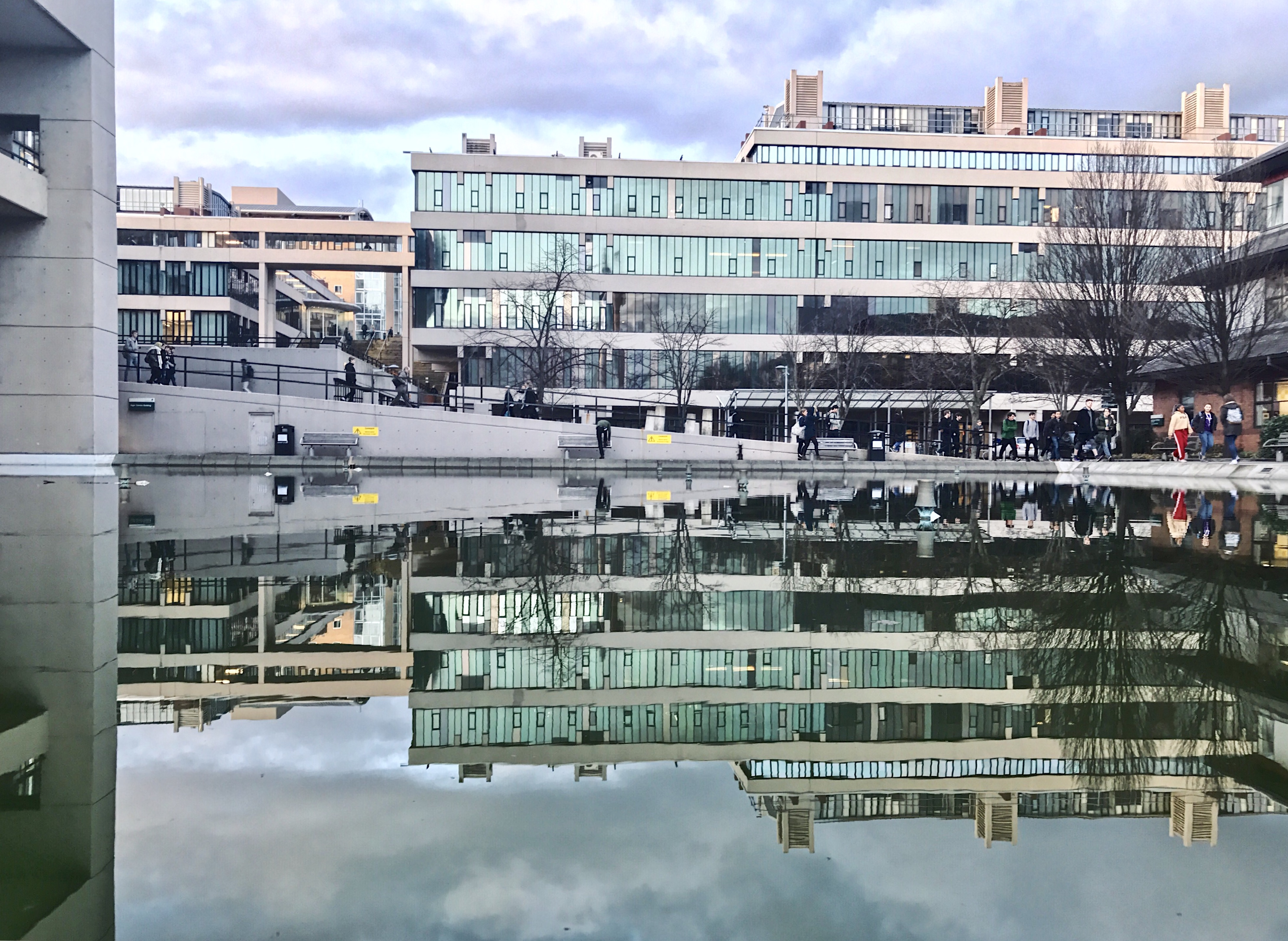
EC Stoner Building

In June 2010, post-war buildings at the University of Leeds were recommended by English Heritage to become Grade II listed buildings. The modernist and brutalist buildings being recognised include the newly Grade II* listed Roger Stevens Building, whilst the EC Stoner Building, Computer Science Building, Mathematics/Earth Sciences Building, Senior Common Room, Garstang Building, Irene Manton Building, Communications and Edward Boyle Library (formerly the South Library) and Henry Price Building have been recognised as Grade II listed buildings. These additions join the already listed 1877 Great Hall and Baines Wing, the School of Mineral Engineering, the Brotherton Library and the Parkinson Building which are Grade II listed.

In addition to the main campus, there was also a satellite location at Wakefield. Until the 2006–07 academic year, some courses were taught at the Bretton Hall campus in West Bretton. The site closed in summer 2007 after which the courses taught there were relocated to the main campus in Leeds.

Leeds railway station is approximately 1 mile south of the main campus. There are numerous bus routes which serve it. The proposed Leeds Supertram would have run past the campus. The currently proposed Leeds Trolleybus (northern line) will run past the campus, linking it with the city centre, Headingley and Lawnswood. The Leeds Inner Ring Road also lies close to the campus.

The University of Leeds Conference Auditorium, located next to the Sports Hall, was once the original West Yorkshire Playhouse. It was refurbished in 2003 to become two lecture theatres; one for 320 and one for 550, making it the largest capacity facility on the university campus.

The university's Muslim Prayer Room is located in the Conference Auditorium building and able to accommodate up to 300 people at any one time. The prayer room has undergone refurbishment after half a million pounds was allocated towards its development.

=== Modern expansion ===
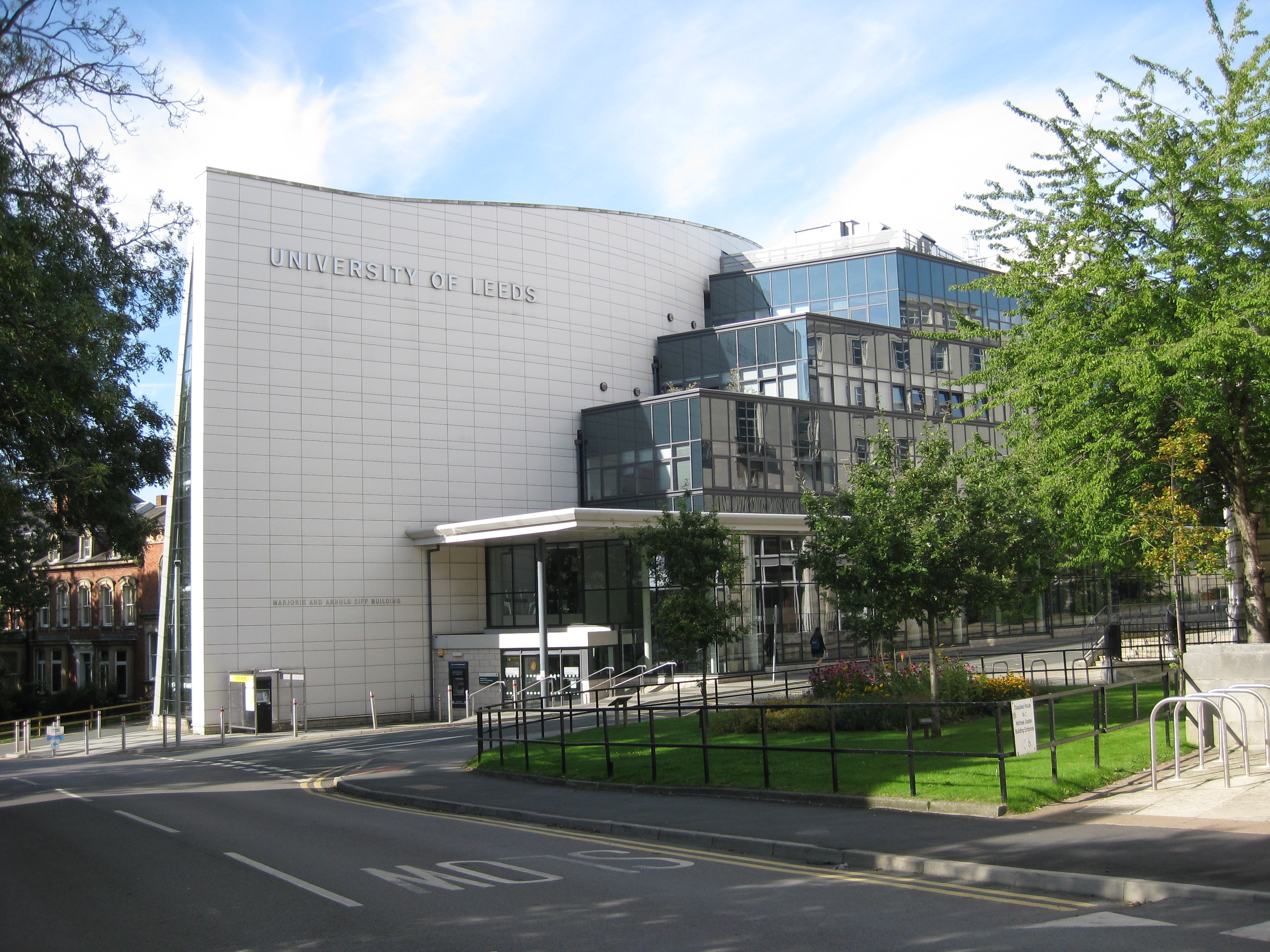
The Ziff Building, which houses student services as of 2008

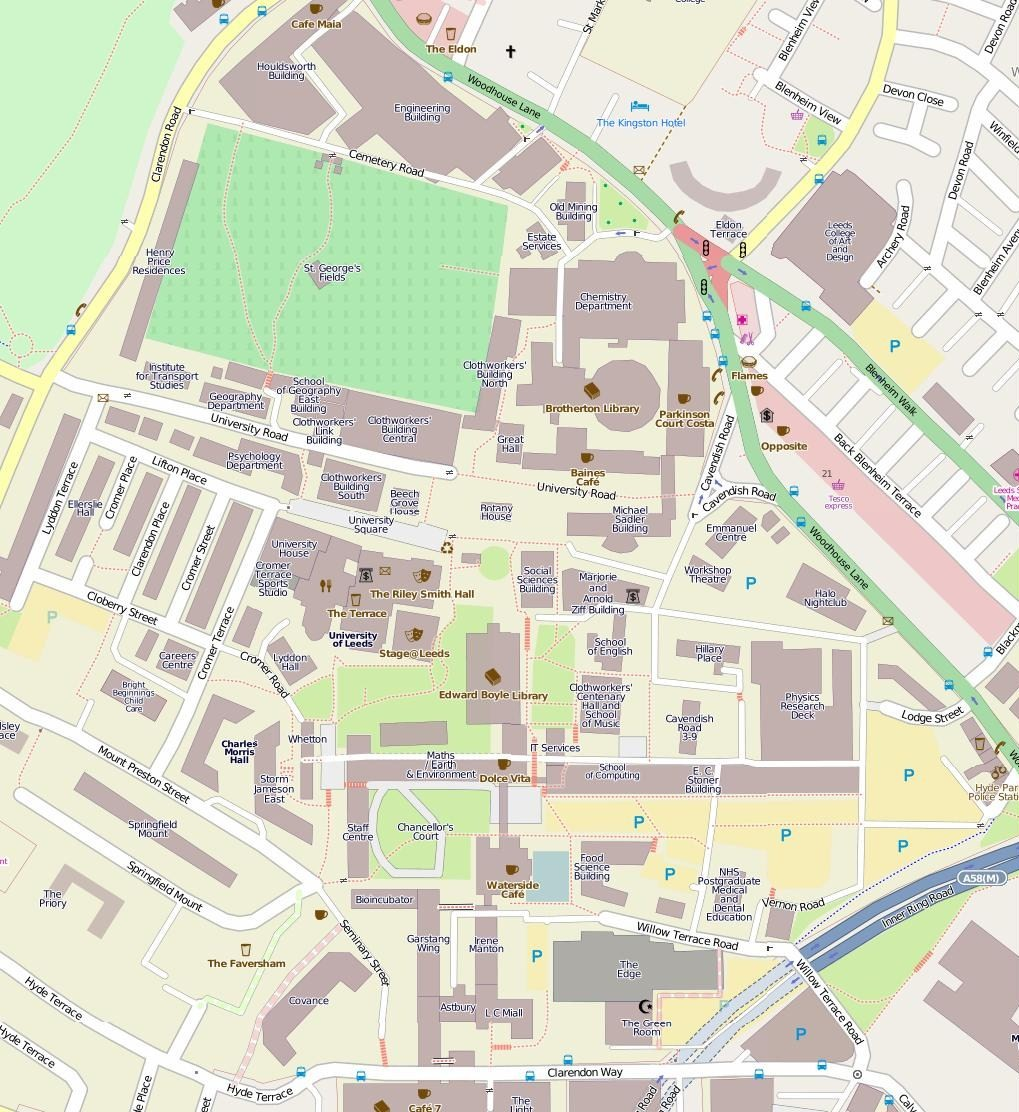
Street map of the main campus

The university has engaged in expansion since 2008, and has spent more than £300 million on new educational, research, residential and leisure facilities with a further £80 million being spent to improve current assets. The programme of this expansion constitutes one of the largest capital investment projects in British higher education.

- Earth and Environment improvements included a phased refurbishment and construction of this £23 million development which is already completed. These renovations included refurbished laboratory space in the west wing which opened for staff and students in April 2009, and the completion of the remaining elements of the scheme, both new build and refurbished, followed in November 2009.
- Charles Morris Hall student accommodation renovations started with the demolition of the previous Mary Ogilvie House, the existing 108 bed student accommodation block, and construction of a new 500-bed, £27.1 million building began in March 2009, the new halls were completed in the summer of 2010, with the first students moving in for the new academic year in September 2010.
- The Childcare Centre building work has also been completed and led to the creation of a new 140 place staff/student childcare centre and a new landscaped green square on adjoining plot. Work on the £3.6 million project lasted approximately 12 months with the official opening in April 2010.
- Swimming pool and fitness centre improvements (known as The Edge) started in 2009 and consisted of the construction of the new £12.2 million swimming pool/gym complex on the south-western edge of campus. The facility was due for completion by the end of February 2010 however was delayed until being officially opened in May 2010.
- The Law Building is a £12 million project which was completed in early 2011. Work on the project started September 2009 and completion was initially planned for late 2010. The new building is located on the western side of the university campus alongside the Leeds University Business School and is adjacent to the new Michael Marks Building which features the Marks & Spencer archives, including over 60,000 artefacts from London and Leeds (where the company was founded). This new collection of buildings forms the 'Professional' campus of the university, housing business, economics and law functions.
- The Edward Boyle Library £28 million redevelopment of the library was approved by the university and a consultant design team appointed, with a view to work commencing late 2010. However, budget cuts resulted in the project being put on hold until 2015. The refurbishment began in summer 2015 and was completed in late 2016.
- The Energy Building, is a £12.5 million development extending the engineering complex. Build work began in late summer 2010, and was completed in March 2012.
- Clothworkers Building North has undergone a £42.3 million development completely refurbishing the facilities. Building work began during the Coronavirus Pandemic.

=== Public art ===
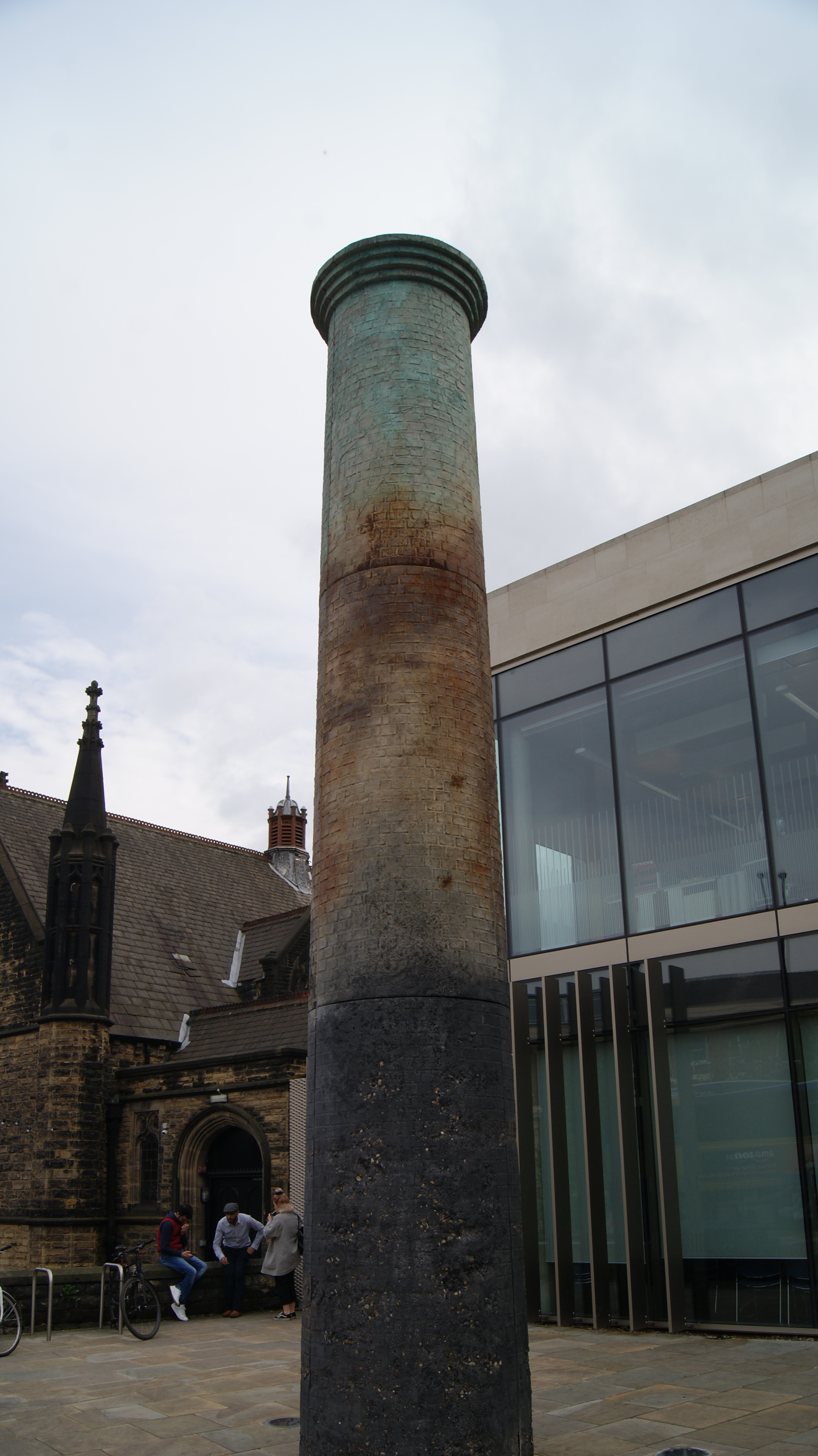
Simon Fujiwara's 2015 cast jesmonite A Spire, outside the Laidlaw Library

Works of public art on campus range from Eric Gill's controversial 1923 World War I memorial Christ driving the Moneychangers from the Temple in the foyer of the Rupert Beckett Building to Simon Fujiwara's 2015 9 metres (30 ft) A Spire outside the Laidlaw Library and Liliane Lijn's 2019 Converse Column at the south east entrance to the campus. The university has a Public Art Strategy developed with the Contemporary Art Society.

=== Off campus ===
Gair Wood is located about 5 miles (8.0 km) north of the main campus, close to Eccup. It is a 36 hectare site with over 60,000 "regionally appropriate" trees, including oak, hazel, and willow, providing a base for research, teaching, social opportunities and carbon capture. The first tree was planted by Roger Gair, a former University Secretary, in 2022.

== Academic profile ==
During the 2024/25 academic year, 36,330 students were enrolled. There were around 560 different first-degree programmes and approximately 300 postgraduate degree programmes in 2009–10. Whilst maintaining its strengths in the traditional subjects (for example more students studying languages and physical sciences than anywhere else in the UK), Leeds has also developed expertise in more distinctive and rare specialist areas such as Colour Chemistry, Fire Science, Nanotechnology and Aviation Technology with Pilot studies.

=== Libraries ===
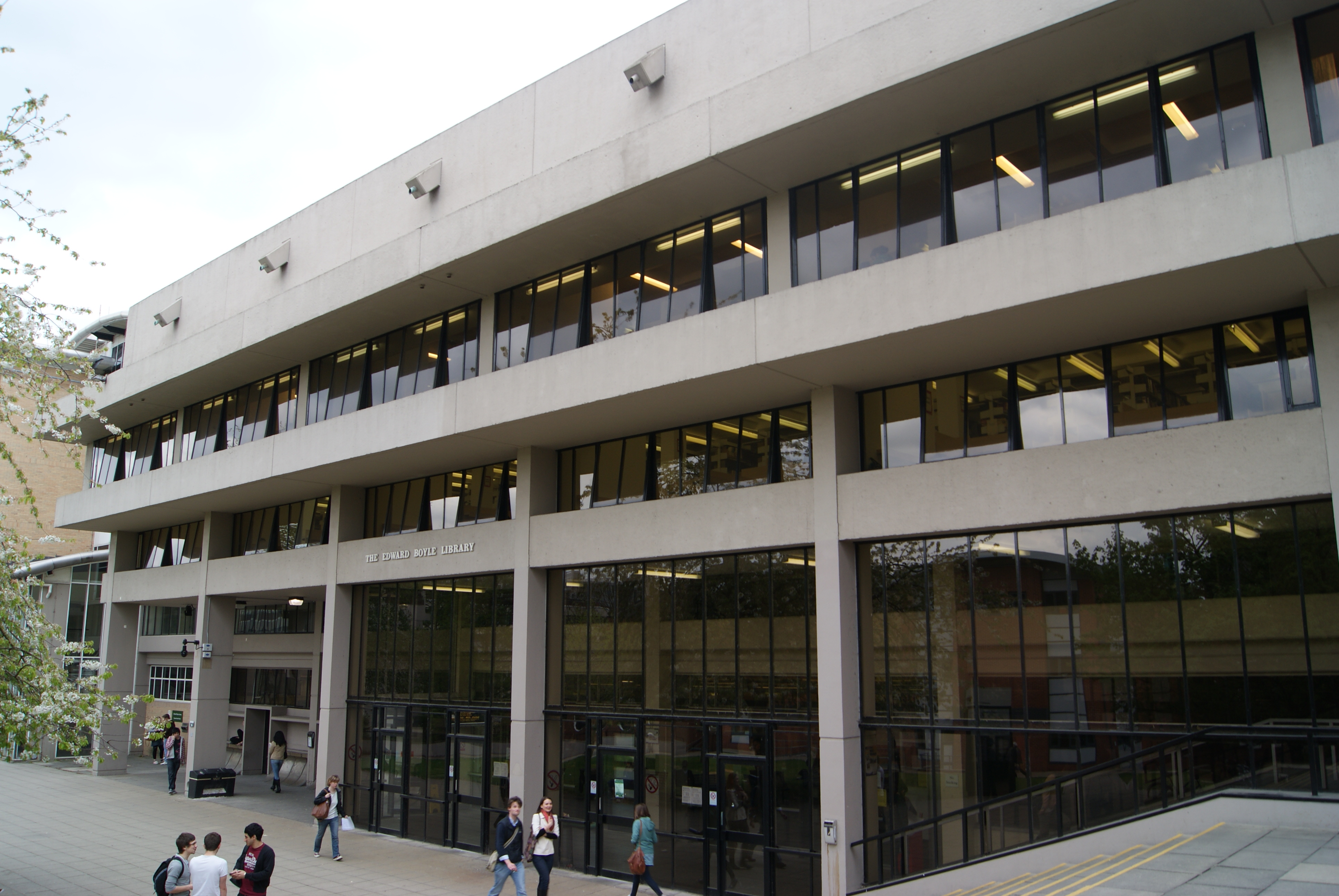
The Edward Boyle Library, one of numerous Brutalist buildings linked by a series of interconnected skyways

The university library is spread over five locations, and holds, in total, 2.78 million books, 26,000 print and electronic journals, 850 databases and 6,000 electronic books: making it one of the largest research libraries in the UK. The main arts and humanities library is the Brotherton Library, located in the Parkinson Building. The main science, social sciences and engineering library is the Edward Boyle Library, located in the centre of the campus and named after Edward Boyle, Baron Boyle of Handsworth who was vice-chancellor from 1970 to 1981. Medicine, dentistry and healthcare students are served by the Health Sciences Library, located in the Worsley Building, and there is an extension of this library at St James's University Hospital. The Laidlaw Library on the main campus, serving the needs of undergraduates, opened in May 2015. It is named after Lord Laidlaw who gave £9,000,000 towards its construction.

The university library houses numerous archives, rare books and some objects in its Special Collections ranging from 2,500 BC to the 21st century. Special Collections holds five collections designated as outstanding by the Arts Council England. These are the English Literature Collections, the Leeds Russian Archive, the Liddle Collection, the Cookery Collection and its Gypsy, Traveller and Roma Collections. The repository contains William Shakespeare's First Folio Mr. William Shakespeare's Comedies, Histories. & Tragedies published in 1623. Special Collections also holds copies of the second, third and fourth folios. There is a copy of Sir Isaac Newton's Philosophiæ Naturalis Principia Mathematica, first published 5 July 1687.

Special Collections holds over 300 incunabula most of which are in the Brotherton Collection. It also contains a considerable number of medieval manuscripts. The extensive coin collection consists of 15,000 coins and medals with a wide chronological and geographical spread. The Feminist Archive North Collections are on deposit. These contain a material relating to women from 1969 to the present day.

The Stanley and Audrey Burton Gallery, the Treasures of the Brotherton Gallery and the International Textile Collection are managed by Special Collections.

=== Computing ===
IT Services support the University with a range of services targeted for use by different University communities. University Faculties, Schools and Institutes also provide computing facilities. Collectively these provide computational capability that can be used by staff, students and visitors. Additional computational capability is provided via external Cloud Computing and High Performance Computing facilities.

In 2023, a total of 31 centrally managed IT study spaces were available for use.

=== Research ===
Many of the academic departments have specialist research facilities, for use by staff and students to support research from internationally significant collections in university libraries to state-of-the-art laboratories. These include those hosted at the Institute for Transport Studies, such as the University of Leeds Driving Simulator which is one of the most advanced worldwide in a research environment, allowing transport researchers to watch driver behaviour in accurately controlled laboratory conditions without the risks associated with a live, physical environment.

With extensive links to the St James's University Hospital through the Leeds School of Medicine, the university operates a range of high-tech research laboratories for biomedical and physical sciences, food and engineering – including clean rooms for bionanotechnology and plant science greenhouses. The university is connected to Leeds General Infirmary and the institute of molecular medicine based at St James's University Hospital which aids integration of research and practice in the medical field.

The university also operate research facilities in the aviation field, with the Airbus A320 flight simulator. The simulator was devised with an aim to promote the safety and efficiency of flight operations; where students use the simulator to develop their reactions to critical situations such as engine failure, display malfunctioning and freak weather.

In addition to these facilities, many university departments conduct research in their respective fields. There are also various research centres, including Leeds University Centre for African Studies.

=== Medicine ===
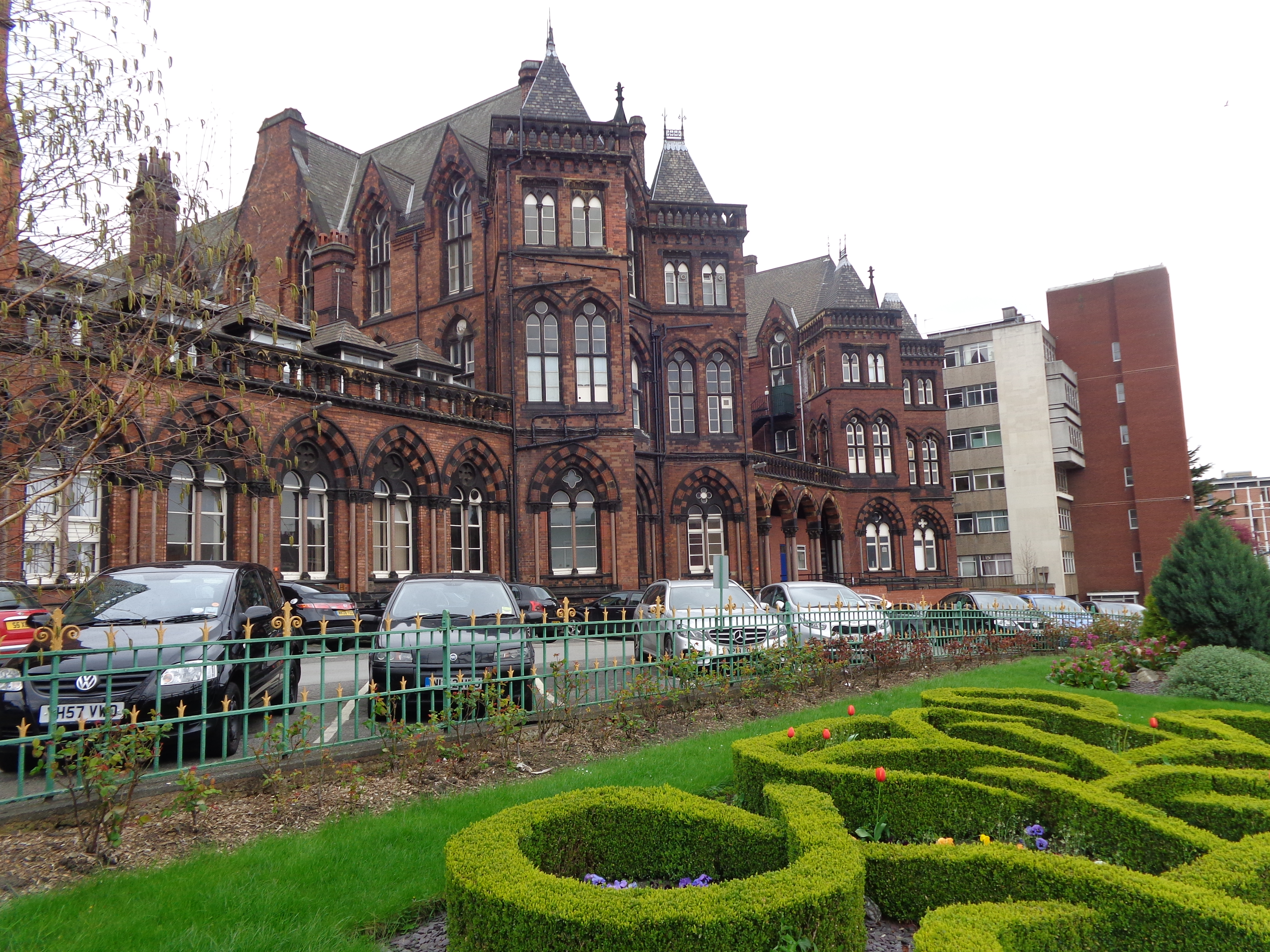
The Leeds General Infirmary (pictured) and St James's University Hospital incorporate the Leeds School of Medicine.

The Leeds School of Medicine is one of the largest medical schools in Europe, with over 250 medical students being trained in each of the clinical years and over 1,000 teaching, research, technical and administrative staff. The school has centres of excellence split down into Leeds Institute of Genetics, Health and Therapeutics (LIGHT), Leeds Institute of Health Sciences (LIHS), Leeds Institute of Medical Education (LIME) and The Leeds Institute of Molecular Medicine (LIMM). In 2010–11 university guides, the Leeds School of Medicine was ranked as the 11th best medical school in the country by The Guardian and 14th by The Complete University Guide in association with The Independent.

The medical school has close links with the NHS and works closely with Leeds Teaching Hospitals NHS Trust, comprising six hospitals and numerous primary care training practices in Yorkshire and the Humber.

The Leeds General Infirmary and St James's University Hospital, Leeds are the main teaching hospitals in the West Yorkshire region with St James's University Hospital being one of the largest teaching hospitals in Europe. The main university campus is adjacent to the Leeds General Infirmary and is directly connected via the Worsley Building of the Leeds Medical School.

Leeds General Infirmary is a centre in the UK for neurosurgery, and one of only 10 centres in the UK for Paediatric cardiology. The hospital features a rooftop landing pad for the Yorkshire Air Ambulance Service.

=== Rankings and reputation ===
Rankings
National rankings
- Complete (2027): 18
- Guardian (2027): 26
- Times / Sunday Times (2027): 22

Global rankings
- ARWU (2026): 151–200
- QS (2027): 77=
- THE (2026): 118

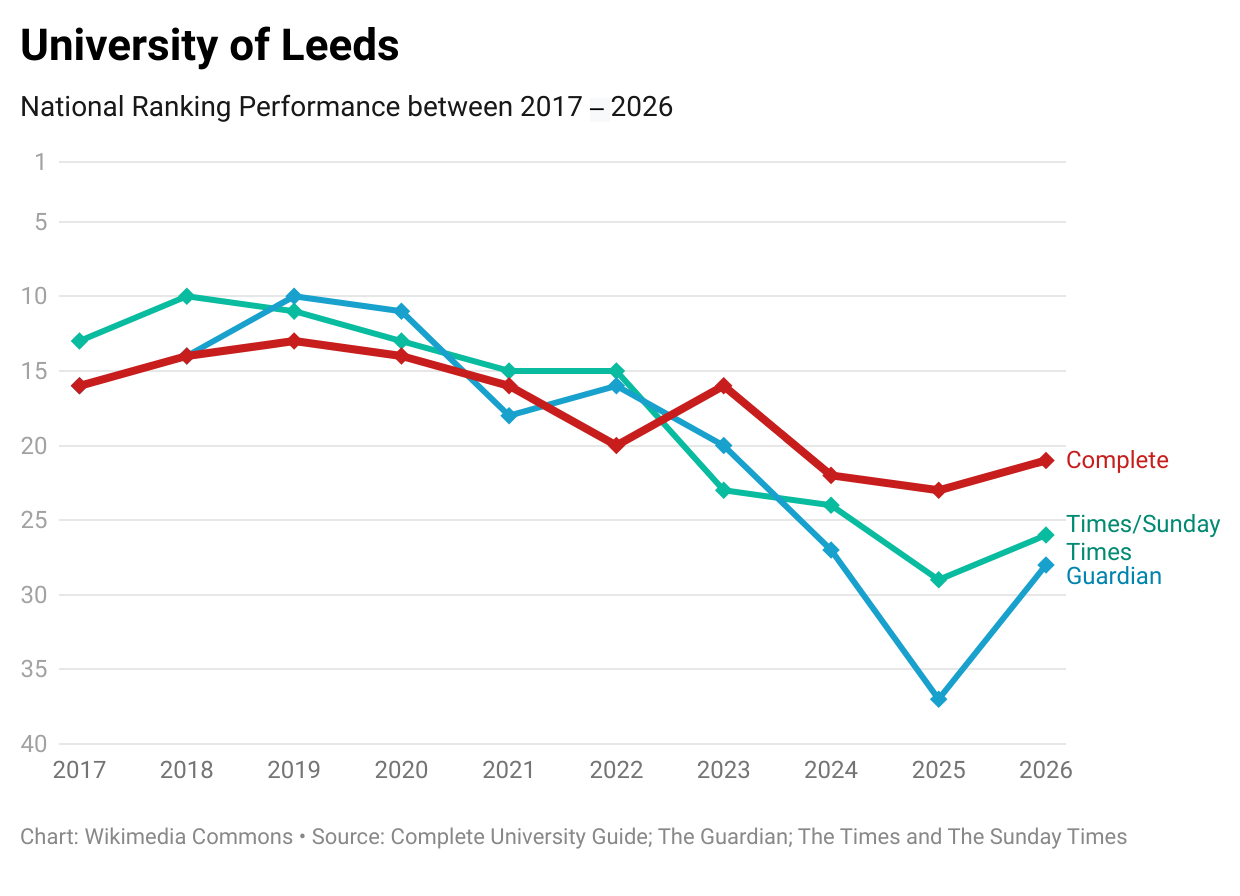
University of Leeds' national league table performance over the past ten years

In the 2021 Research Excellence Framework, Leeds was ranked joint 20th (along with the University of Exeter) amongst multi-faculty institutions in the UK for the quality (GPA) of its research and 8th for its Research Power (the grade point average score of a university, multiplied by the full-time equivalent number of researchers submitted).

Between 2014 and 2015, Leeds was ranked as the 10th most targeted British university by graduate employers, a two place decrease from 8th position in the previous 2014 rankings.

In 2026, Leeds was ranked 11th in the UK and 56th in the world universities ranking by Time magazine and Statista. The 2021 Times Higher Education World University Rankings ranked Leeds as 153rd in the world and the 2020 CWTS Leiden Ranking ranked Leeds 84th. Leeds is ranked 86th in the world (and 13th in the UK) in the 2023 QS World University Rankings. Leeds has also been named University of the Year 2017 by The Times and The Sunday Times' Good University Guide. In 2019, it ranked 150th among the universities around the world by SCImago Institutions Rankings.

In 2009, the university was awarded the Queen's Anniversary Prize for services to engineering and technology.

=== Affiliations ===
The university is a founding member of the Russell Group of research-intensive universities in the UK, as well as the N8 Research Partnership for research collaboration, the Worldwide Universities Network, the Association of Commonwealth Universities, the European University Association, the White Rose University Consortium, the Santander Network and the CDIO Initiative. It is also affiliated to Universities UK. The Leeds University Business School holds the 'Triple Crown' of accreditations from the Association to Advance Collegiate Schools of Business, the Association of MBAs and the European Quality Improvement System.

=== Admissions ===
UCAS Admission Statistics
	2025	2024	2023	2022	2021
Applications (Note: Main scheme applications, International and UK)	67,290	68,055	69,085	67,565	66,200
Accepted	9,750	8,480	7,800	7,345	8,885
Applications/Accepted Ratio	6.9	8.0	8.9	9.2	7.5
Overall Offer Rate (%)	66.5	60.0	56.8	49.9	64.9
↳ UK only (%) (Note: UK domiciled applicants)	66.1	59.2	56.5	47.0	64.2
Average Entry Tariff	—N/a	—N/a	149	162	162
↳ Top three exams (Note: The maximum tariff score for three exams is 168: the equivalent of A*A*A* at A-Level, 777 at HL for the IB Diploma Programme, or AAA at Advanced Higher)	—N/a	—N/a	146.5	150.1	152.4

HESA Student Body Composition (2024/25)
Domicile and Ethnicity	Total
British White (Note: Not be confused solely with White British)	50%
British Ethnic Minorities (Note: Includes those who indicate that they identify as Asian, Black, Mixed Heritage, Arab or any other ethnicity except White.)	29%
International EU	1%
International Non-EU	30%
Undergraduate Widening Participation Indicators
Female	60%
Independent School	18%
Low Participation Areas (Note: Calculated from the Polar4 measure, using Quintile1, in England and Wales. Calculated from the Scottish Index of Multiple Deprivation (SIMD) measure, using SIMD20, in Scotland.)	9%

The university is consistently designated as a 'high-tariff' institution by the Department for Education, with the average undergraduate entrant to the university in recent years amassing between 146 and 152 UCAS Tariff points in their top three pre-university qualifications – the equivalent of AAA to A*AA at A-Level. Based on 2022/23 HESA entry standards data published in domestic league tables, which include a broad range of qualifications beyond the top three exam grades, the average student at the University of Leeds achieved 162 points – the 22nd highest in the country. The university gave offers of admission to 47.3% of its undergraduate applicants in 2022, the 11th lowest offer rate across the country. For 2016 entry, Leeds received over 50,000 applications for undergraduate courses, making it the 4th most popular university by volume of applications.

In the 2024/25 academic year, the student body consisted of 34,580 students, composed of 26,155 undergraduates and 8,425 postgraduate students. The University of Leeds welcomes more than 9,000 international students from over 170 countries each year, making its campus one of the most diverse and multicultural in the UK.

19.6% of Leeds' undergraduates are privately educated, the eighteenth highest proportion amongst mainstream British universities. In the 2016–17 academic year, the university had a domicile breakdown of 77:4:18 of UK:EU:non-EU students respectively with a female to male ratio of 61:39. Figures for graduates in the 2016–17 year showed that 30% of undergraduates gained a first-class honours degree, 57% gained a 2:1, 12% gained a 2:2 and 1% gained a 3rd.

== Organisation and governance ==
=== Faculties ===
The various schools, institutes and centres of the university are arranged into seven faculties, each with a dean, pro-deans and central functions:

- Arts, Humanities and Cultures (English; History; Philosophy, Religion and History of Science; Institute for Colonial and Postcolonial Studies; Leeds Humanities Research Institute; Institute for Medieval Studies; Languages, Cultures and Societies; School of Media and Communication; Design; Fine Art, History of Art & Cultural Studies; Music; Performance and Cultural Industries)
- Biological Sciences (School of Biology; School of Biomedical Sciences; School of Molecular and Cellular Biology)
- Business (Accounting and Finance; Analytics, Technology and Operations; Economics; International Business; Management and Organisations; Marketing; People, Work and Employment)
- Social Sciences (Education; Law; Politics and International Studies; Sociology and Social Policy; Graduate School)
- Engineering and Physical Sciences (Chemical and Process Engineering; Civil Engineering; Chemistry; Computer Science; Electronic and Electrical Engineering; Mechanical Engineering; Mathematics; Physics and Astronomy)
- Environment (Earth and Environment; Geography; Institute for Transport Studies, School of Food Science and Nutrition)
- Medicine and Health (Leeds Dental Institute; Healthcare; Medicine; Leeds Institute of Genetics, Health and Therapeutics; Leeds Institute of Health Sciences; Leeds Institute of Medical Education; Leeds Institute of Molecular Medicine; Institute of Psychological Sciences)

=== Governance ===
The Court serves as a mechanism for the university's accountability to the wider community and to stakeholders, making sure that the university is well managed, properly governed and responsive to public and local interests and concerns. It is made up of mainly lay members.

The Council is the governing body of the university, consisting of mainly lay members along with representatives of staff and students. It is responsible for the proper management and financial solvency of the university, with major policy decisions and corporate strategy being subject to its approval.

The Senate is the principal academic authority of the university. It oversees academic management and sets strategy and priorities, including the curriculum and maintenance of standards.

=== International partners ===
The university holds a number of formal links with institutions from around the world to share teaching and research and facilitate staff and student exchanges. Numerous European universities participate in the Erasmus Programme which permits learning across the many institutions in this region. Students at Leeds may choose from twinned European universities, with each faculty having particular university affiliations.

=== Chancellor ===
The Chancellor acts as a ceremonial figurehead and sits on the University Court. Leeds has had seven chancellors since gaining its royal charter in 1904.

Chancellors
Name	Duration
George Robinson, 1st Marquess of Ripon	1904–1909
Victor Cavendish, 9th Duke of Devonshire	1909–1938
Edward Cavendish, 10th Duke of Devonshire	1938–1950
Mary, Princess Royal and Countess of Harewood	1951–1965
Katharine, Duchess of Kent	1966–1999
Melvyn Bragg, the Lord Bragg	1999–2017
Dame Jane Francis	2017–

Pro-Chancellor

The Pro-Chancellor deputises for the Chancellor. The first, named in the 1904 charter, was businessman and chairman of the Council of the Yorkshire College, Arthur Greenhow Lupton, of a prosperous and prominent family long connected with Leeds and its university. His mother, Frances Lupton, was a pioneering educationalist and more than one of his relatives were Lord Mayor of Leeds. In 1924, Arthur was a Member for Life of the university and had made substantial donations – £10,000 – to the university, as had his parents, Francis and Frances Lupton and his brothers: Charles, Hugh and F.M. Lupton. University archives record that Arthur Lupton's uncles, nieces, nephews and first cousins, including Mrs E. (Baroness von) Schunck, née Lupton, had also been generous donators and in 1924, her son-in-law, "The Right Hon. Lord Airedale", was a Member of the Court of Leeds University, having been "nominated by the Crown".

In the 1920s, Leeds-based law firm Middleton & Sons – including Leeds (Victoria) University alumni, solicitor R. Noel Middleton, his wife Olive and his sister Gertrude Middleton, also donated to university building schemes. R. Noel Middleton's wife was the niece of Pro-Chancellor Arthur Lupton.

=== Vice-Chancellor ===
The Vice-Chancellor of the university acts as the chief executive. The current Vice-Chancellor is Shearer West, the former Vice-Chancellor of the University of Nottingham. A number of former Vice-Chancellors have had university buildings or halls of residences on the campus named after them. Examples of such dedications include The Edward Boyle Library, Bodington Hall (accommodation named in honour of the first Vice-Chancellor) and The Roger Stevens Building.

Vice-Chancellors
Name	Duration
Sir Nathan Bodington	1904–1910
Sir Michael Ernest Sadler	1911–1923
Sir James Black Baillie	1924–1938
Bernard Mouat Jones	1938–1948
Charles Morris, Baron Morris of Grasmere	1948–1963
Sir Roger Stevens	1963–1970
Edward Boyle, Baron Boyle of Handsworth	1970–1981
William Walsh (Acting Vice-Chancellor)	1981–1983
Sir Edward W. Parkes	1983–1991
Sir Alan G. Wilson	1991–2004
Michael Arthur	2004–2013
Sir Alan Langlands	2013–2020
Simone Buitendijk	2020–2023
Shearer West	2024–

=== Finances ===
In the financial year ending 31 July 2023, the University of Leeds had the eighth highest turnover out of all British universities with a total income of £979.5 million (2021/22 – £924.7 million) and total expenditure of £906.1 million (2021/22 – £1.043 billion). Key sources of income included £505.8 million from tuition fees and education contracts (2021/22 – £499.3 million), £184.9 million from research grants and contracts (2021/22 – £177.3 million), £107.0 million from funding body grants (2021/22 – £95.2 million), and £15.1 million from donations and endowment (2021/22 – £10.7 million).

At year end the University of Leeds had endowments of £83.2 million (2021/22 – £87.4 million), placing it within the top twenty in the country, and total net assets of £897.7 million (2021/22 – £773.1 million).

== Student life ==
=== Students' Union ===
The Leeds University Union is a National Union of Students affiliated body, located on the main university campus. The union's main purpose is to support Leeds students through providing socialising opportunities, societies and group support, help and advisory services and to aid students wishing to volunteer, campaign and engage with the local communities. The Leeds University Union is also a founding member of the Aldwych Group, which represents the students' unions of the members of the Russell Group.

The University of Leeds Refectory is the university's main canteen during the day, serving a range of hot and cold food whilst in the evenings it is converted into one of Leeds's largest music venues, having a 2,100-person capacity for live events. Many famous bands and musicians have played at the University of Leeds Refectory throughout their careers. These include The Who who recorded Live at Leeds at the venue (originally in 1970, and then returned in June 2006 to recreate the original show), Bob Marley and the Wailers (as heard on the remastered 2004 Deluxe edition of Burnin' ), Jimi Hendrix, Led Zeppelin, Pink Floyd, and more recently Muse (recorded and played on MTV), The Strokes, Bloc Party, Manic Street Preachers, KT Tunstall, Arctic Monkeys, The Coral and Paul Weller.

==== Student newspaper ====
The Gryphon (formerly known as the Leeds Student) is the weekly student newspaper, published free every Friday during term-time and distributed around the University of Leeds. The articles are written by students, and are largely about local and student based issues. It is one of the country's most active university newspapers and regularly wins national student media awards. Leeds Student was formed in 1970 by the merger of the Leeds University Union newspaper (Union News) and the then Leeds Polytechnic Students Union newspaper, but in November 2005 Leeds Metropolitan University students voted to disaffiliate from Leeds Student, citing under-representation. The name was changed to The Gryphon in 2014.

Leeds Student was the 2009 winner of The Guardian Student Newspaper of the Year award and short-listed for The Guardian Student Magazine of the Year. Former editors of the newspaper include Paul Vallely (The Independent) and Nicholas Witchell (BBC News).

==== Leeds Student Radio ====
Leeds University Union also operates the student radio station Leeds Student Radio, broadcasting live on their website from 9 am to midnight every day during term time.

==== LSTV (Leeds Student Television) ====
LSTV (Leeds Student Television) is a student television station run by students from the University of Leeds. LSTV produces weekly video content such as Entertainment programme 'On Campus', Sports programme 'Sideline' and News programme 'The Essential', which focuses on local and university news affecting students at the University of Leeds and the local Leeds community.

==== Awards ====
Leeds University Union (LUU) won the award for the Higher Education Students' Union of the Year at the NUS Awards 2009. In 2008, the union was voted runner up for the award of Higher Education Students' Union of the Year however did win first prize for Equality and Diversity.

In 2008, the Leeds University Union became the first student union to achieve Gold Status in the Students' Union Evaluation Initiative (SUEI). A feat only matched by the University of Sheffield Union of Students in mid 2010.

=== Sport ===
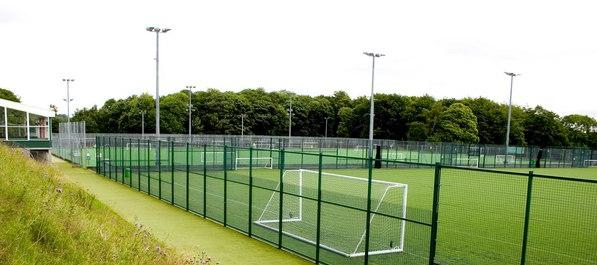
Weetwood Playing Fields

The university has teams that compete regularly in the British Universities and Colleges Sport (BUCS) leagues and as of 2016 was ranked 14th in the country.

Each year the university supports over 20 elite athletes, providing a funding, support services and an interface with university academic departments, to ensure elite athletes have the infrastructure that allows them to compete at the highest level whilst studying. The university also offers sporting scholarships to elite athletes in conjunction with Npower whilst offering Olympic scholarships to prospects preparing to compete at future Olympic Games.

The university competes annually in the Christie Cup, a competition dating back to 1886 which sees the former Victoria Universities of Leeds, Liverpool and Manchester participate in 28 different sports. After the rivalry between Oxford and Cambridge, the Christie's Championships is the oldest inter–university competition on the English sporting calendar. (Note: Fourth oldest in the United Kingdom and one of the oldest in the world. The Scottish Varsity match in rugby union between the University of St Andrews and the University of Edinburgh dates to the 1860s. The Scottish Boat Race between the University of Glasgow and the University of Edinburgh was first held in 1877. In the United States, the Harvard–Yale Regatta dates back to 1852. The 1869 Princeton vs. Rutgers football game was the first intercollegiate football (soccer) game in the U.S. while the first intercollegiate rugby football game took place in 1874 when Harvard University played McGill University.)

The university is a member of the MCC University Centres of Cricketing Excellence alongside the Cardiff, Cambridge, Durham, Loughborough and Oxford, where talented young cricketers can further their academic education whilst receiving an expert levels of cricket coaching and competitive match play.

University of Leeds Sport offer a wide range of competitive and participation sports, which is used by the student and local population of Leeds who may use certain university facilities. Alongside fitness classes such as yoga and aerobics, the university offers over 36 different sporting clubs, including cricket, football, rugby union, hockey, basketball and badminton which have achieved league and cup wins in the British Universities and Colleges Sport (BUCS) league.

Whilst the university operated performance and elite level sports, there is an intramural recreational sport programme which is one of the largest of any Higher Education institution in Britain. The Leeds University Union has over 60 sports clubs which range from Cycling to Sailing.

A £20 million spending plan was sanctioned with the aim to add facilities to the university's sporting provisions, including a 25m, 8 lane swimming pool and a 200 station health and fitness centre (known as The Edge) which opened in May 2010. The Gryphon Sports Centre opened in 2008 after a £2.5 million refurbishment, and caters for racquet sports including badminton and squash whilst the Weetwood Playing Fields are used for football, rugby union, rugby league and hockey. The Brownlee Centre and Bodington cycle circuit were opened in April 2017 and named after alumni Alistair and Jonny Brownlee. Construction was funded by Sport England, UK Sport, British Cycling, British Triathlon and the university.

The university also offers a range of sporting opportunities for students to gain experience and develop their skills by volunteering within the local community. Volunteers can take up posts that include coaching, events organisation, stewarding and sports administration.

=== Accommodation ===
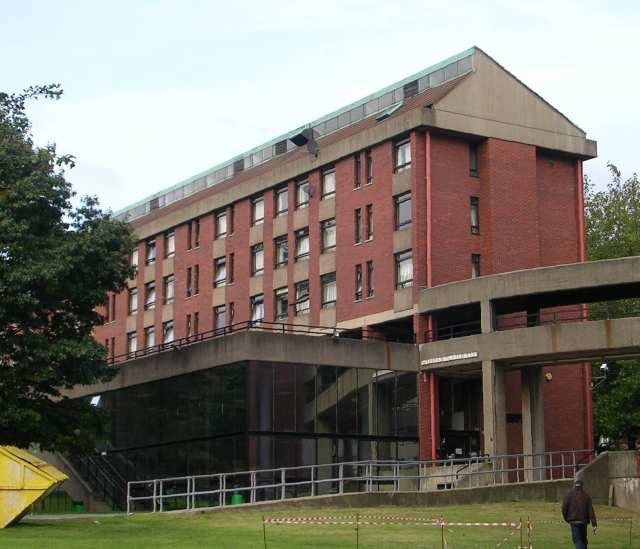
Mary Ogilvie House (now demolished), student accommodation on the main campus

The university provides accommodation in either catered or self-catering rooms, mostly reserved for first year undergraduate students but also for international students, postgraduates, staff and undergraduates who have been unable to find alternative accommodation.

Four of the halls (Charles Morris Hall, Henry Price Building, Ellerslie Hall and Lyddon Hall) are on the campus, while other halls and self-catering accommodation are located throughout the city. Bodington Hall is approximately four miles north-west of the campus, Devonshire Hall is situated just under a mile off the main campus, and other accommodation includes Carr Mills, Liberty Dock, James Baillie Park, Leodis Residences, Lupton Residences, Montague Burton Residences, North Hill Court, Opal 3 Residences, Oxley Residences, Sentinel Towers, The Tannery, Shimmin, St Marks Residences.

In addition to providing university-owned accommodation, the university works with external accommodation providers such as Unite and Opal who provide private accommodation for both undergraduate students and postgraduates.

The university guarantees first year undergraduates, international undergraduates, undergraduate exchange students and international postgraduate students places in university-owned accommodation on condition that they meet the relevant application deadlines. In common with other institutions, it also runs schemes for students choosing Leeds as their firm or insurance choice through UCAS, with clearing students being supported once accepted.

=== Miscellaneous ===
The university's Disability Team (based within its Equality Service) arranges and provides academic support services for students who are deaf or have hearing impairments, are blind or partially sighted, have a specific learning difficulty (e.g. dyslexia), have a physical impairment or mobility difficulty, have a long-term medical condition or have a mental health difficulty.

The university is one of the few universities in the UK to include an on-campus Transcription Centre, managed in conjunction with the RNIB. The Transcription Centre produces information in a range of accessible formats (including braille, large print, e-text and audio formats) for blind and partially sighted students and staff members – both at Leeds and at other universities, colleges and schools.

== Notable people ==
=== Alumni ===
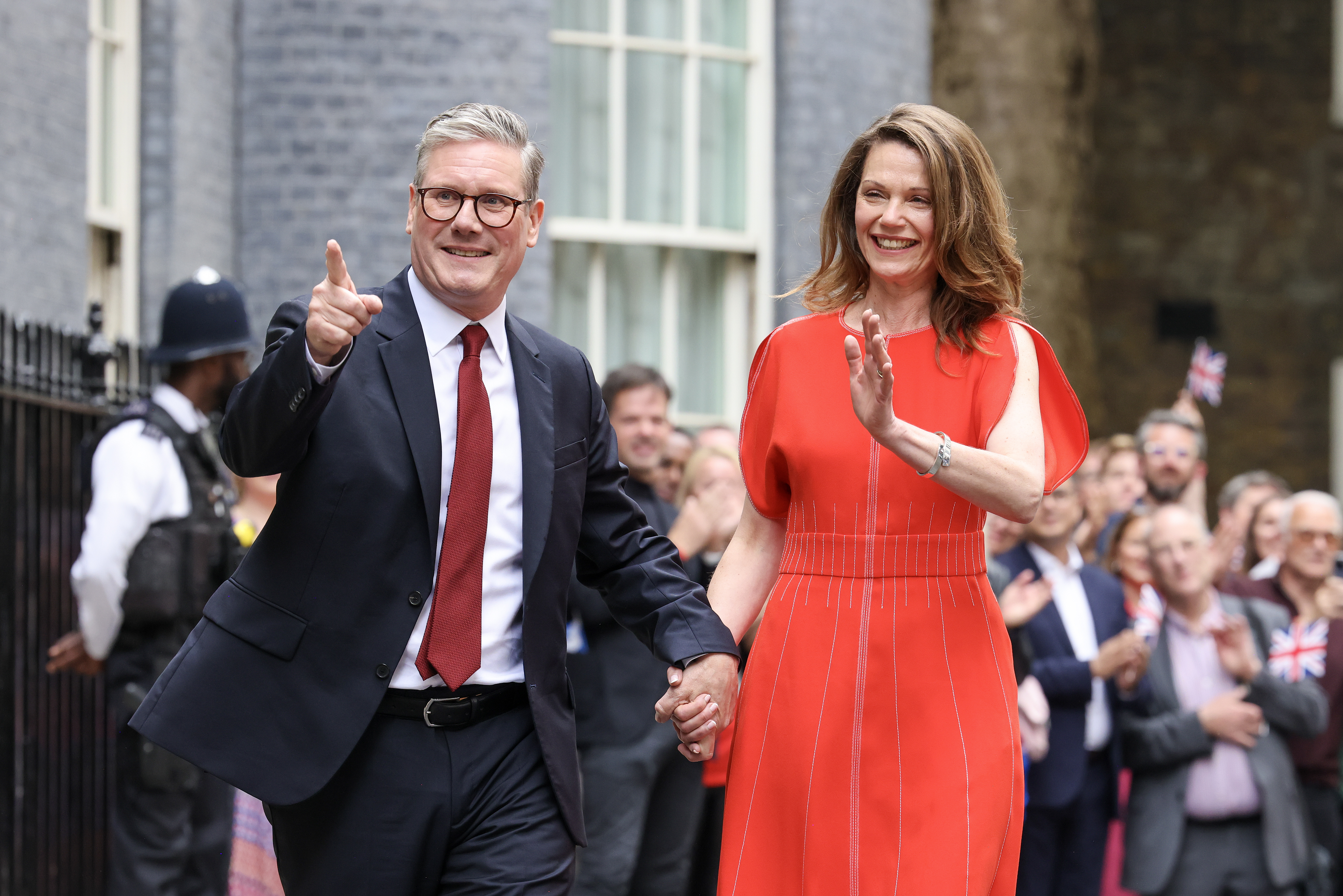
Keir Starmer, Prime Minister of the United Kingdom

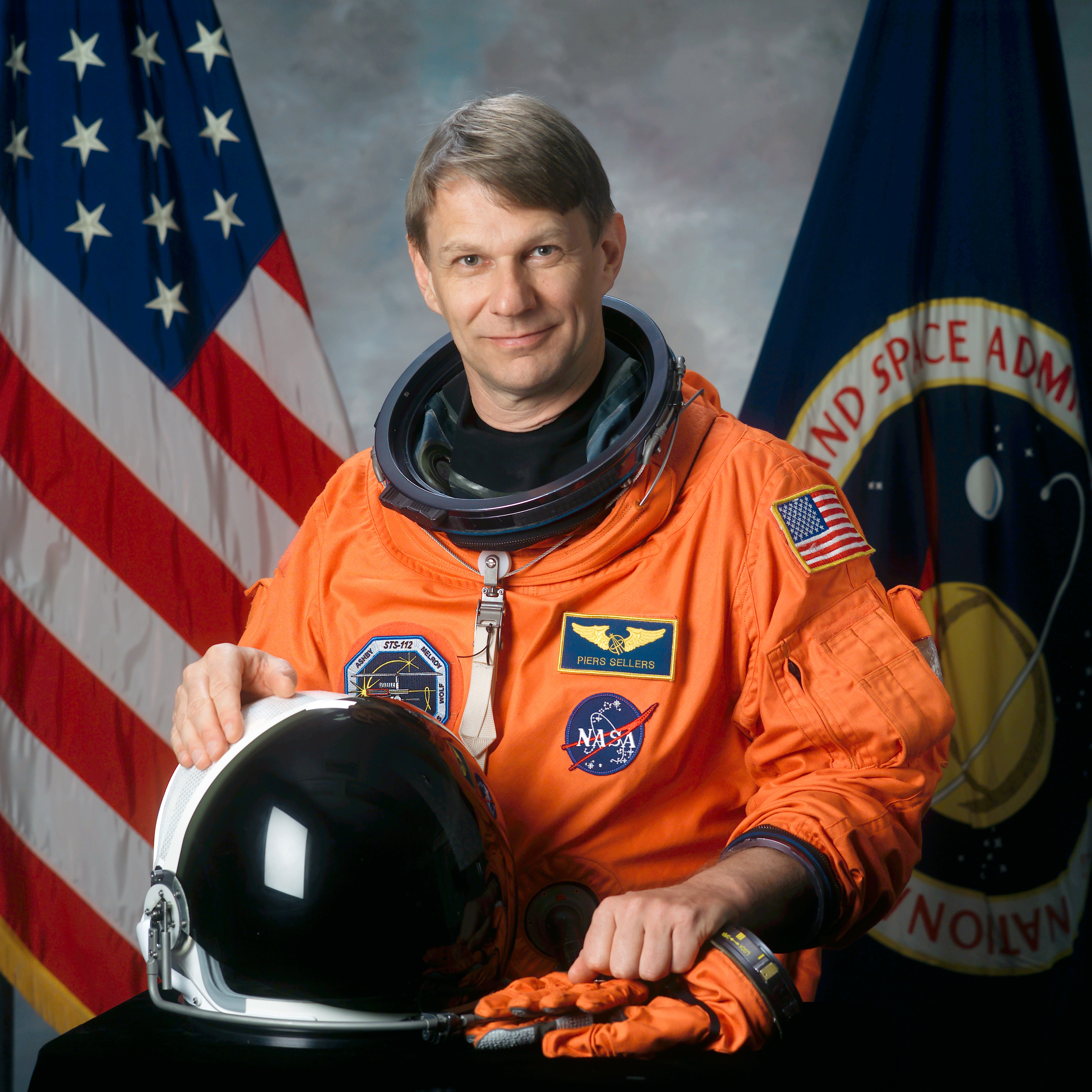
Piers Sellers, veteran of three Space Shuttle missions

Alumni from the arts include musicians Dan Smith, Kyle Simmons and Chris Wood of the band Bastille; Mark Knopfler of the band Dire Straits; Simon Rix, bassist of Leeds-based band the Kaiser Chiefs; singers Corinne Bailey Rae and Little Boots; and all of the members of alt-J. Film director Shona Auerbach, impersonator and actor Alistair McGowan, screenwriter Jeremy Dyson, Hong Kong singer and actor Leslie Cheung, composer Estelle White, actress Emma Mackey and poet Tony Harrison are also alumni of the university.

Alumni from the humanities and social sciences include author Sir Ken Robinson, author, academic and critic Robert Anthony Welch and the philosopher and author Paul Crowther.

Former Leeds students involved in international organisations and politics include multiple current and former UK Members of Parliament and politicians, including former Prime Minister of the United Kingdom Keir Starmer, former Foreign Secretary Jack Straw, and cabinet ministers Clare Short and Sayeeda Warsi. The former President of Mongolia, Nambaryn Enkhbayar, Former President of Namibia, Hage Geingob, current Secretary General of the OECD, Ángel Gurría, Malaysia politician state of Terengganu, Ahmad Samsuri Mokhtar, the former Secretary General of the Red Cross, Bekele Geleta, and the current President of Ireland Catherine Connolly, also studied at the university.

Alumni from the media and related areas include the former Editor of the Daily Mail newspaper, Paul Dacre, world music broadcaster and DJs Andy Kershaw and Liz Kershaw, Moda Operandi editor Tatiana Hambro, IMDb founder Col Needham as well as CNN International news presenter, Richard Quest. Founder Carrie Rose, BBC News Editorial Director Kamal Ahmed, political cartoonist Steve Bell, foreign correspondent Mark Brayne, television presenters Jenni Falconer and Georgie Thompson, BBC Medical editor Fergus Walsh, BBC News royal correspondent Nicholas Witchell and former BBC executive Alan Yentob.

Former students in the field of science and technology include NASA astronaut Piers Sellers, Nobel Prize winner and president of the Royal Society George Porter, researcher into breast cancer and the development of cancer drug Tamoxifen V. Craig Jordan, Edmund Happold, founder of Buro Happold, Col Needham founder of IMDb and materials scientist Stephen Eichhorn.

Former students in sport include triathletes Alistair Brownlee and Jonathan Brownlee, ocean rower and former UK MP Dan Byles, Paratriathlete Claire Cashmore, Alpine climber Kenton Cool, as well as England rugby union players Tom Palmer and Alex Lozowski.

Former students in medicine and health sciences include Harold Shipman.

Former students in religion include Christina Beardsley.

=== Nobel Prize winners ===
A number of Nobel laureates have worked or studied at the university.

- Sir William Henry Bragg (awarded the Nobel Prize in Physics in 1915), for his services (with his son William Lawrence Bragg) in the analysis of crystal structure by means of X-rays.
- George Porter (awarded the Nobel Prize in Chemistry in 1967) – University of Leeds graduate – for studies of extremely fast chemical reactions (flash photolysis).
- Wole Soyinka (awarded the Nobel Prize in Literature in 1986) – University of Leeds graduate – the Nigerian writer was awarded for the Nobel Prize for Literature in 1986.
- Archer John Porter Martin (awarded the Nobel Prize in Chemistry in 1952), was an English chemist who shared the Nobel Prize in Chemistry for the invention of partition chromatography with Richard Synge.
- Richard Laurence Millington Synge (awarded the Nobel Prize in Chemistry in 1952), was a British biochemist, and shared the Nobel Prize in Chemistry for the invention of partition chromatography with Archer Martin. It was during his time in Leeds that he worked with Archer Martin, developing partition chromatography, a technique used in the separation mixtures of similar chemicals, that revolutionized analytical chemistry.

=== Honorary graduates ===
Since the university was granted its own royal charter in 1904, the university has awarded honorary degrees (honoris causa) to notable individuals as part of their yearly graduation ceremonies. The degree awarded itself can vary but is typically a doctorate or, less commonly, a master's degree, and may be awarded to someone who has no prior connection with the university.

== Other history ==
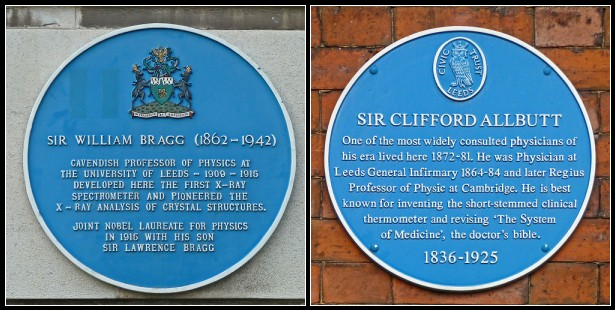
Blue Plaques at Leeds University

St George's Field, part of the University of Leeds campus, is the former Woodhouse Cemetery, where is buried Pablo Fanque (William Darby), who was a black circus proprietor for 30 years during the Victorian period. Fanque's wife, Susannah Darby, is also buried at the cemetery. There is a monument that Fanque erected to her, and a smaller monument to him. John Lennon referenced Fanque in The Beatles song "Being for the Benefit of Mr. Kite!" on the album Sgt. Pepper's Lonely Hearts Club Band. On 8 October 2010, the Leeds University Union, as part of the university's annual Light Night celebration, unveiled a commemorative plaque at Fanque's and Darby's gravesite.

There are several Blue Plaques on the campus, including those awarded to Clifford Allbutt and William Henry Bragg.

Over the weekend of the 16–17 March 1974, the UK's first national trans conference ‘Transvestism and Transsexualism in Modern Society’, organised by the Beaumont Society, was held at the University of Leeds.

== Arms ==
Coat of arms of University of Leeds
Notes Granted 10 August 1905. Crest On a wreath Argent and Vert, a Greek sphinx Gules. Escutcheon Vert, an open book Proper, edged and clasped Gold, inscribed with the words "Et augebitur scientia", between in chief three mullets Argent and in base a rose of the last barbed and seeded Proper.

== See also ==
- Armorial of UK universities
- DugOut Theatre
- List of modern universities in Europe (1801–1945)
- List of universities in the UK
