= DugOut Theatre =

British theatre company

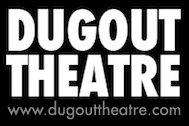
- Formation: 2009
- Founders: George Chilcott, Ed Smith
- Type: Theatre group
- Location: London, Leeds, Edinburgh
- Artistic director: George Chilcott

DugOut Theatre is a British theatre company founded in 2009 by students at the University of Leeds.

== Background ==
The idea to start DugOut emerged in 2009 when George Chilcott and Ed Smith, both students at the University of Leeds, decided to put on a production of Journey's End independently of the University's own theatre society. In 2010, the company was resurrected and formally established as a means of taking Chilcott's production of Patrick Marber's Dealer's Choice to the Edinburgh Fringe. After achieving widespread acclaim for the production both in Edinburgh and during its successful Leeds run, the decision was taken to continue the company as a longer-term project. Since then, a total of six plays have been produced by the company, with two of them forming DugOut's return to the Edinburgh Fringe in 2011.

== Production history ==
=== Journey's End ===
Directed by Ed Smith, R.C. Sherriff's First World War drama would serve as part of the inspiration for DugOut's name (a dugout being a common feature of trench warfare). The production starred several future company members, including Jimmy Walters and Ekow Quartey. It was performed in the Alec Clegg Theatre at the stage@leeds in May 2009. Other cast included Tom Gill, Jamie Laign, Andy Jordan, Tom Holloway and George Chillcott taking the lead role of Stanhope.

=== Dealer's Choice ===
Patrick Marber's first play was directed by George Chilcott in Mine, the Leeds University Union, in May 2010. After its success in Leeds, the production was moved to Edinburgh for the 2010 Fringe Festival, where it garnered renewed acclaim and became a sell-out show. Chilcott's decision to introduce choreography to scene changes was met with high praise and would become a staple of future DugOut work. The Edinburgh show was selected by the National Student Drama Festival to be performed in Scarborough in 2011, and was exceptionally well-received there, receiving a commendation ensemble acting. Cast included: Jimmy Walters, Harry Williams, Will Barwick and Ed Smith.

=== Hay Fever ===
Ed Smith returned to directing after his success on the stage as Mugsy in Dealer's Choice with Noël Coward's 1924 farce. Combining the choreography and pace crafted in Dealer's Choice with Coward's text proved popular with audiences, and Hay Fever became the first of DugOut's shows to be awarded five stars. Particular mention was made of Smith's use of a live band on stage, complete with a smoking jacket-clad, wisecracking pianist. Hay Fever ran at the stage@leeds in from 3 November to 6 November 2010.

=== Othello ===
Ekow Quartey starred as the title role in DugOut's first Shakespeare production. As director once again, George Chilcott set the piece in a Venice much like 1960s America, with the far-off war in Cyprus bearing similarities to Vietnam. After a successful run in the stage@leeds in February 2011, Othello was selected to go to the Edinburgh Fringe later in the same year. It was performed in the Loft at the Zoo Roxy, and was relatively well-received, with Chilcott's setting and eye for detail, the use of music, and both Quartey's Othello and Tom Black's Iago receiving praise from reviewers.

=== Bouncers Remix ===
DugOut chose to put on an updated version of John Godber's popular play in a non-theatre space in March 2011. After a successful three night run in The Hi-Fi Club, Bouncers Remix was chosen to be one of DugOut's two shows at the 2011 Edinburgh Fringe, being performed in the Sanctuary at the Zoo Roxy throughout August 2011. Originally proposed and envisioned by Will Brown (who was eventually cast in the role of Lucky Eric), the production was directed by Tom Black.

=== The Birthday Party ===
DugOut's production of Harold Pinter's 1958 play combined the company's signature styles of movement and scene changes with first-time director Harry Williams' eye for dialogue. Bringing in new members to the company, it ran from 2 November to 5 November 2011 in the stage@leeds, and was praised for its realistic set and 'astounding lucidity' with which dialogue was delivered.

=== Inheritance Blues ===
In December 2011, DugOut announced plans to perform their first all-new piece of writing. It was revealed in January 2012 that the play, devised by the cast, would be called Inheritance Blues and star Tom Black, Will Brown, Luke Murphy, Henry Perryment, Ed Smith and Harry Williams, with Chilcott returning as director. The play, based around a wake at which a blues band unexpectedly arrive, features live music and a cappella singing. The show was very well-received, being selected for the National Student Drama Festival and being awarded the judges' award for devising. It also won the popular vote for the Festgoers' Award, voted for by everyone at the festival. DugOut were invited to perform Inheritance Blues at the Bedlam Theatre for the Edinburgh Fringe, where it earned a string of four and five star reviews and was nominated for three Musical Theatre Network awards and The Stage Student Choice Award after a sell-out run.

=== Cover ===
Phoebe Sparrow, Nina Shenkman, Hugh Coles and Sam Ripman starred in this intimate comedy about secrets, set in a mysteriously empty London flat. After a well-received run at the stage@leeds, Cover transferred to C Nova for the Edinburgh Fringe, with Tom Black replacing Sam Ripman in the cast. The Edinburgh run of the show earned four stars from both ThreeWeeks and Broadway Baby, with Nina Shenkman earning particular praise.

=== Fade ===
In November 2012, DugOut began the devising process for their third new work by attending Unlimited Theatre's Uninspire workshop at the West Yorkshire Playhouse. In April 2013, the company travelled to France to devise what would become Fade, joined by acclaimed writer and performer Alexander Owen. After an open devising process, Owen wrote the script for Fade and the play premiered at the Bedlam Theatre in August 2013.

== Reception ==
DugOut's productions have been broadly well received by critics. Dealer's Choice had its performances described as 'remarkable' and was awarded four stars by ThreeWeeks. FringeReview said Hay Fever 'oozes with professionalism', while Leeds Student called it 'a perfectly balanced display of comedy'. Othello received four stars from WhatsOnStage and Joe Miller, writing for The Guardian, praised the high standard of the cast and the believable characterisation. Miller did however say he felt that 'the production doesn't really capitalise on the contextual transition' and suggested more could have been done to update the piece. Praise was particularly high for Bouncers Remix, which received five stars from both ThreeWeeks and EdFringe Review. The latter review praised, in particular, physicality and 'charisma and energy' of the cast. John Godber himself saw the production while it was in Edinburgh, and remarked on the precision with which the actors performed on stage.

More generally, the company and its style has been assessed by critics. The U Review called them 'a force to be reckoned with', while Kevin Berry, writing in The Stage, said the group 'bristles with talent and stage presence. All of them will make a mark in theatre.' ‘It’s in the sheer energy and focus of the performances that DugOut truly hits its stride’, said Lee Anderson of A Younger Theatre. Lizzie Edmonds of Fringe Review said DugOut possess 'a plethora of directorial talent' and 'don't just man the doors of the young Leeds theatre scene. They are slowly becoming the very foundations of it.' However, Edmonds also expressed a view that it would be interesting to see DugOut move to some 'more risky material', citing their tendency not to move away from 'solid classics'.

At the 2011 National Student Drama Festival, DugOut received a commendation for ensemble acting for their revival of Dealer's Choice, while George Chilcott won the Director's Guild Award for Best Director.
