= The Gryphon =

Student newspaper for the University of Leeds

- Front page on 15 November 2019
- Type: Bi-weekly Newspaper
- Format: Compact
- School: University of Leeds
- Owner: Leeds University Union
- Editor: Daniel Brown
- Founded: 30 October 1946; 79 years ago
- Headquarters: Leeds University Union; Leeds LS2 9JZ
- Country: United Kingdom
- ISSN: 2057-1038
- Website: www.thegryphon.co.uk

The Gryphon is the student newspaper of the University of Leeds. It is published monthly during term time and its editor, the newspaper's only paid position, is elected annually by Leeds University Union members. The articles are written by students and are largely about local and university issues.

The Gryphon was founded in 1946 as Union News, before merging with Leeds Polytechnic Students Union's Pact in 1970 to become Leeds Student. In 2005, Leeds Metropolitan University students voted to disaffiliate from the newspaper, citing under-representation. Leeds Student was renamed The Gryphon in 2014 in a return to the name used by an earlier University of Leeds student publication.

The editorship became a full-time, paid sabbatical position in 1972 after a campaign led by the then editor, Paul Vallely, who went on to become the first sabbatical editor. Notable previous editors also include Paul Dacre, Jay Rayner and Nicholas Witchell.

== History ==
A Leeds student publication titled The Gryphon was originally established in 1897 as "The Journal of the Yorkshire College". The Gryphon ceased printing in 1963.

Union News was established as the official newspaper of Leeds University Union in 1946.

In 1970 the students unions of Leeds University and the then Leeds Polytechnic voted to amalgamate their newspapers into a single publication entitled Leeds Student. In its first year of existence (1970–71) and again two years later (1972–73) the paper was voted Student Newspaper of the Year in the Student Media Awards.

The paper has subsequently been awarded the accolade of Publication of the Year in the Guardian Student Media Awards in 1998, 1999 and 2009.

The Leeds Student was also the winner of the Best Student Newspaper award in the inaugural National Student Journalism Awards in 1999 organised by the National Union of Students and The Independent newspaper.

=== Leeds Metropolitan University Students Union's dissociation ===
In December 2005, Leeds Metropolitan University Students Union (LMUSU) members chose via ballot to dissociate from the paper. In the past, this had been a joint venture between the two universities, but after continued complaints of a Leeds University centred perspective, a referendum was called to decide whether LMUSU should retain its link with the paper and continue paying a small proportion toward the paper's expenses. Members voted to dissolve the link, and henceforth the paper is a solely Leeds University Union maintained enterprise.

=== iPad app ===
In 2012 the Leeds Student newspaper became the first student newspaper in the UK to launch an iPad edition. The app was built by the paper's 2011/12 Editor Elizabeth Edmonds and 2011/12 Digital Editor Jack Dearlove using QuarkXpress 9's app building tools. The app delivers a digitally remastered version of highlights from each week's paper through Apple's Newsstand.

=== Name change ===
In 2014 Leeds Student was renamed back to The Gryphon under elected editor Jasmine Andersson.

=== Closure threat ===
In 2014 a funding issue almost led to the closure of the paper due to a dispute with the students union about advertising but closure was averted.

== Controversy ==
Leeds Student has stirred debate over a variety of articles. These range from a full-page interview with BNP leader Nick Griffin, in which a remark that homosexuals should be kept in the closet and the door behind them "kept firmly shut" (as well as other, race-based comments) caused great offence.

In April 2010 Leeds Student again found itself at the centre of racial controversy after an issue dated 30 April was removed from circulation by Leeds University Union representatives. The issue in question featured a comment by Palestinian journalist Sameh Habeeb regarding beliefs in a pro-Israeli bias in the media. Following alleged complaints from Jewish students, the newspaper was removed by LUU executives, leading to accusations of censorship of the paper, which had previously been treated as an independent entity within LUU. After an attempted campaign to force a motion of no confidence in the leadership of Communications and Internal Affairs Officer Jak Codd, who was responsible for the anti-Semitism allegations, Codd resigned from his post, citing racial tensions within the union.

=== Frank Ellis ===
In February/March 2006, the paper published an interview by Matt Kennard, a Leeds Student journalist, with Dr Frank Ellis, a controversial professor of Russian and Slavonic Studies who has expressed his support for racial differences in average intelligence. Dr Ellis's comments were widely condemned. A campaign was launched by Hanif Leylabi, President of the LUU branch of Unite Against Fascism, which called upon the university to sack Ellis. The story received coverage in The Observer, The Daily Telegraph, The Independent, Times Higher Education and various other national newspapers and radio stations as well as national and local television services. A statement was released by Leeds University Union calling for his dismissal. Leeds University condemned Ellis' views as "abhorrent".

Ellis was subsequently suspended by the Vice-Chancellor, Michael Arthur, pending disciplinary proceedings. The university issued a media release stating that it was investigating an alleged breach of its diversity policy. It also said Ellis's views were wholly at odds with the university's values, he had jeopardised the university's obligations under the Race Relations (Amendment) Act 2000, and that he had not apologised for his remarks. Dr Ellis took early retirement in June 2006, pre-empting the outcome of the disciplinary action.

== Notable editors ==
Former editors of The Gryphon and its predecessors include:

- Paul Dacre (1968–69), editor of the Daily Mail
- Jay Rayner (1987–88), journalist and food critic for The Observer
- Paul Vallely (1972–73), author, correspondent for The Times, and columnist for The Independent
- Nicholas Witchell (1974–75), journalist for BBC News
