= Colin Norris =

Scottish serial killer

- Mug shot of Norris, taken by West Yorkshire Police
- Born: Colin Campbell Norris; 12 February 1976 (age 50); Milton, Glasgow, Scotland
- Criminal charges: Murder (4 counts), attempted murder (1 count)
- Penalty: Life imprisonment with a minimum tariff of 30 years imprisonment

Details
- Victims: 4–10 murder victims, 1 victim of attempted murder
- Span of crimes: May – November 2002
- Country: England
- Locations: Leeds General Infirmary and St James's University Hospital, Leeds
- Weapon: Overdoses of insulin
- Date apprehended: 2002
- Imprisoned at: HM Prison Frankland

Colin Campbell Norris (born 12 February 1976) is a British serial killer who was convicted of the murder of four elderly patients and the attempted murders of two others in two hospitals in Leeds, England, in 2002.

A police investigation showed Norris to be on duty when five patients fell into sudden hypoglycaemic comas. Suspicions were raised when Norris predicted that healthy Ethel Hall would die at 5:15 am one morning, which is when she went into cardiac arrest, and tests revealed that she had been injected with an extremely high level of man-made insulin. Insulin was missing from the hospital fridge and Norris had last accessed it, only half an hour before Hall fell unconscious.

Subsequent investigations would find that the unnatural hypoglycaemic attacks followed him when he was transferred to a second hospital, and hospital records revealed that only he could not be eliminated as a suspect. Detectives believed that Norris was responsible for up to six other suspicious deaths where only he was always present, but a lack of post mortem evidence and other factors meant that investigators and the Crown Prosecution Service could not pursue convictions for these deaths.

Doubts were later raised about his conviction by, among others, Vincent Marks, an expert on insulin poisoning, who concluded from his own studies that there was a 1 in 10 chance that each patient's arrest could have happened naturally. However, others have pointed out that C-peptides are produced in hypoglycaemic attacks caused by insulin produced naturally in the body, and these were not detected in any of the blood tests of the victims, indicating that the insulin had been introduced to their bodies externally and artificially. Norris lost an appeal against his conviction in 2009. In February 2021, the Criminal Cases Review Commission referred the case back to the Court of Appeal; this second appeal, heard in 2025, was also unsuccessful.

Norris is believed to have been inspired by Jessie McTavish, a fellow Scottish nurse who was convicted of murdering a patient with insulin in 1974 before having her conviction quashed in 1975. The incident had happened at Ruchill Hospital in Glasgow, less than a mile from where Norris grew up. Shortly before he registered as a nurse, he had learned about McTavish.

== Background ==
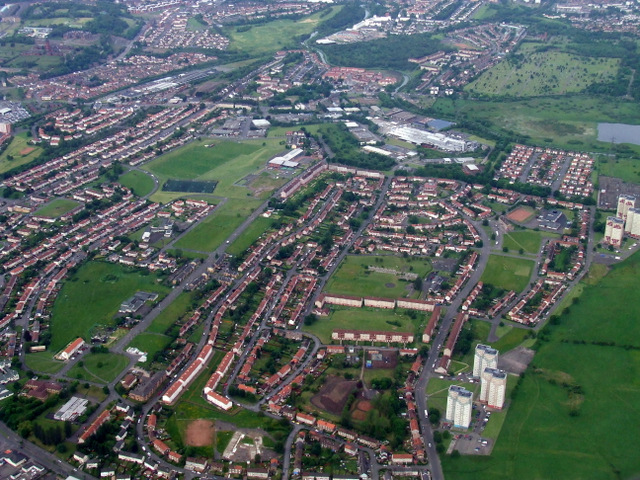
The Milton area of Glasgow, where Norris grew up and where he lived up until the trial. Ruchill Hospital, where the infamous Jessie McTavish incident took place which Norris learned about at university, can be seen in the distance at the top left-hand corner of the image (the building with the tall brick tower).

Norris was born and brought up in the Milton area of Glasgow, Scotland. He originally worked as a travel agent after leaving college, but after a few years in this role decided to retrain as a nurse. Friends described him as someone who loved being centre stage, and said he enjoyed amateur dramatics. His academic record was average, but he became known for being quick to anger and his aggressive confrontations with tutors and, later, employers. His behaviour towards university lecturers at the University of Dundee was described as "unacceptable". He constantly argued with his tutor, later saying that she "and I didn't exactly see eye to eye. I had a personality clash, basically 'cos I had one and she never, and she was my personal tutor." Shortly before he qualified, this tutor was known to have taught Norris about Jessie McTavish, a nurse convicted of murdering a patient with insulin at Ruchill Hospital in Glasgow, less than a mile from where Norris grew up. McTavish's conviction was overturned on appeal. Norris was then tasked with "reviewing" her conduct by the tutor. Learning about McTavish would later be regarded as a likely inspiration for Norris, and he would have believed at this point that insulin would be the "perfect" weapon for murder as it leaves the blood very quickly.

Norris began working at Leeds General Infirmary after qualifying in June 2001, but quickly fell out with experienced authority figures, finding it difficult to be told 'no' or what to do. Colleagues recounted him saying that he didn't like working on minor injury wards or with old people and wanted to work in the emergency department because it was more 'exciting' for him. He said he "wasn't put on this earth to sit in an office." The hospital later found out that he had been secretly working as a nurse in other hospitals on occasions when he claimed to be off sick or attending a training course.

His former partner said after his conviction that Norris had once hit him during an argument, bruising his head and once threw a bottle at him, which caused him to break up with Norris. He also said that, around the time of the murders, Norris had become engrossed by a storyline in Holby City, in which a serial killer nurse played by Rachel Leskovac killed patients with insulin before eventually being uncovered as a murderer. This same storyline is believed to have inspired another UK nurse, Benjamin Geen, to kill his patients. In the month in which he began killing patients with overdoses, Geen appeared in an edition of the Banbury Citizen which featured an interview with Leskovac. Norris's partner also revealed, after Norris's conviction, that Norris had experimented on his cat Casper before he began killing patients, injecting it with a lethal dose of insulin. The partner had reported him to the police but Norris claimed the cat had died from hitting its head on a wall.

== Murders ==
=== Ethel Hall ===
At the time of the murders, Norris worked at Leeds General Infirmary and St James's University Hospital in Leeds, having qualified as a nurse only a year earlier. Suspicions were raised when Norris predicted the death of one patient, Ethel Hall, saying to a fellow nurse hours before: "I predict 5:15 a.m. as being the time Ethel Hall will become unwell" since he "had a feeling about her". He said that he thought Hall was "going off tonight" and that he was a "jinx" on the hospital. This was despite there being no medical indications of an impending illness, and Hall being on the ward only for a fractured hip. Norris complained that he would have to fill out the paperwork for her death. Hall duly fell catastrophically ill that morning around 5 a.m. and she died some weeks later. When nurses including Norris came to tend to her, he tapped his watch and said to the nurse he had predicted Hall's illness earlier: "I told you". A doctor later recounted feeling "annoyed" at Norris's slow reaction to the collapse. An anonymous male nurse called Hall's son from the hospital at 5:30 a.m. that morning telling him that she had taken a "turn for the worse", and it was not established who this man was. The next night, Norris specifically called the ward to ask what had happened to Hall.

A blood sample was taken from Hall after a doctor raised concerns and ordered blood tests, and her blood was found to contain an inexplicably massive amount of insulin – 1000 units in just one sample – and this became the main hard evidence in the police case. The doctor who had ordered the tests was a diabetes expert who specialised in insulin and hypoglycaemic episodes, and she had believed the incident to be suspicious. No doctor or medical staff member had prescribed her this drug, and she had no condition that required it to be issued. The amount of insulin in Hall's blood was about 12 times the normal level, and it had been injected into her system. The insulin was manufactured and not produced naturally in the body. It had been injected into her abdomen, as indicated by the fact that a bulge was found under her skin there that was consistent with a large injection of fluid. Doctors believed it was done by someone with nursing or medical experience. The results of the tests led the hospital to contact the police.

It was discovered after Hall's death that insulin had also been taken from the storage fridge, and Norris later admitted that he was the last person to have accessed this fridge before Hall had been injected with insulin. Two vials of insulin were found to have been taken from the fridge, which had to have been taken by someone during the night shift which Norris was working when Hall became unwell. Norris had on a previous occasion been caught stealing drugs from the hospital. Norris also admitted that he was the last person to see Hall at 4.30 am, half an hour before she fell into the hypoglycaemic coma. at around 5 am.

=== Previous cases ===
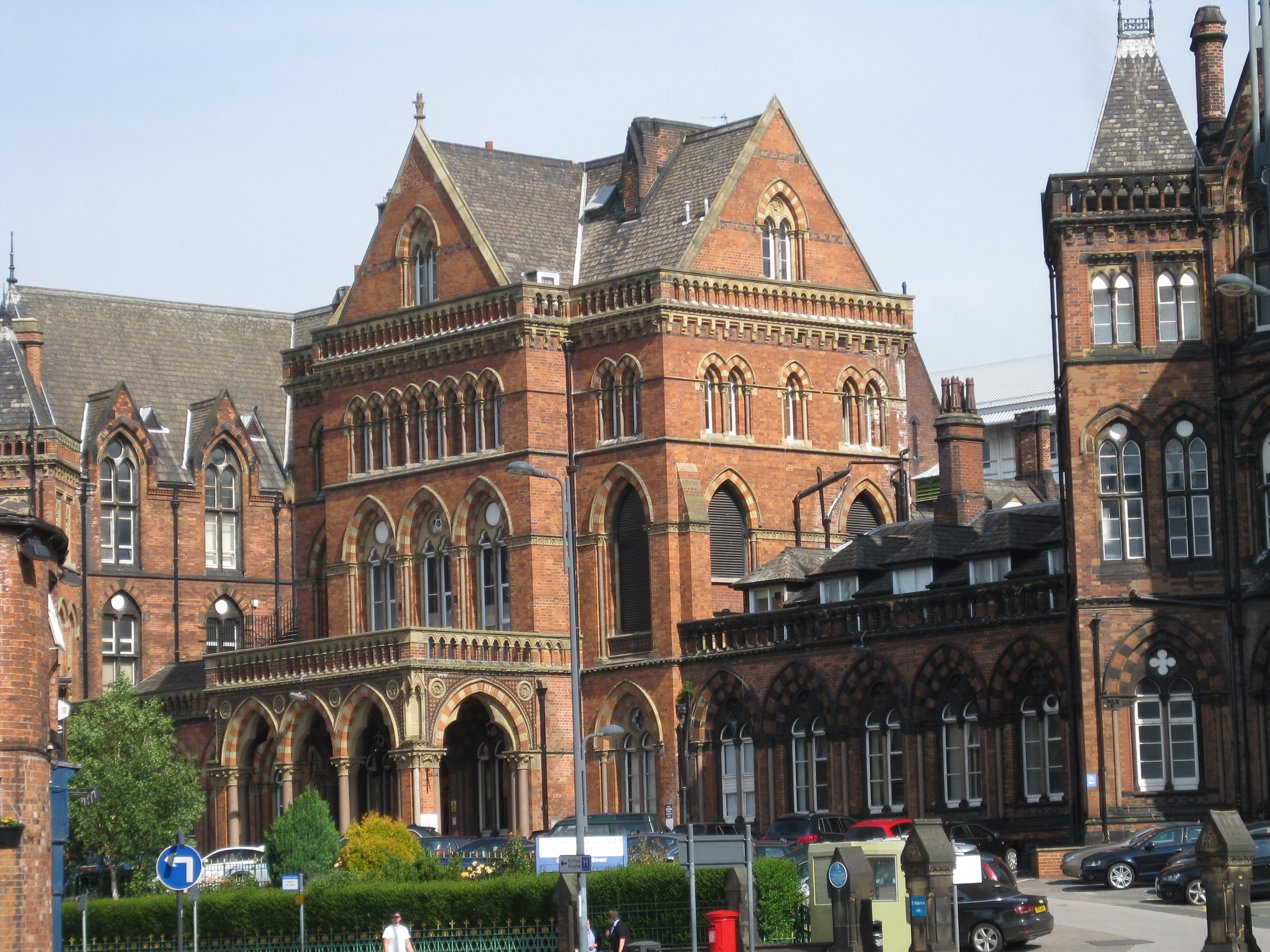
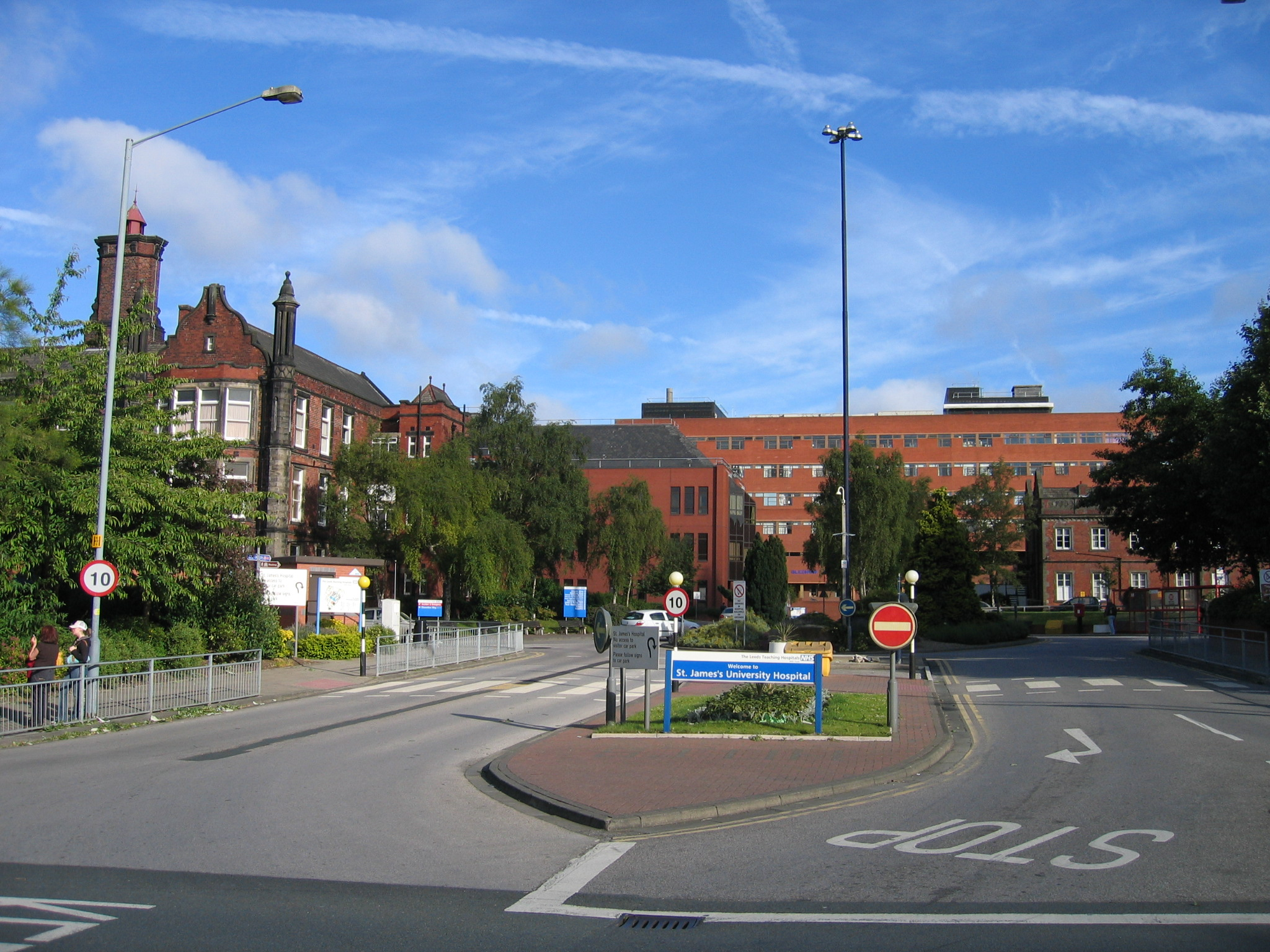
Leeds General Infirmary and St James's University Hospital, where Norris worked and where the murders were committed. Norris was the only member of staff who worked on the wards at both hospitals where the murders occurred.

Norris immediately came under suspicion and was questioned by police about Hall's murder. It was further decided to investigate the deaths of 72 people who had died on the ward while Norris was working, and a special medical panel decided that 18 of the 72 deaths should be reviewed by independent medical experts. The experts confirmed police suspicions that the deaths of three women were as a result of lethal injections of insulin, which causes hypoglycaemic attacks, but they also identified two more victims, one who had also died of insulin poisoning and another who had survived a massive injected overdose. Along with Ethel Hall, none of these women were diabetic (nor was anyone else on the ward), and all of them had been admitted to the wards simply suffering from broken hips. In any case, the amount of insulin Hall had been injected with was far in excess of what a diabetic patient would need. They were also all murdered while in non-emergency orthopaedic wards, where only minor, non-life-threatening things such as broken bones are treated. When questioned about the cases Norris said "he seemed to have been unlucky over the last 12 months."

The first three incidents occurred at Leeds General Infirmary. They began in May 2002, which also notably happened to be when the detailed probationary monitoring of Norris's early progress as a newly qualified nurse ended. On 17 May 2002, Norris injected patient Vera Wilby with an overdose of the painkiller morphine to make her drowsy (as recorded in the hospital notes and later admitted by Norris), despite the fact that she was in no pain and needed no morphine. He then administered insulin before going off shift, for no apparent medical reason. Ninety minutes after he went off shift, Wilby was found to be semi-conscious and suffering from a sudden hypoglycaemic attack, but she survived. Wilby had dementia and had been seen as a "difficult" patient by Norris. On 12 June, another patient, Doris Ludlam, was admitted to Norris's ward with a broken hip. On 25 June, she was also given an unnecessary injection of morphine (as recorded in the hospital notes and later admitted by Norris) followed by an overdose of insulin, and Norris then again went off shift. She was discovered in a coma 40 minutes after he went off shift. 88-year-old Bridget Bourke, who had been admitted to the ward on 16 June also with a broken hip, was then discovered at 3:10 a.m. on 21 July (by Norris) suffering from a hypoglycaemic attack; she died the next day.

Norris was then transferred to St James's University Hospital, and on 10 October 2002, 79-year-old Irene Crookes was admitted to Norris's new ward with a broken hip. Despite Norris recording that her condition was improving, he supposedly found her "totally unresponsive" just before 6 a.m. on 19 October, having suffered a hypoglycaemic attack. She died the next day. It was deemed significant that the bizarre cases of hypoglycaemia appeared to follow Norris when he transferred to the new hospital —especially since he was the only staff member who had been transferred. He was the only staff member who worked on both the wards in the two hospitals where all the hypoglycaemic incidents were occurring. A colleague later stated that Norris had shown no desire to revive Crookes after she fell into a coma. Another colleague also later testified that Norris had watched in "detached amusement" after one of the victims had fallen into a coma. She said that "everything he did that night had to be prompted". Significantly, it was discovered by a member of staff that they had suddenly run out of insulin after Crooke's hypoglycaemic attack.

It is believed that by the time Hall was killed, Norris had become confident he could carry on killing without being caught since no blood tests for insulin had been done. He would not have expected, therefore, a blood sample to be taken from Hall and sent to a specialist laboratory as it was, which finally led to him being caught, expecting the death would be considered due to natural causes.

None of the patients had been prescribed insulin by any doctors or medical staff members in the hospital. All the victims were considered somewhat "difficult" patients, which likely irritated Norris with his dislike for elderly patients. One of the women had been throwing her bedclothes off just before he killed her. Bourke was on Norris's ward at the same time as Ludlam and Wilby, meaning he had contact with all three at the same time. In each case, the fatal dose of insulin had been administered at night, when Norris worked. At the time of Hall's death, Norris suspiciously said to colleagues: "it is always in the morning when things go wrong" and "someone always dies when I do nights". He also would have known doctors were not on duty overnight at the hospitals, so they couldn't help the patients when they all collapsed during Norris's night shifts. Amongst the things the victims all had in common was that they were all frail women and that they all died after suffering broken hips.

== Investigation ==
It was found that the only nurse who had cared for all five of the patients and had been there within 2 hours of them becoming catastrophically ill was Norris. Norris had been one of the few who was on duty at the time of Hall's deterioration in health. Police analysed medical staff rotas, phone records and personnel files to determine who had access to the wards, insulin and who was on the wards at the time of that incident, and it was found that all staff members except Norris could be ruled out as it was only Norris who was on duty when all the incidents occurred. He was also the only staff member who worked on both the wards where the incidents occurred. Norris admitted predicting the time of Hall's death to his colleague but said it was because he had a "black sense of humour". Investigators ordered the exhumation of the body of Bridget Bourke, which, significantly, revealed that she had been given large amounts of insulin. The other two patients who had died had their bodies cremated, so could not be tested.

Norris was suspended from his job (on full pay) while the police investigation was carried out. After he was first arrested, Norris immediately left Leeds and went back to Scotland, before then leaving the UK eight times to go abroad, including to Tenerife for a six-month holiday. After his conviction his partner recounted an incident around this time when Norris became violent and drunk, and wouldn't stop crying because he said he was scared of going to prison. Norris's mother defended her son's trips around Europe, saying he was "trying to live his life the best he could while under the pressure of a police investigation".

When police questioned Norris about the fact that the vials of insulin, the murder weapon in Hall's case, had gone missing from the fridge that morning when Hall was killed, he responded by saying: "obviously if someone was to kill someone, they wouldn't leave their signature would they? To say that they were there." He denied ever injecting Hall with insulin. The police were dismissive of Norris's claim that an intruder must have come in during the night shift through the fire escape while nurses were having a cigarette before injecting Hall. Norris said this despite revealing he had never once seen an intruder on the ward. Detectives believed this suggestion that an intruder had sneaked onto a bay at night to inject a patient before sneaking away without anybody realising (since no other staff member could have been responsible) was highly implausible.

Norris behaved bizarrely in the interviews he had with the police. Throughout the interviews he acted notably aggressively and arrogantly, challenging detectives, and became physically angry at times to the point where he had to be restrained. Investigators stated that Norris did not seem to be explicitly denying the murders, but insisting that they could not be proved, demanding officers told him how he did it and saying that he didn't think their facts were "good enough" to prove he had killed them. Criminologist Jane Monkton-Smith said it was particularly unusual that Norris didn't behave as if he wanted to defend himself in interviews, but instead challenged the police and acted evasively. Norris later admitted that he was trying to show how much more he knew than the police in interviews. In 2004, during the investigation, he walked into the offices of the Yorkshire Evening Post and declared that the police had "nothing on him" to reporters.

Chief superintendent on the case Chris Gregg claimed that Norris's prediction of Hall's illness showed that it wasn't just a spontaneous incident where a criminal nurse at work had, for whatever reason decided to kill someone, saying "he actually premeditated this, hours before". Gregg said: "I think he was cocky; I think he was over-confident. He was showing off". A criminal psychologist stated that, despite Norris's prediction, it was unlikely that he wanted to get caught, rather that he merely wanted to demonstrate a sense of superior knowledge. Police noted that, in interviews, Norris showed no empathy for the women who had died or for their families, and claimed he couldn't remember any of the women.

== Trial ==
Norris, recorded as being of Egilsay Terrace, Glasgow, went to trial in 2007 at Newcastle Crown Court. Norris's father did not object to the decision to charge his son, whom he described as "scum". At trial Norris denied ever having predicted Hall's death, despite having admitted this in police interviews. He admitted giving Vera Wilby and Doris Ludlam overdoses of morphine on 17 May and 25 June 2002 respectively (police had found these injections recorded by him in the hospital records). He had given Ludlam twice the allowed dose of morphine. It was highlighted that, when police first interviewed him, Norris had not mentioned the cases of Ludlam, Bourke and Crookes when he was asked if he had ever had experience of patients falling into hypoglycaemic comas, even though that is what they had experienced when Norris was on duty. Police said they believed this was done on purpose so he didn't arouse suspicion about those cases at that stage, since they had not yet been uncovered by investigators. It was also brought to the jury's attention that documents had been found at Norris's home detailing a less painful way of injecting morphine. Norris claimed, despite the blood test evidence, that none of the patients had been injected and if they were then an 'intruder' must have done it (since records showed no other staff member could have been responsible). This is despite the fact that the insulin fridge, where the drug had apparently been taken from, had a coded access and only medical staff could access it.

The length and complexity of the trial meant that judge Mr Justice Griffith Williams took five days to read out his 571-page summing-up. The jury retired on 27 February 2008 and deliberated for a further five days.

Norris was convicted by an 11-1 majority verdict on 3 March 2008 for the murder of four women, and the attempted murder of a fifth (Vera Wilby, aged 90). He was sentenced the following day to life imprisonment, and ordered to serve a minimum term of 30 years in prison. Norris had acted particularly aggressively throughout the trial, banging on the windows of the judge and attacking members of the press when departing the court, shoving two against a wall. Pictures of these attacks were not shown on television for fear of influencing the jury. The judge told Norris when sentencing:

"You are, I have absolutely no doubt, a thoroughly evil and dangerous man. You are an arrogant and manipulative man with a real dislike of elderly patients. The most telling evidence was that observation of one of your patients, Bridget Tarpey, who said 'he did not like us old women'. My view is you did not like them because they required too much nursing and were too demanding of your time. You are in my judgment essentially lazy as evidenced by your absences from student placements and work."

Norris's mother June Morrison said he had made her so proud as he grew to be successful in his chosen profession.

Referred to in the British press as the "Angel of Death", Norris was convicted of killing his victims by injecting them with high levels of insulin. The four victims were:

- Doris Ludlam, died 27 June 2002.
- Bridget Bourke, died 22 July 2002.
- Irene Crooks, died 20 October 2002.
- Ethel Hall, died 11 December 2002.

All of these victims had been killed in Norris's first year of working as a nurse. Hall was a mother of one and a grandmother of two. Ludlam was a mother of two, a grandmother and great-grandmother who had worked as a nursery school teacher and fostered children for the charity Barnardo's. Wilby was a vulnerable widow. Crooks died on her 79th birthday, unable to ever open her cards or presents. Hall's son Stuart expressed his relief at Norris's conviction, stating: "I think he needs to be kept inside". He added: "He has got the knowledge to kill people and to do it discreetly. That makes him a danger to society and he must be kept inside. We hope Colin Norris never leaves prison and can never harm anyone else again."

After the verdict was announced, Leeds Teaching Hospitals NHS Trust apologised to the victims' families for Norris's "disturbing" crimes, subsequently describing him as an "extremely dangerous criminal". In 2009, the Nursing and Midwifery Council struck off Norris from the medical register, taking just five minutes to come to a decision on the matter. Norris was imprisoned at HM Prison Frankland.

== Other suspected victims ==
After the trial, Chris Gregg revealed that he and the other detectives believed Norris had been responsible for up to six other deaths at the hospitals. He was the only nurse on duty when three other suspicious deaths occurred, but police felt there was not enough evidence to pursue convictions for them. Norris had also been arrested for another death of a patient, but the Crown Prosecution Service decided not to charge him in this case because of "complicating factors". In two other suspicious cases, the fact that there had been no post-mortem examinations prevented enough evidence being accumulated to charge Norris for their deaths.

== Motive ==
Norris grew up very close to Ruchill Hospital, where the infamous Jessie McTavish incident occurred in the 1970s

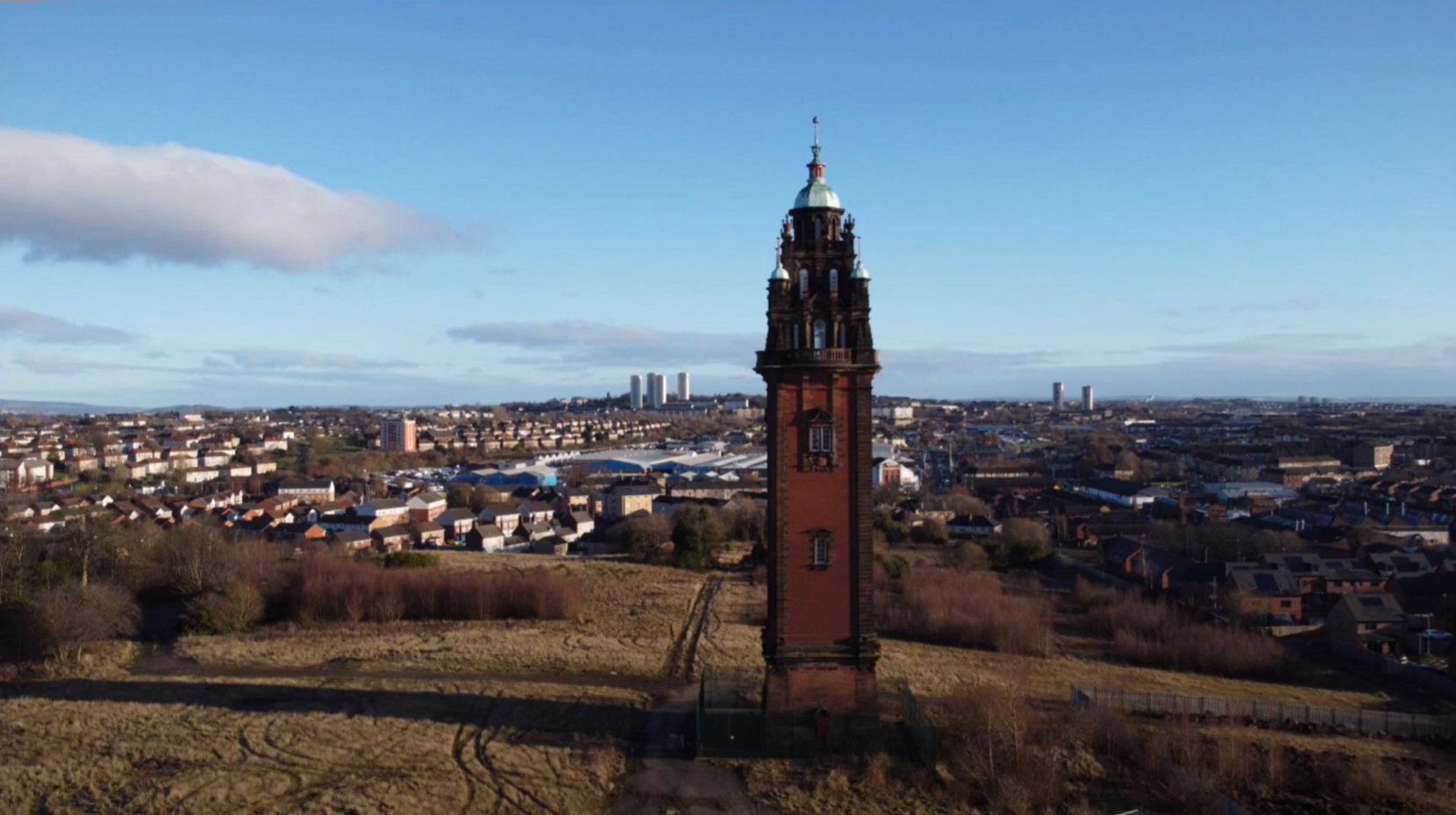
The site of the former Ruchill Hospital in Glasgow in 2021 (today only the water tower remains), which is where the Jessie McTavish incident infamously occurred. Norris lived in Milton on the left of the image.

Jessie McTavish, a nurse convicted and then controversially cleared of the 1974 murder of an 80-year-old patient with insulin, has been identified as the likely inspiration for Norris. She had worked at Ruchill Hospital in Glasgow, less than a mile from where Norris grew up. She had been released on appeal after her defence team successfully argued that the trial judge had inadvertently misled the jury in his final summing up, even though the appeal court judges said that it was something a "few words could have cured" and that there was enough evidence to support the prosecution. Norris's personal tutor at university gave a specific talk to him and other students on her case on 11 January 2001, a year before Norris committed his first attack, in which Norris used the same method as McTavish had been accused of using. Norris was tasked with "reviewing" her conduct, and in doing so, he would have learned that insulin is the perfect weapon for murder because it leaves the blood very quickly. Just like Norris, McTavish had 'predicted' the exact time when a healthy patient would die. She was able to continue her career in nursing after she was released on appeal. Norris had notably also attended lectures in 1999 on diabetes and the treatment of diabetic patients with insulin, where he learned about the consequences of blood sugars being too high or too low.

Forensic psychiatrist Richard Badcock, the only psychiatrist to formally assess the serial killer doctor Harold Shipman, stated his belief that Norris was a psychopath, who killed elderly patients simply because they got in his way. Just like Norris, Shipman's motive was not immediately clear. Chris Gregg said that he believed that Norris decided to poison the women simply because he found elderly patients irritating. Psychologist and senior lecturer at Manchester Metropolitan University David Holmes concluded that Norris was searching for a sense of power, since a medical staff member like him "administers literally life and death to affirm their own status or self-appointed status". Criminologist David Wilson commented on the case of Norris and other recently convicted serial killers by saying: "What's happening at the moment is that new groups are emerging as being vulnerable to attack".

=== Dislike of elderly ===
As a trainee nurse Norris often refused to work with elderly patients, saying he "didn't want to be working with that type of person". He admitted to police he found elderly patients challenging.

Police would later discover that Norris had repeatedly mistreated elderly patients in the early months of his nursing career at the same Leeds hospitals in which he would later go on to murder patients. In one instance, an elderly man asked Norris to empty his catheter bag, only for Norris to flatly refuse and insist he do it himself, before going off duty. The elderly man then collapsed after trying to reach the bathroom by himself. Other patients stated that Norris had treated them in an offhand and callous manner, and that Norris had an apparent dislike of old people. Two elderly ex-patients said that Norris had verbally abused them after they rang an emergency buzzer on a ward when an elderly patient climbed out of bed, with Norris then saying to them "I hope you suffer" and "rot in hell".

== Aftermath ==
=== Inquiry ===
In 2010, an independent inquiry into Norris's murders was held. The inquiry recommended the introduction of 'student practice passports', which would report on the personality and integrity of students while they trained as medical professionals at university. It was felt that this may have flagged up Norris as an issue earlier had they been in use at the time of his studying, since he had knowingly acted aggressively during placements, had a poor absence record and had clashed with tutors on numerous occasions. These 'passports', it was argued, would allow universities to evaluate at the end of a student's course whether the individual was fit to join the medical register. The inquiry found that the University of Dundee had not identified Norris's difficulties in its reference to employers, and the inquiry concluded that organisational, systems and cultural factors provided an opportunity for Norris to murder the four women in 2002. Nurse managers had already been urged after Norris's conviction in 2008 to take greater care when recruiting staff, and NHS employers had introduced new guidance on pre-employment checks.

=== Claims of innocence ===
Norris appealed against his conviction in 2009. Originally, Norris planned to appeal on the grounds that the trial judge had shown a "lack of balance", but then scrapped these plans and sacked his legal team. He subsequently appealed on the grounds that the judge had "misdirected" the jury in his final summary but he lost this appeal, with judge Lord Justice Aikens ruling the convictions were "safe" and saying that the case against Norris was "very strong indeed". The appeal court rejected both grounds of the appeal, saying that the judge's directions "cannot validly be criticised" and that there was no misdirection to the jury. The appeal court instead said that the judge's summary in the original case was an exemplary "tour de force". The judges also refused to believe that the deaths were "coincidental". Norris's defence team had argued that the deaths could have been the result of 'naturally' raised insulin levels caused by severe spontaneous hypoglycaemia, but the judges rejected this possibility.

On 4 October 2011, the BBC reported that retired Professor Vincent Marks – a leading expert on insulin poisoning – was concerned about Norris's conviction. He had been asked by the Norris family to find evidence in the case. He claimed the jury at Norris's trial was wrongly led to believe by experts that a cluster of hypoglycaemic episodes, among people who were not diabetic, was sinister. After carrying out his own studies, he said: "Looking at all the evidence, all I can say is I think Colin Norris's conviction is unsafe". He claimed that his own studies had shown that up to 1 in 10 of hypoglycaemia episodes in elderly people were caused naturally.

Marks said the four patients picked out by the experts after Mrs Hall's death "were all at very high risk of developing spontaneous hypoglycaemia" because they had risk factors such as malnutrition, infection and multi-organ failure.

In 2011 Louise Shorter, the former producer of BBC's Rough Justice, and journalist Mark Daly produced the documentary A Jury in the Dark, arguing that there were logical, non-criminal explanations for all the deaths. They and Marks claimed that Ethel Hall's hypoglycaemic arrest could have been caused naturally by 'auto-immune syndrome'. The possibility of auto-immune syndrome having caused the women's arrests had also already been considered and rejected at the trial. During research for the film, Daly discovered an additional death at Leeds General Infirmary which police had initially been investigating as a potential murder carried out by a male nurse, however; the death "went from suspicious to non-suspicious", when police learned that Norris was not on duty at the time. Norris's mother has tried to prove her son innocent, saying: "Either I am the mother of Scotland's worst serial killer or mother to the victim of the country's most terrible miscarriage of justice". After watching the BBC programme the sister-in-law of victim Bridget Bourke said that she was still convinced of Norris's guilt.

In May 2013 the Criminal Cases Review Commission confirmed it was re-examining the Norris case in the light of new medical and scientific evidence contradictory to that submitted to the jury during the original trial. However, in 2014, the son of victim Vera Wilby, John Barrie Wilby, said that he was "sad and upset" about the claims that Norris may be innocent, and said that he was still convinced of his guilt. In the same year there was outrage amongst elderly residents when a benefit concert was held for Norris in Dundee, with a spokesperson of the Dundee Pensioners' Forum stating: "Having a party for someone convicted of murdering all these elderly, vulnerable people is disgraceful. It's a slap in the face doing it, with all those families still grieving their loved ones". The Times declared he was one of "the 11 most evil staff in the NHS". In January 2015 the foreman of the jury that convicted Norris, after being shown the evidence in the BBC programme, said that he now believes him to be innocent; apparently the second member of the jury to do so (although this would still leave enough jury members to convict him, 10). He said that "the evidence shows a murder wasn't committed at all" (although in 2021 the CCRC concluded that Hall's case at least was indeed a clear murder).

==== 2021 CCRC referral to Court of Appeal ====
The Criminal Case Review Commission was given scientific information that the test which had established that Ethel Hall's blood was full of insulin was inaccurate, and that it was therefore not possible for her to have been murdered by an overdose of insulin. In 2021, the Criminal Case Review Commission discounted this claim when they said that there was "no dispute" that Hall was "murdered by the injection of insulin". The CCRC considered that Norris' conviction for Hall's murder relies on support from the other four convictions and the Crown's claim that no one else apart from Norris was responsible. The commission was "satisfied" that the claim that Norris was solely responsible is "less secure" with the new expert evidence.

In February 2021 the CCRC stated that after a "detailed review of this complex and difficult case" they had decided to refer the case to the Court of Appeal. It was said there was a serious possibility that the conviction was unsafe. As to Ethel Hall, the CCRC said that "there is no dispute that she was murdered by the injection of insulin". The experts who advised the CCRC said that it was not possible for a natural hypoglycaemic episode to have caused Hall's death, but could not exclude it being a possibility in the other four cases. Norris's defence team stated that Hall's case was a case of natural death, as with the others. The CCRC said that, in reaching the decision, they had been "greatly assisted" by the evidence of the experts employed by Norris's defence team.

Following the referral, the Court of Appeal began to re-examine Norris' case in May 2025. The renewed appeal was described as being of interest to lawyers acting for Lucy Letby due to her case involving similar concerns about the reliability of insulin testing and expert evidence, though the Court of Appeal would later give an oblique warning against drawing such parallels when handing down its judgement. Norris was represented during the fourteen-day hearing by Michael Mansfield KC. The court reserved judgement on 6 June 2025 and then rejected Norris' appeal on 26 June, holding that there was "no doubt" about his conviction. Norris' lawyers subsequently attempted to have an unspecified point of law certified by the Supreme Court, but the required permission was denied by the Court of Appeal in September 2025.

== In popular culture ==
In 2008, Norris's case was the focus of an ITV Real Crime documentary. In 2014, Norris was the subject of the BBC Panorama documentary "The Innocent Serial Killer?". In 2026, Louise Shorter, who in 2011 produced the BBC TV documentary A Jury in the Dark, produced the investigative radio series Killer On The Ward as part of BBC Scotland's Disclosure Investigates series.

== See also ==
- List of serial killers in the United Kingdom
