= Brownlee Centre =

Brownlee Centre may refer to:

- The Brownlee Centre for Infectious and Communicable Diseases at Gartnavel General Hospital in Glasgow
- The University of Leeds' sports facilities at the Brownlee Centre and Bodington cycle circuit.
