= Gartnavel Hospital =

Gartnavel Hospital may refer to two neighbouring institutions in Glasgow, Scotland:

- Gartnavel General Hospital, a teaching hospital
- Gartnavel Royal Hospital, a psychiatric hospital
