= City of Glasgow Fever and Smallpox Hospitals =

Former hospital network in Glasgow, Scotland

City of Glasgow Fever and Smallpox Hospitals (Belvidere), Glasgow, Scotland were established in 1870 and closed in 1999.

== Background ==
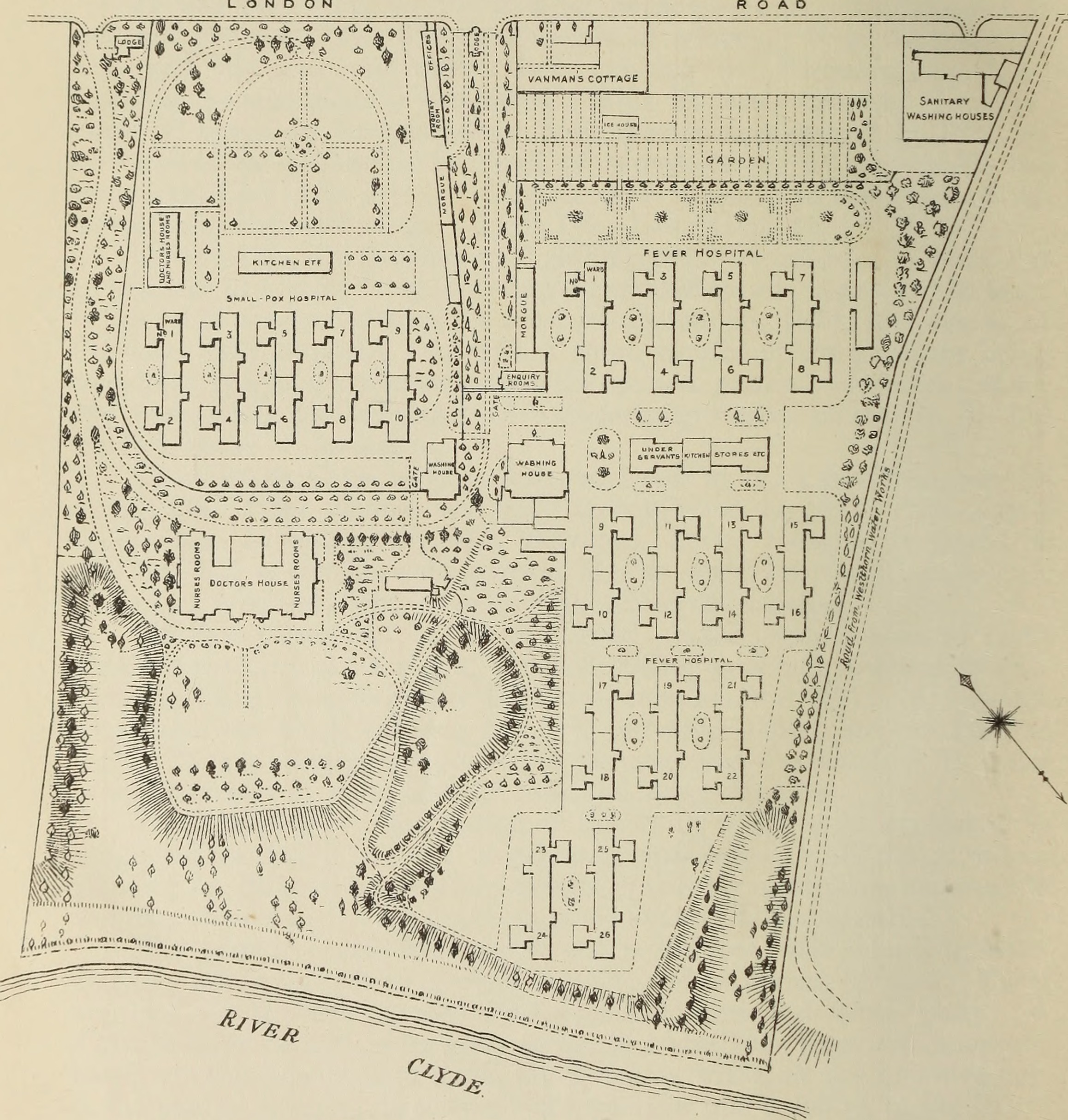
Plan of the hospital dated 1901

The first fever hospital in Glasgow opened in 1865 on Kennedy Street (Townhead) during an epidemic of typhus. It was expected to be temporary and had capacity for 136 patients. In 1869 a typhus epidemic required an extension of the Parliamentary Road Hospital to 250 beds. The following year a relapsing fever epidemic resulted in a lack of accommodation for patients. Further capacity for infectious diseases was required; Belvidere Estate, a 33-acre site based on the grounds of Belvidere House just north of the River Clyde and south of London Road near Dalmarnock and Parkhead, was purchased for £17,000 to be made into both a smallpox and fever hospital. Given the urgency of requiring accommodation initially temporary wooden pavilions were built, with first 'temporary shed' occupied on 19 December 1870. The smallpox hospital at Belvidere was formally opened on 5 December 1877, and had 150 beds.

The Belvidere remained primarily an infectious diseases hospital until after the creation of the National Health Service in 1948. In 1954 a respiratory medicine unit opened. In 1957 a new polio unit was installed costing £30,000. In 1962 there was the addition of a maternity unit. It later became a general geriatric hospital until the closure of the hospital in 1999.

The site remained derelict until most of the buildings were demolished for housing in 2006. Following negotiations, the remaining administration block and nurses' house (which was Category B listed) was also demolished in 2014 and now virtually no trace of the hospital remains.

== Hospital reports ==
The annual report of 1902 of the City of Glasgow Fever and Smallpox Hospitals, Belvidere, showed that 4,435 patients were admitted in comparison to 4,932 the year before. In the early part of the year a considerable number of patients suffering from plague as well as a number for observation under suspicion of that disease were admitted. During the year 1,730 cases of smallpox were admitted, the highest number of cases in one year in hospital in Glasgow. The mortality rates was 11.9% (538 deaths) mostly due to smallpox. The last case of plague in Glasgow was in 1911.

== Medical staff ==
When Belvidere opened the medical staff were Dr James Burn Russell, Dr James Allen and Dr William McEwen. Throughout his career McEwen insisted on an educated nursing staff. Dr John Brownlee also held the position of Physician Superintendent. Dr Thomas Archibald was in charge of Belvidere between 1914 and 1951.

== Matrons ==
In 1875 Mrs Amelia Sinclair came to Belvidere to take up the position of Matron. When she arrived she was a widow, aged 44 years, and worked at the hospital until her 76th year. Her husband had died on their honeymoon in Arran. She was not a qualified nurse but was very highly regarded as a matron. In 1906 Sinclair, following over 30 years service, announced her retirement due to her advancing years. She died in March 1921, age 90 years. She is buried in Sandymount Cemetery along with other nurses and staff from Belvidere. Sinclair is credited with securing the higher education of fever nurses as well as their physical well-being.

In 1906 Miss Aitken was appointed Matron. She trained at the Western Infirmary, was previously a sister as Wolverhampton Fever Hospital and superintendent of the Bradford Nurses’ Institution. She was the daughter of Dr J Aitken from Govan.

In 1915 Miss A.D. Lindsay was recommended by the Health Committee of the Glasgow Parish Council to succeed the late Miss Aitken as Matron. She remained Matron for 17 years, retiring in 1932. Lindsay undertook her fever training certificate at Belvidere and her general training at the Western Infirmary, Glasgow. She was assistant matron at Belvidere, matron at Knightswood Hospital, Glasgow before returning to Belvidere when appointed matron.

In 1932 Miss Jane Cairns Campbell, SRN, became matron of Belvidere. Campbell trained at Knightswood Fever Hospital and the Glasgow Royal Infirmary. She was a first assistant matron at Belvidere and matron at Shieldhall hospital, Glasgow. She was a member of the College of Nursing. Campbell was matron for 14 years and died in 1946.

In 1946 Miss MF Greig RGN, RFN, was appointed matron at Belvidere. She trained at Manchester Royal Infirmary. She worked as a sister, junior assistant matron, and senior assistant matron at Ruchill Hospital, Glasgow.

== Fever nursing ==
In 1912 a training and certification scheme for fever nurses was introduced. This included training in anatomy and physiology, hygiene and dietetics, medical and surgical and fever nursing for probationers for five hours of per week for seven months. The Local Government Board conducted examinations and issued certificates.

Between 1894 and 1909 29 nursing staff died with 17 of them being due to enteric fever. The death of a probationer nurse, Elizabeth Tippetts Forbes, was noted in 1923. She was 23 years old and died after three days illness. She was from Thurso, Caithness.

After the outbreak of plague in 1900 all nurses who worked at Belvidere received a gold medal.
