= Jessie McTavish =

Scottish nurse

Jessie Gordon, formerly McTavish, (born c.1940) is a Scottish retired nurse who was convicted in 1974 of murdering a patient with insulin, and of administering a variety of substances with intent to cause harm. The conviction was overturned on appeal in 1976. She was dubbed the "Angel of Death" by the press.

== Career ==
McTavish worked in Ward 5 at Glasgow's Ruchill Hospital.

== Prosecution ==
McTavish was tried in 1974 for the murder of an 80-year-old patient, Elizabeth Lyon and assaulting three other patients by giving them illegal injections. One victim was found after tests to have an inexplicable quantity of pethidine in their system, while the murder victim had been injected with soluble insulin. Colleagues of McTavish told the court how they had witnessed her inject a patient with an entirely unnecessary dose of phenobarbitone and then make no record of the injection, and that she had said at the time, "Doctor likes them to go quietly." Multiple doctors testified that McTavish often gave patients injections without recording these events in the patients' case notes.

Despite the blood test evidence, McTavish claimed during the 15-day trial that she had only injected the patient with a placebo of sterile water. However, McTavish had admitted in police interviews that she had administered insulin to patients without authorisation.

McTavish was jailed for life in October 1974. An appeal in February 1975 was successful. Three appeals court judges said that while there was ample evidence to support the conviction, the McTavish's legal team's successful argument—that the judge, Lord Robertson, had inadvertently misled the jury—would prevail. The appeals judges said Lord Robertson had failed to highlight the fact that McTavish denied admitting to the police that she had committed a mercy killing, an omission that "a few words could have cured."

Apart from the case prosecuted, another 23 deaths were deemed suspicious by investigators.

== Motive ==
The prosecution said that McTavish had been inspired by an episode of the detective series A Man Called Ironside, in which a character said that insulin was untraceable as a murder weapon and proceeded to murder a person using this method. McTavish had notably discussed with colleagues how the programme had taught her that soluble insulin would be an untraceable agent for homicide.

== Aftermath ==
In 1976, McTavish married, becoming Jessie Gordon.

In 1984, she was restored to the professional register for nursing, midwifery and health visiting. She continued her career in nursing.

== Influence ==
Although acquitted, McTavish's case often is mentioned in lectures at medical colleges in Britain and is cited in textbooks and academic papers about forensic science and medical malpractice. Colin Norris, a nurse convicted of four murders and an attempted murder in 2008, is said to have been inspired partly by McTavish's case. He murdered his patients with insulin. Norris, a fellow Scottish nurse, grew up only a mile away from Ruchill where McTavish worked. Her case was discussed extensively in lectures at Dundee University when Norris studied there.

== See also ==
- List of miscarriage of justice cases in the United Kingdom
- Lucy Letby
