= St James's University Hospital =

Hospital in West Yorkshire, England

- The Leeds Teaching Hospitals NHS Trust
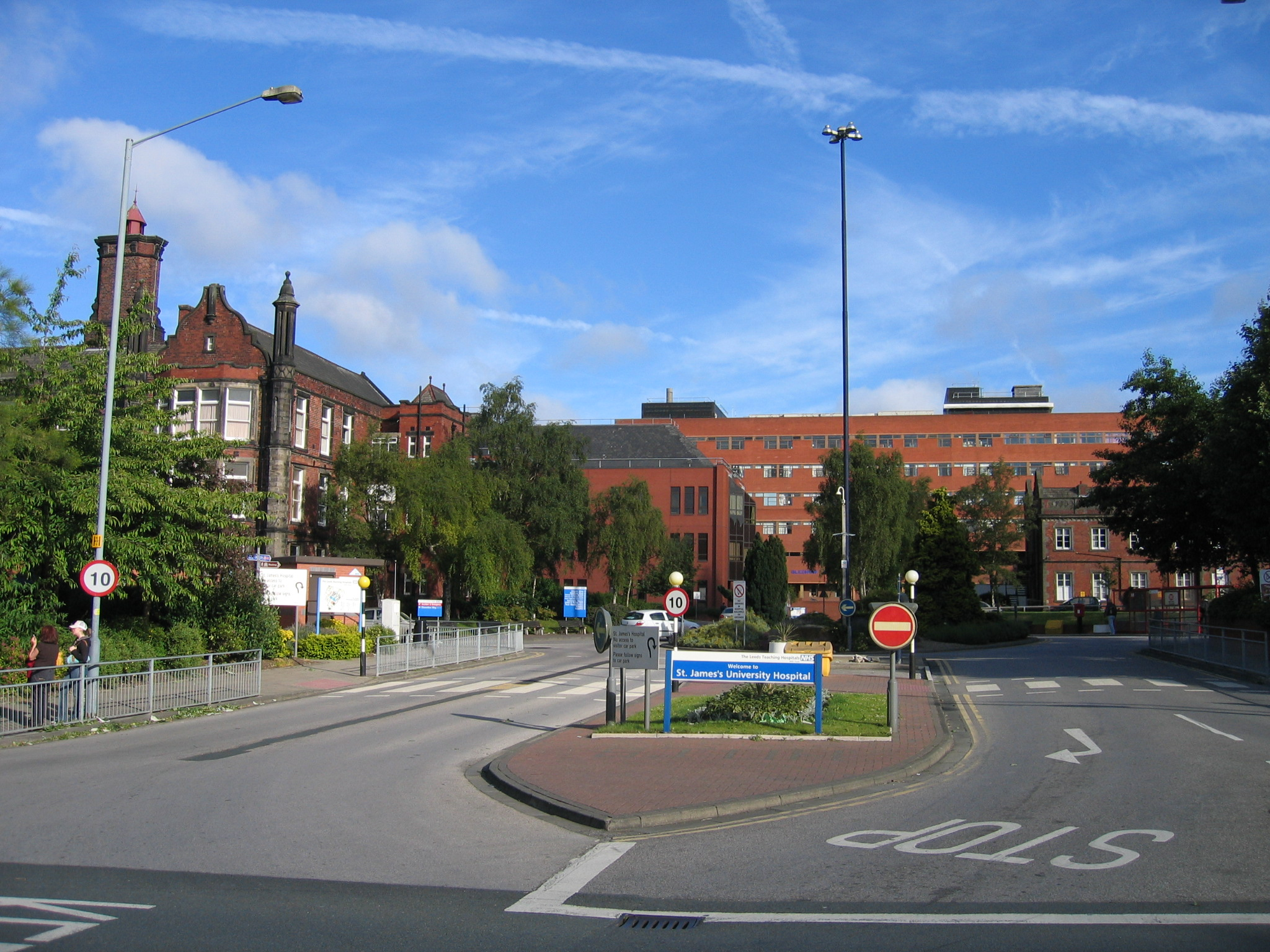
- Main Entrance (Gledhow Wing ahead, Lincoln wing on the left)

- Shown in West Yorkshire

Geography
- Location: Beckett Street, Leeds, West Yorkshire, England
- Coordinates: 53°48′29″N 1°31′7″W

Organisation
- Care system: NHS
- Type: Teaching
- Affiliated university: University of Leeds

Services
- Emergency department: Yes - Adults
- Beds: 1,157

History
- Founded: 1925 replacing the Poor Law Infirmary which had its origin in 1848

Links
- Website: www.leedsth.nhs.uk
- Lists: Hospitals in England

St James's University Hospital is a tertiary hospital in Leeds, West Yorkshire, England and is popularly known as Jimmy's. It is the 8th largest hospital by beds in the United Kingdom, popularised for its television coverage from 1987 to 1996. It is managed by the Leeds Teaching Hospitals NHS Trust.

The hospital is home to the Leeds Cancer Centre which provides specialist Oncology services to Leeds and the wider West Yorkshire region. Other specialist services based at St James's include Hepatology, Pathology and the Cystic Fibrosis Unit.

== History ==
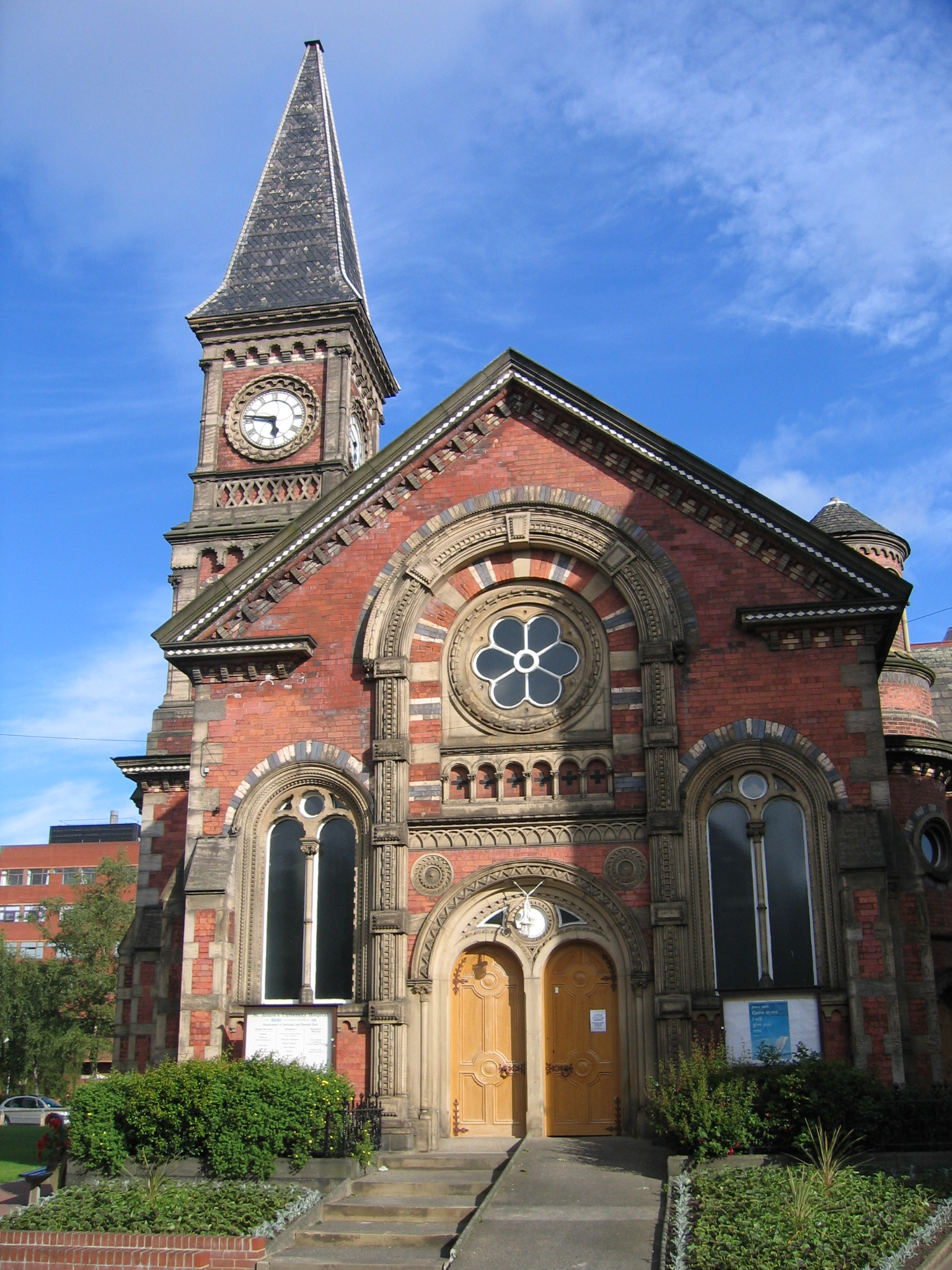
The Chapel

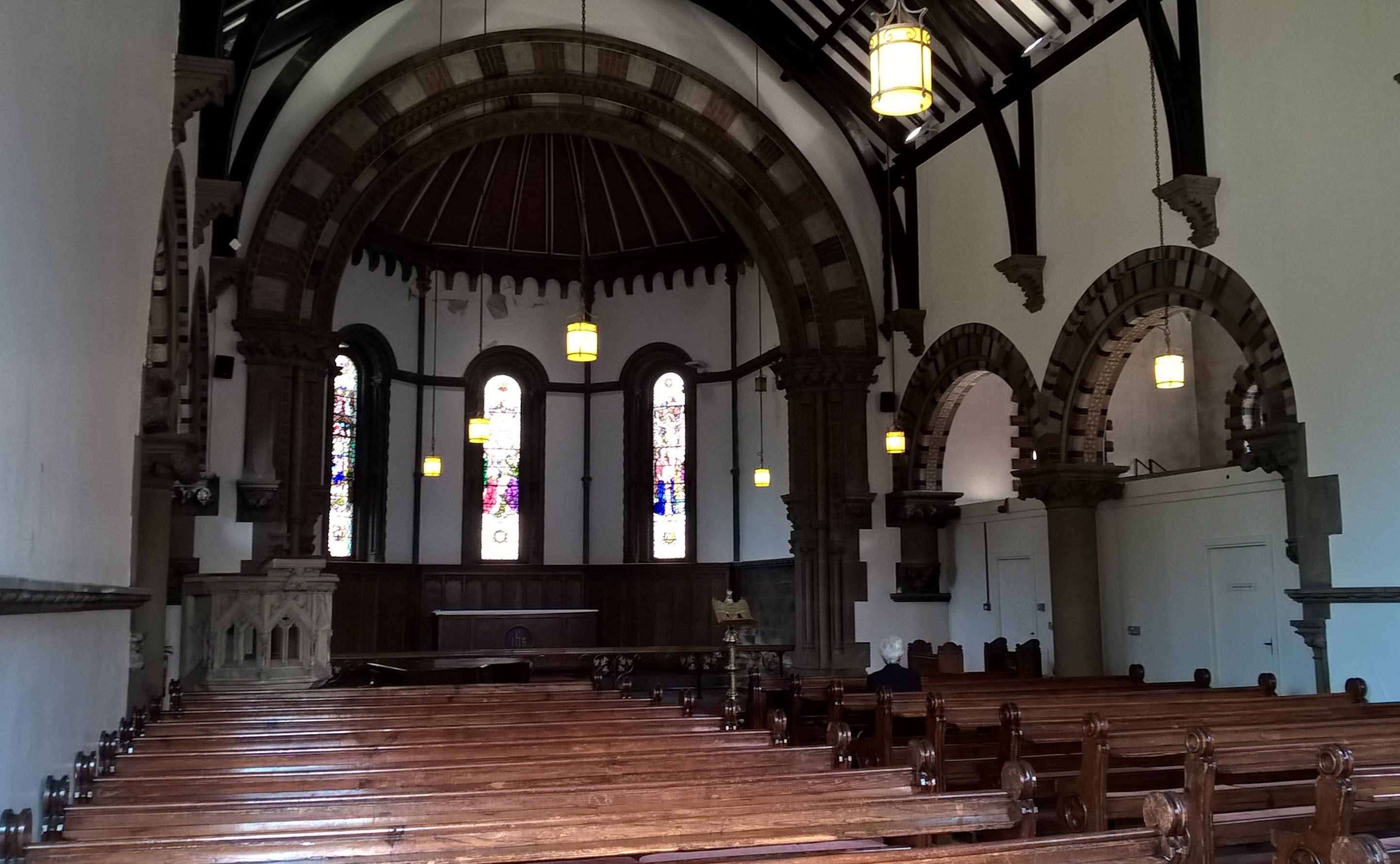
Chapel interior

The hospital has its origins in the Leeds Moral and Industrial Training School built in 1848 (which now forms part of the Lincoln Wing). Subsequent early developments included the Leeds Union Workhouse (which now houses the Thackray Museum of Medicine) built in 1858. The chapel, which is a Grade II listed building, was completed in 1861 by the firm of Perkin & Beckhouse, of Leeds, and the Leeds Union Infirmary (the site of the present Gledhow Wing) was built in 1874.

By the end of the 19th century, the facilities were largely used for medical care of the poor, rather than as a workhouse. During the First World War it was called the East Leeds War Hospital, caring for armed services personnel. From 1881 the Medical Superintendent of the Leeds Union Infirmary was Dr James Allan. On his retirement in 1925, the infirmary was renamed St James's Hospital, to honour him, and also Sir James Ford, of the Leeds Board of Guardians, who had overseen the conversion from workhouse to hospital.

The hospital expanded following the creation of the National Health Service in 1948 and the site was redeveloped during the 1960s. It was one of the hospitals investigated in 1967 as a result of the publication of Barbara Robb's book Sans Everything. Accusations were made against a State Enrolled Nurse including "assaults; the deliberate act of making an elderly female patient inebriated by means of brandy which had been issued to the ward; swearing at patients; mischievously and maliciously squirting spirit onto the bodies of elderly patients in order to give them shocks". There were also allegations of neglect and inefficiency, which were subsequently determined to have been unfounded.

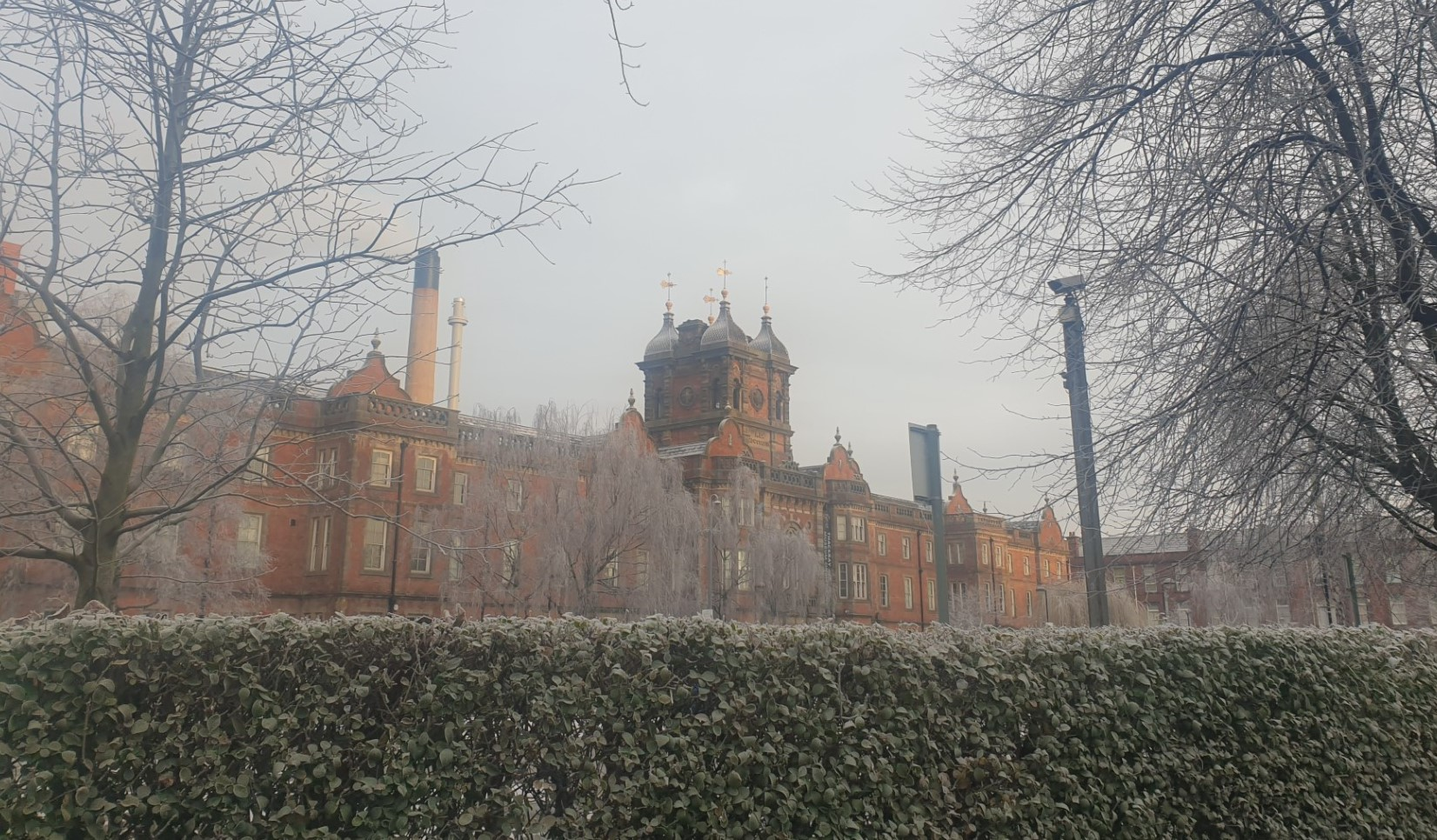
Leeds Union Workhouse, now Thackray Museum of Medicine

In 1970, following expansion of Leeds School of Medicine, it was renamed St James's University Hospital. The Chancellor's Wing, which included a new Accident and Emergency Department, was opened by the then Chancellor of the University of Leeds, the Duchess of Kent, in February 1972.

A new oncology building, the Bexley Wing, containing the St James's Institute of Oncology (including the Gamma Knife Centre) was procured under a Private Finance Initiative contract in 2004. It was designed by Anshen & Allen and built by Bovis Lend Lease at a cost of £265 million and accepted its first patients in December 2007. It was officially opened by the Princess Royal on 17 July 2008. The building is one of Europe's largest cancer centres, with 1,600 staff and 350 beds.

Since 2010, all Children's Services have been consolidated at the Leeds General Infirmary across the city, also managed by the Leeds Teaching Hospitals NHS Trust.

As part of Leeds Teaching Hospitals Hospitals of the Future program, the Centre for Laboratory Medicine (CfLM) opened in September 2023 at the hospital. It provides specialist pathology services for hospitals within the West Yorkshire Association of Acute Trusts (WYAAT).

== 2002 serial killer incident ==
In 2002, serial killer nurse Colin Norris, who worked on the orthopaedics ward of the hospital, killed two of his own patients in cold blood. He had been transferred to St James's from Leeds General Infirmary, where it later materialised he had already murdered two patients and attempted to kill another. He was caught after Dr Emma Ward ordered blood tests on victim Ethel Hall, who despite only having a broken hip had inexplicably fallen into a hypoglycaemic coma, with the tests revealing that she had been secretly injected with a huge amount of insulin. Norris's case was sent to the Court of Appeal in 2021.

== 2023 attempted bombing ==
On 20 January 2023, a student nurse by the name of Mohammad Farooq, aged 27, was arrested after leaving an explosive device outside the maternity ward of the hospital. A patient, Nathan Newby, was suspicious and, over the course of two hours, talked Farooq into surrendering to police. At the time of arrest, he was caught in possession of a Gediz 9mm PAK semi-automatic pistol. Prosecutors added that he was inspired by radical Islam, and that he carried out "hostile reconnaissance" of an RAF base on 10 and 18 January after carrying out online research and intended on carrying out a 'lone wolf' attack. He was charged with engaging in conduct with the intention of committing acts of terrorism between 12 July 2022 and 20 January 2023.

In October 2025, Newby was awarded the George Medal, the UK's second highest award for civilian bravery.

== Facilities ==
All of the hospital buildings except Chancellor's Wing, which was named after the Duchess of Kent, a former Chancellor of the University of Leeds, are named after surrounding streets in the Leeds suburb of Harehills:

- Beckett Wing – Care of the Elderly
- Bexley Wing – Oncology
- Gledhow Wing
- Lincoln Wing
- Chancellor's Wing

The hospital is one of six centres which conduct liver transplants. St James's was the location of the first living-related donor Liver transplantation on the NHS. The University of Leeds has a large presence at the St James's Hospital site with a new molecular medicine centre, the Wellcome Trust Brenner building. There is a notable cystic fibrosis unit in the Gledhow wing which offers specialist inpatient and outpatient services and research, and has its own method of management guidelines called the "Cystic Fibrosis Leeds method of management". The Thackray Museum of Medicine adjoins the hospital site and is located in the Grade II listed former main building of the Leeds Union Workhouse.

== Jimmy's TV series ==
St James's University Hospital's fame derives in part from its extensive television coverage in the documentary series also titled Jimmy's, produced by Yorkshire Television (YTV) between 1987 and 1996 for ITV.

== Main buildings ==
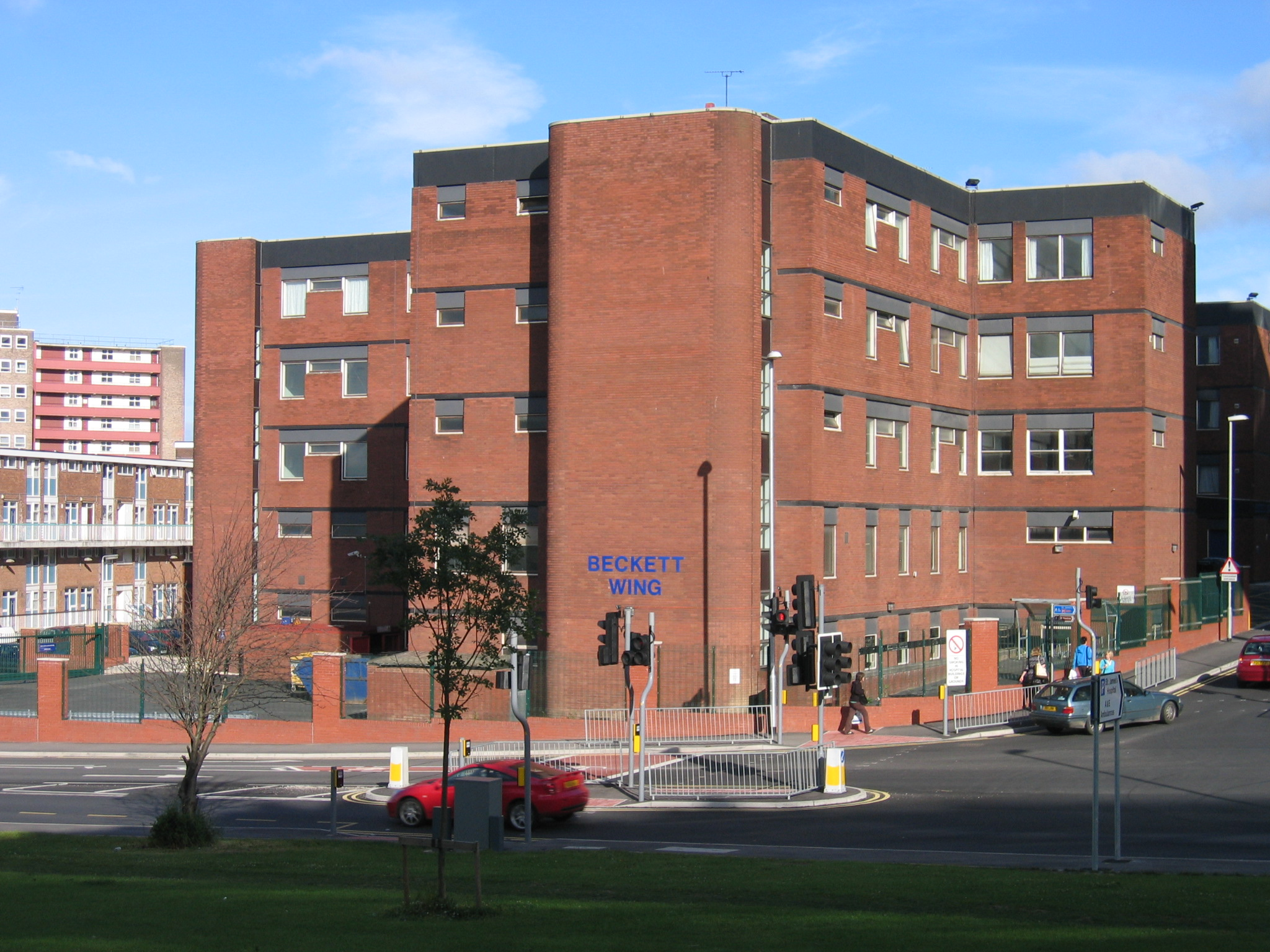
Beckett Wing

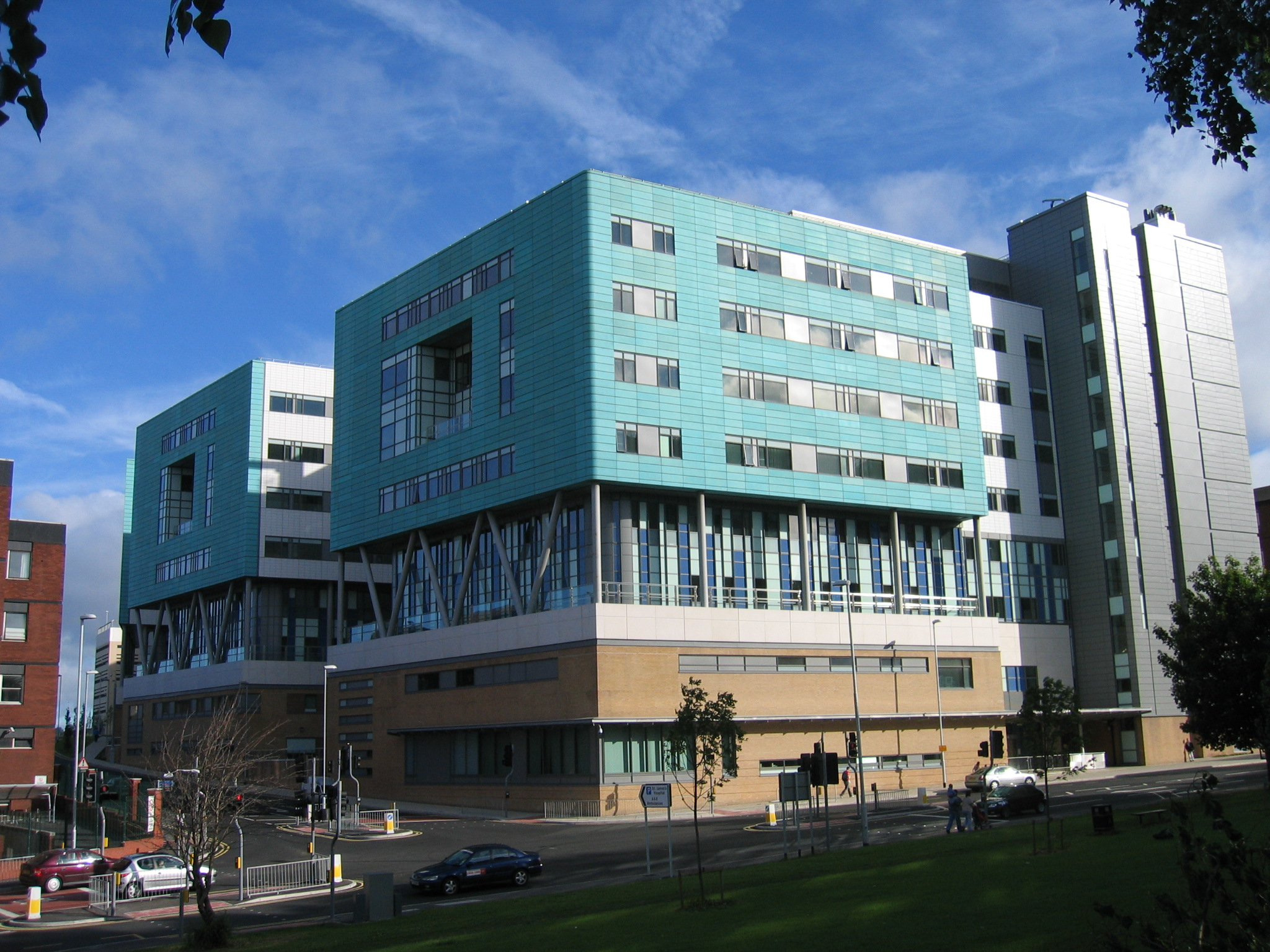
Leeds Cancer Centre Oncology (Bexley Wing)

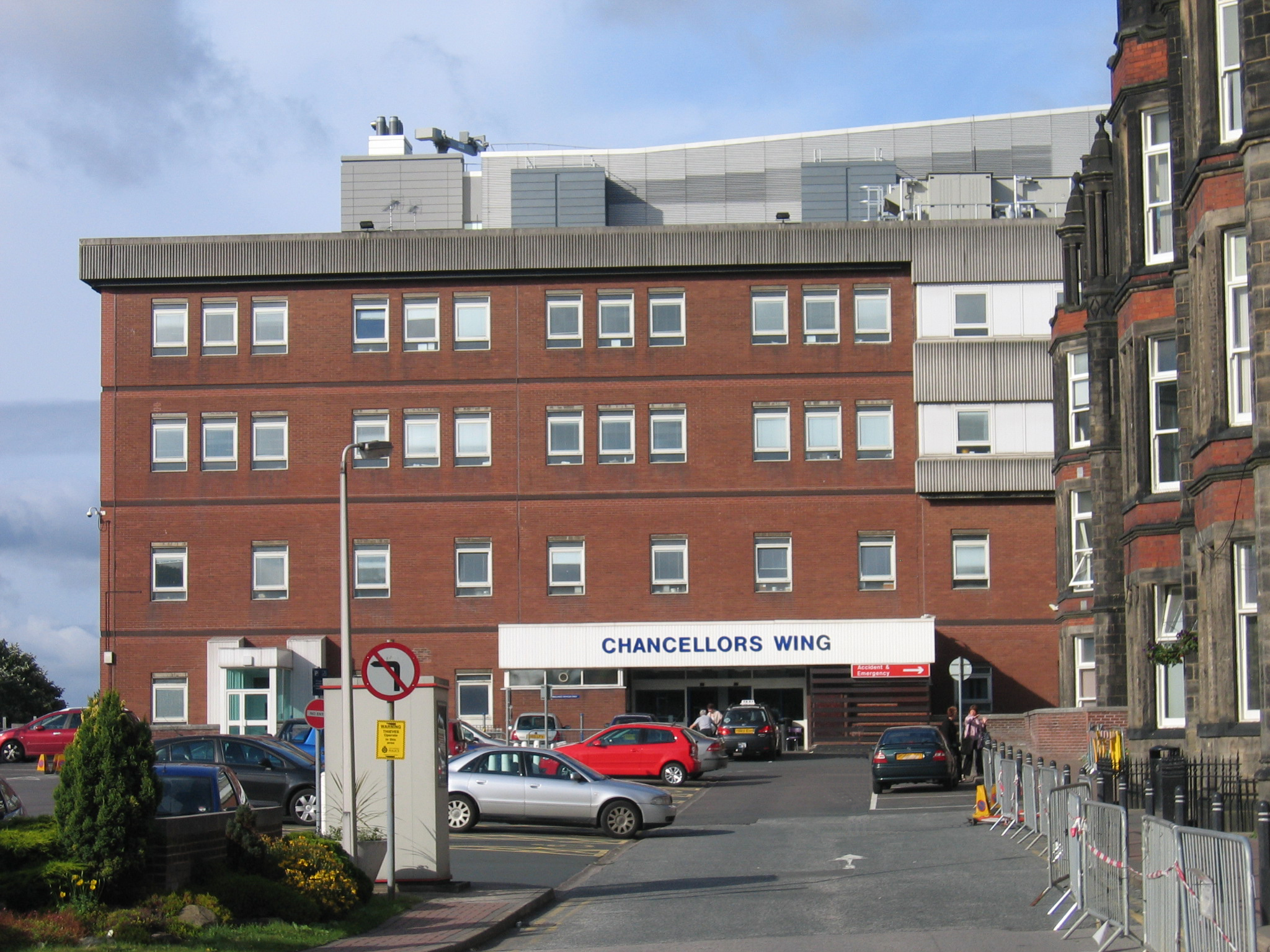
Chancellor's Wing

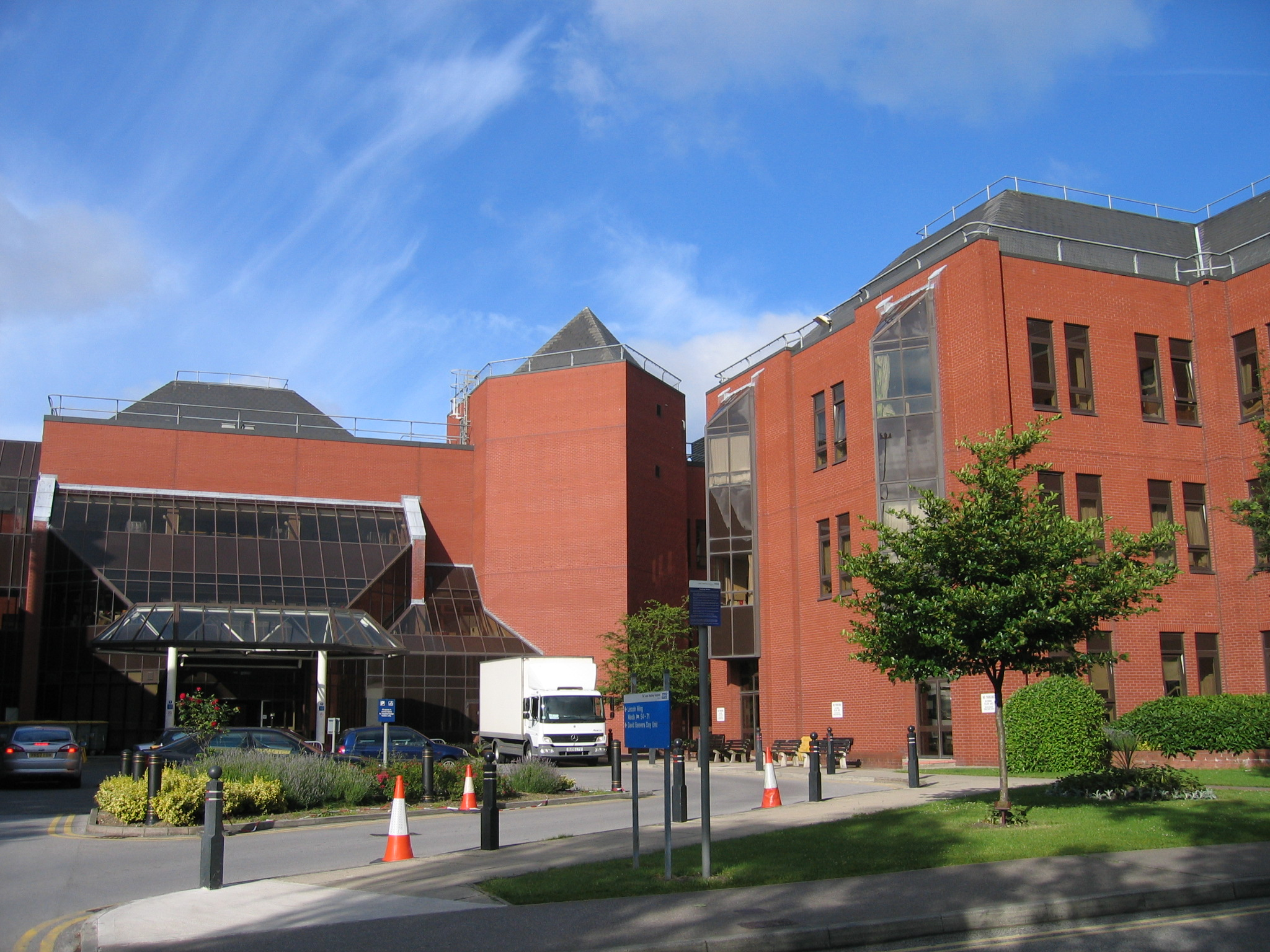
Lincoln Wing

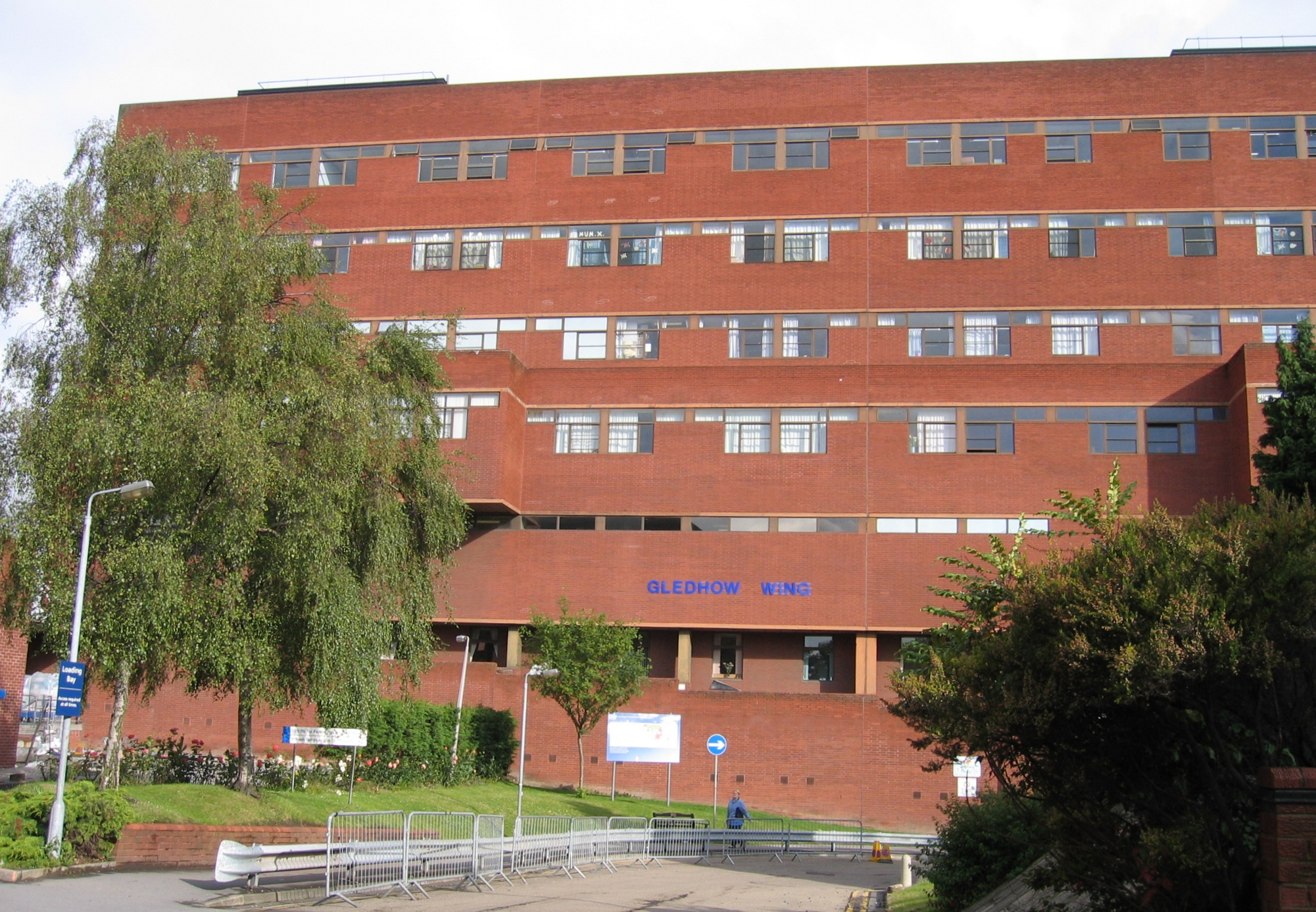
Gledhow Wing

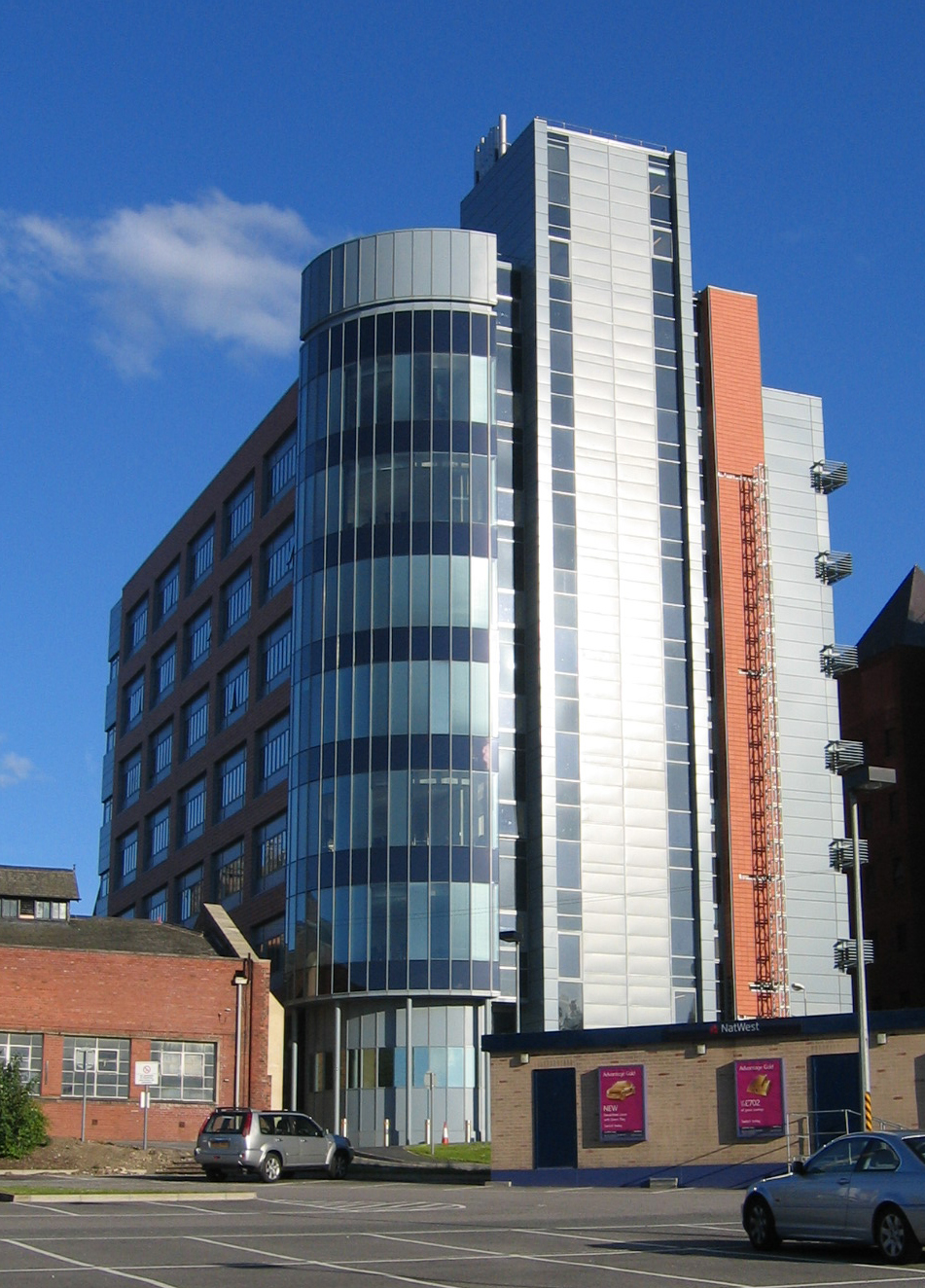
Wellcome Trust Brenner Building

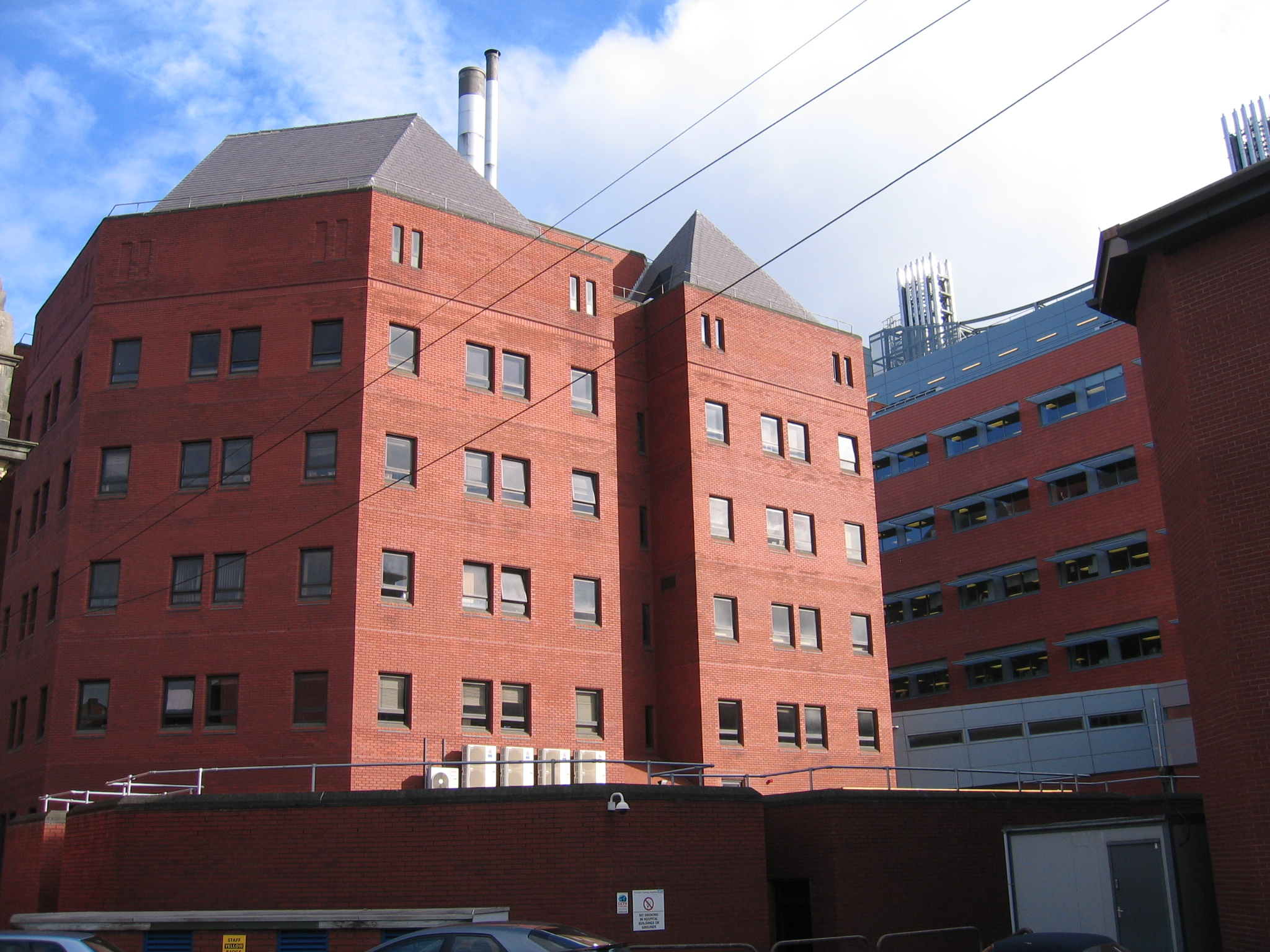
Clinical Sciences Building

== See also ==
- List of hospitals in England
- Listed buildings in Leeds (Gipton and Harehills Ward)
