= Leeds Gamma Knife Centre =

Medical facility in Leeds, West Yorkshire, England

Coordinates: 53.808°N 1.521°W

Leeds Gamma Knife Centre is based in the Institute of Oncology at St James's University Hospital in Leeds, West Yorkshire, England.

St. James's Institute of Oncology (Bexley Wing), a National Health Service (NHS) hospital, is the largest cancer research hospital in Europe. When the Leeds centre opened in March 2009, there were only four other centres in the UK which specialised in the treatment of brain disease by a Gamma Knife. It is home to the world's most advanced Gamma Knife – the £3m Leksell Perfexion, manufactured by Elekta. In January 2010 the centre hosted an international conference “Extending the Horizon: Advances in Gamma Knife Therapy” in which new treatment possibilities for the Gamma Knife came under the spotlight in the UK.

In 2011 Leeds Gamma Knife Centre began a relationship with Belfast Health and Social Care Trust to treat NHS and private patients from across all Ireland – ensuring continuity of care across the Irish Sea.

== See also ==
- Cancer in the United Kingdom
