= Gartnavel General Hospital =

Teaching hospital in Glasgow, Scotland

- NHS Greater Glasgow and Clyde
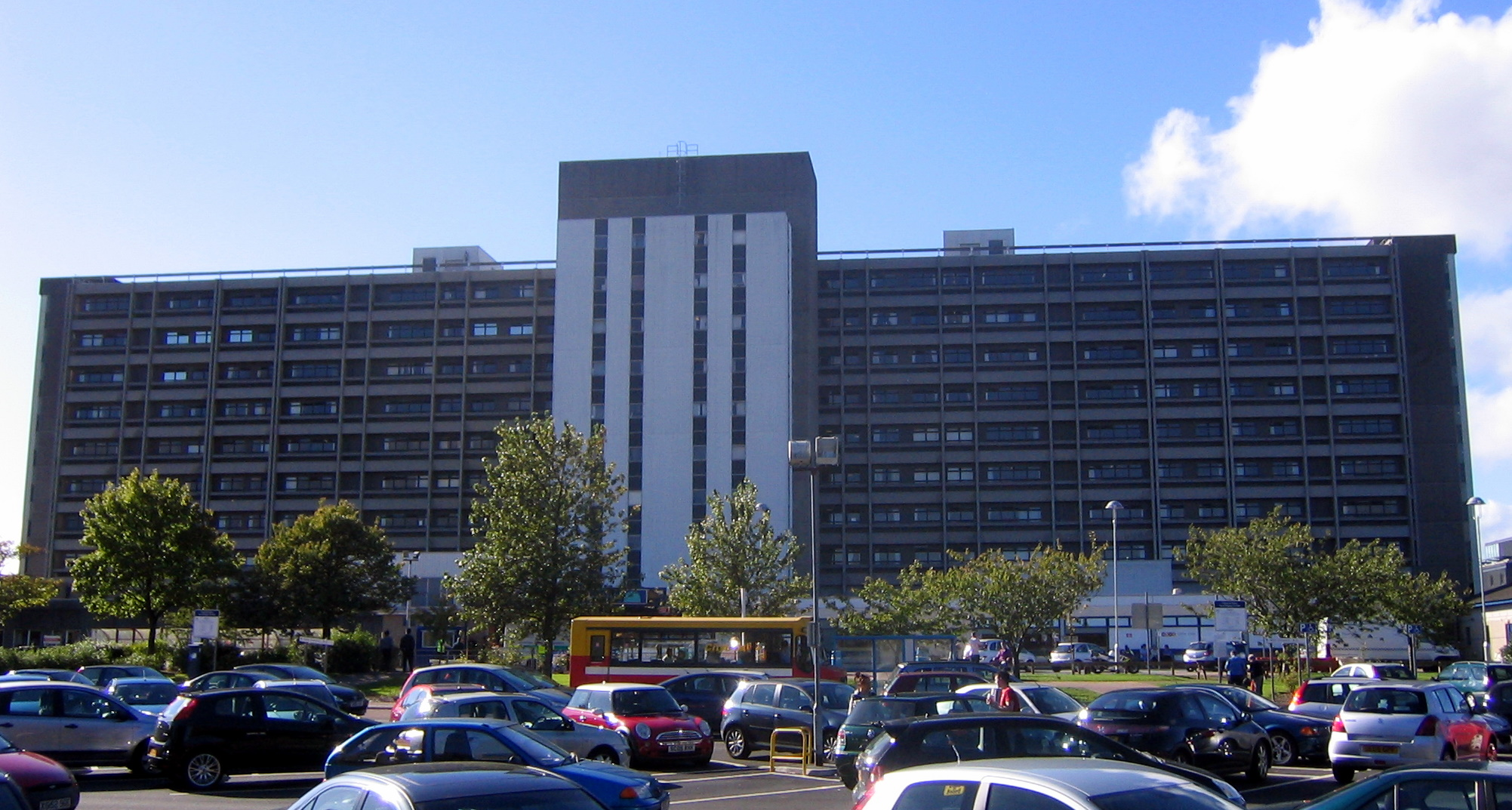
- Gartnavel General Hospital

- Shown in Glasgow

Geography
- Location: Great Western Road, Glasgow, Scotland
- Coordinates: 55.88292°N 4.31248°W

Organisation
- Care system: NHS Scotland
- Type: Teaching
- Affiliated university: University of Glasgow

Services
- Emergency department: No
- Beds: 668

History
- Founded: 1972

Links
- Website: Gartnavel General Hospital
- Lists: Hospitals in Scotland

Gartnavel General Hospital is a teaching hospital in the West End of Glasgow, Scotland. The hospital is located next to the Great Western Road, between Hyndland, Anniesland and Kelvindale. Hyndland railway station is adjacent to the hospital. The name Gartnavel is derived from the Gaelic Gart (field or enclosure) Ubhal (apple) – i.e. "a field of apple trees". It is managed by NHS Greater Glasgow and Clyde.

== History ==
In April 1965, the Western Regional Hospital Board announced a major building programme and the following year a £1 million contract was awarded for a new district general hospital to be sited beside the existing Gartnavel Royal Hospital. The hospital was designed by Keppie, Henderson & Partners in association with Thomas Astorga, It was initially used to house units from the Western Infirmary that were relocating while the hospital buildings were being demolished and replaced. The hospital was officially opened by Princess Alexandra in October 1973.

Originally a single eight-storey block containing 576 beds standing on a three-storey podium, further buildings have since been added, including a cancer care centre in 2007 to replace the Beatson Oncology Centre facilities that were spread between Gartnavel, the Western Infirmary and the Royal Infirmary.

== Brownlee Centre ==
The Brownlee Centre for Infectious and Communicable Diseases, named after the statistician, John Brownlee, opened on the Gartnavel General Hospital site in 1998, replacing services and research laboratories at the city's Ruchill Hospital. It is one of four laboratories in the UK on the WHO list of laboratories able to perform PCR for rapid diagnosis of influenza A (H1N1) virus infection in humans.

The Brownlee Centre was designated as the receiving centre for any potential Ebola virus disease cases during the 2014 Commonwealth Games.

On 29 December 2014, Pauline Cafferkey, a British aid worker who had just returned from Sierra Leone was diagnosed with Ebola virus disease at the centre. On 30 December 2014, she was transferred to the specialist Ebola treatment centre at the Royal Free Hospital in London for longer-term treatment.
