= Ruchill Hospital =

- NHS Greater Glasgow
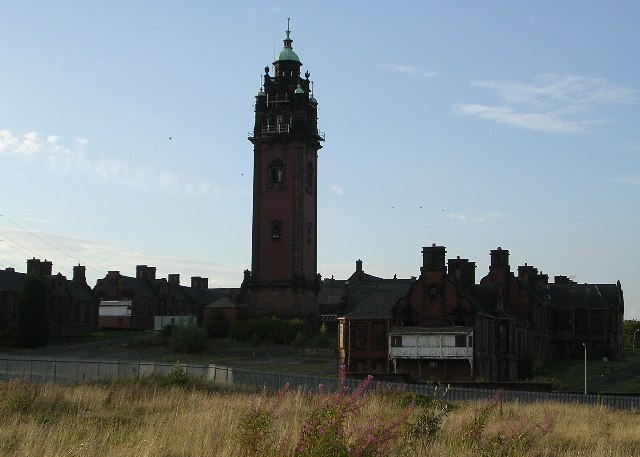
- The remaining derelict ward pavilions and water tower at Ruchill Hospital in 2005

- Shown in Glasgow

Geography
- Location: Glasgow, Scotland
- Coordinates: 55.8888°N 4.2640°W

Organisation
- Care system: NHS Scotland
- Type: Specialist

Services
- Beds: 1,000 (1948)
- Speciality: Infectious diseases

History
- Founded: 1900
- Closed: 1998

Links
- Lists: Hospitals in Scotland

Ruchill Hospital was a fever hospital in the Ruchill area of Glasgow, Scotland. The hospital operated from 1900 until its closure in 1998. It was later sold to Scottish Enterprise for redevelopment in July 1999. The hospital was commissioned and managed by the Glasgow Corporation from its opening in 1900 until the creation of the National Health Service in 1948, and thereafter by NHS Greater Glasgow.

== History ==
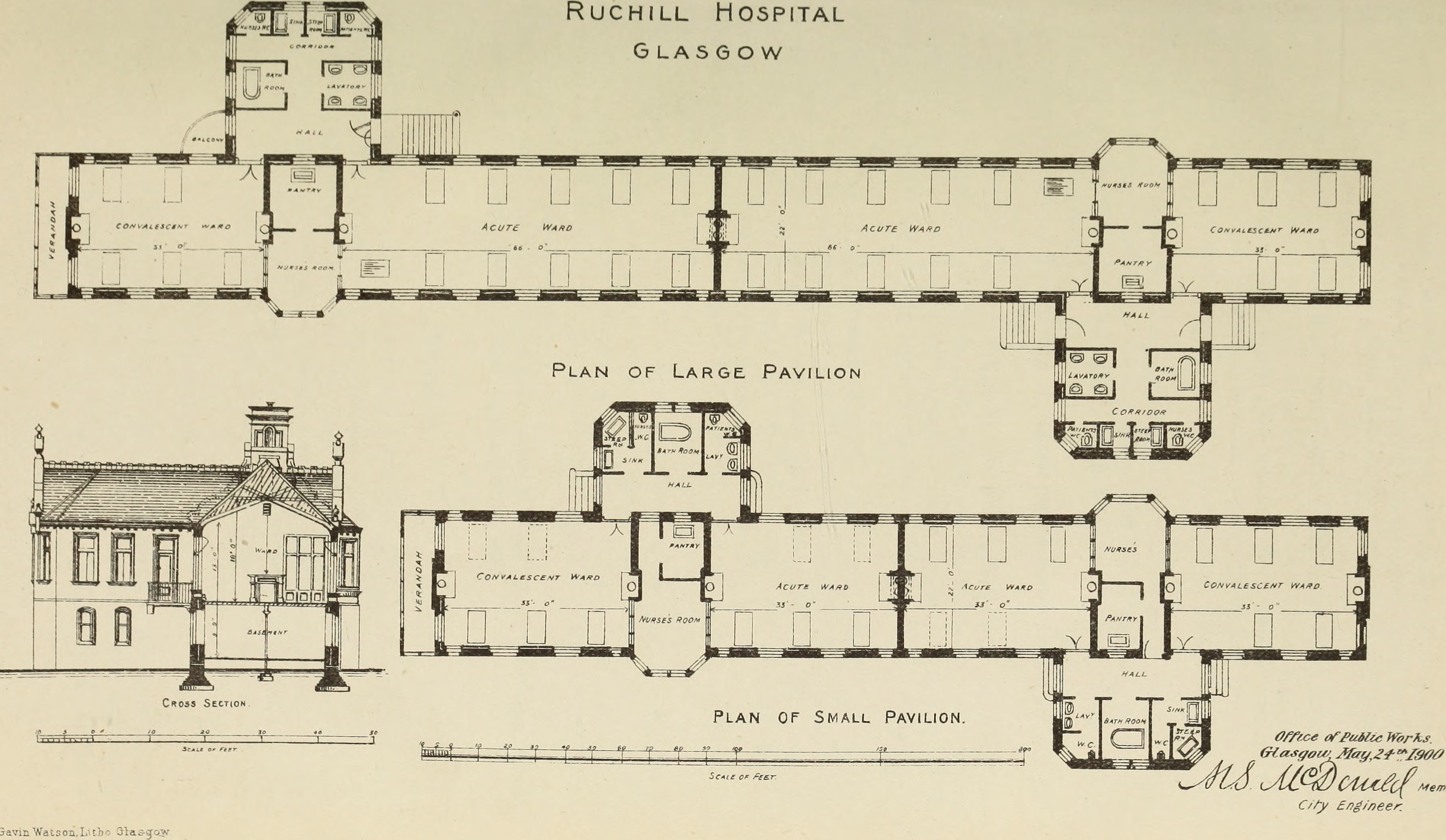
Plan of the original ward pavilions at Ruchill Hospital from the Glasgow Office of Public Works, 1900

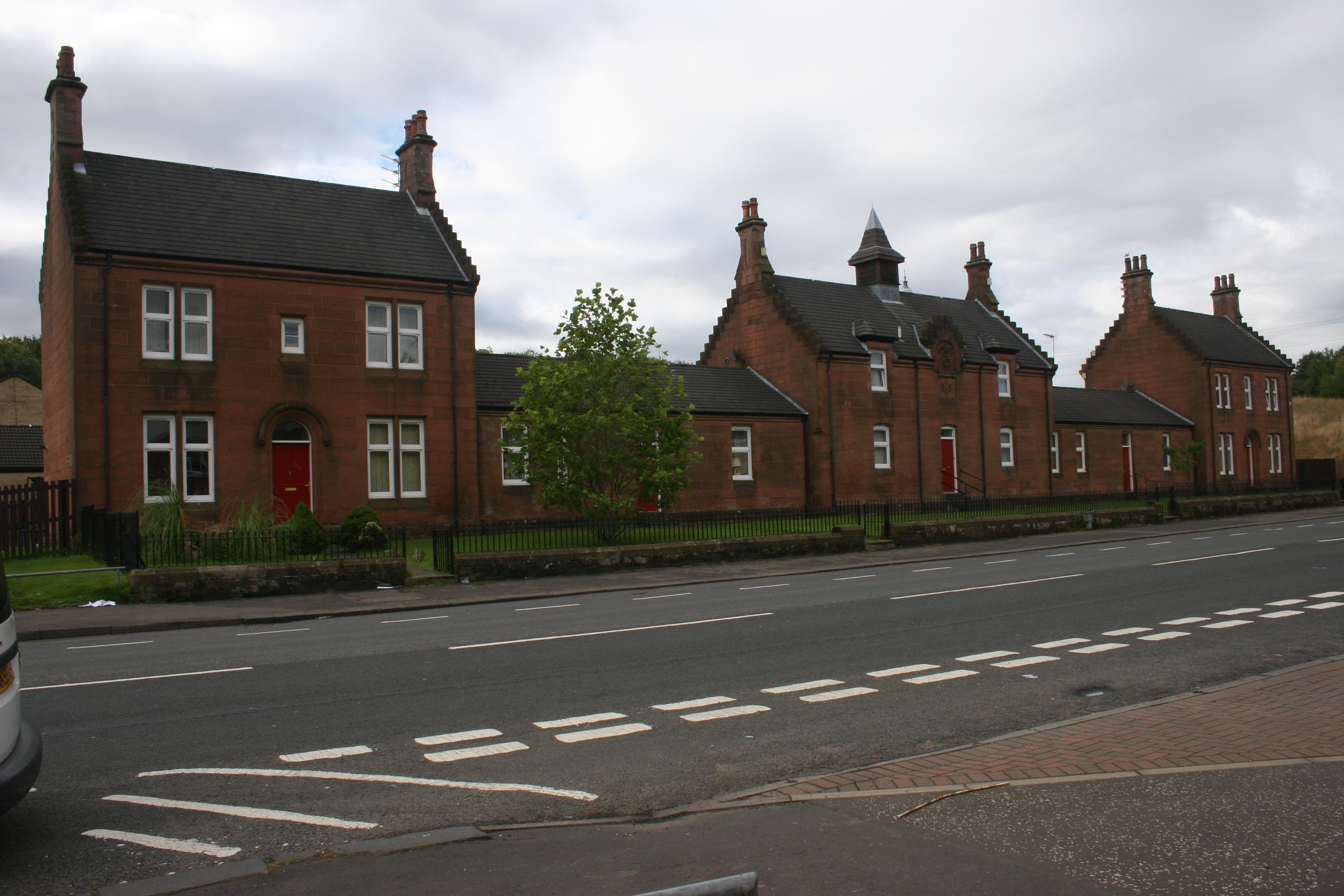
A sanitary washhouse and disinfection station was constructed on Bilsland Drive in 1893 and was later converted into social housing in 1992

In 1891 when the boundaries of Glasgow were extended to include Ruchill and Maryhill, the Glasgow Corporation purchased 53 acres (21 ha) of land there for a public park, golf course and 36 acres (15 ha) for the city's second fever hospital, to create the additional capacity beyond that already provided at Belvidere Hospital in Parkhead.

Ruchill Hospital was designed by the City Engineer, Alexander B. McDonald in a Neo Jacobean style, largely using red brick dressed with red sandstone ashlar. McDonald was responsible for a number of civic projects in the city from 1890 to 1914, the most notable being the People's Palace.

Work started on Ruchill Hospital on 16 April 1895, and the foundation stone was laid by Lady Bell, the wife of Sir James Bell, Lord Provost of Glasgow, on 29 August 1895. The hospital cost £250,000 and was designed to deal specifically with infectious diseases, such as tuberculosis, smallpox, diphtheria, scarlet fever, poliomyelitis and measles, which were widespread at the time. It was opened by Princess Christian on 13 June 1900.

It had an initial capacity of 440 beds, spread across sixteen isolated Nightingale ward pavilions, twelve of which were large, each containing beds for 30 patients, and four smaller ones accommodating 20 patients each. The only entrance was via a gatehouse on Bilsland Drive. Other buildings included a kitchen and stores block, an administration block, a clearing house (to direct patients to appropriate treatment locations), a mortuary and laboratory block, a stable block, a sanitary wash house and disinfecting station, a laundry and a three-storey nurses home as well as ten staff villas and semi-detached cottages along Bilsland Drive. The centrepiece however was its 165 ft (50 m) water tower, required due to the height of the site.

In the early 20th century, an additional 270 beds were provided with the construction of three ward pavilions and a tuberculosis pavilion.

By the time of its absorption into the National Health Service in 1948 Ruchill Hospital had 1,000 beds.

In 1951, Professor Thomas Anderson CBE established the Brownlee Laboratory at Ruchill as a centre for research into the epidemiology of respiratory infections, named after John Brownlee, the hospital's superintendent physician from 1908 to 1922, and the first Director of the Medical Research Council’s Statistical Department at Ruchill Hospital. The first nude mice were discovered by Dr. Norman R. Grist at the Brownlee Laboratory in 1962.

With the discovery of vaccinations for infectious diseases like polio and measles, as well as public health campaigns like Glasgow's X-Ray campaign against tuberculosis in 1957, the number of in-patients had reduced to 586 by 1975.

Jessie McTavish, a nurse, was convicted of murdering a patient with insulin at the hospital in 1974.

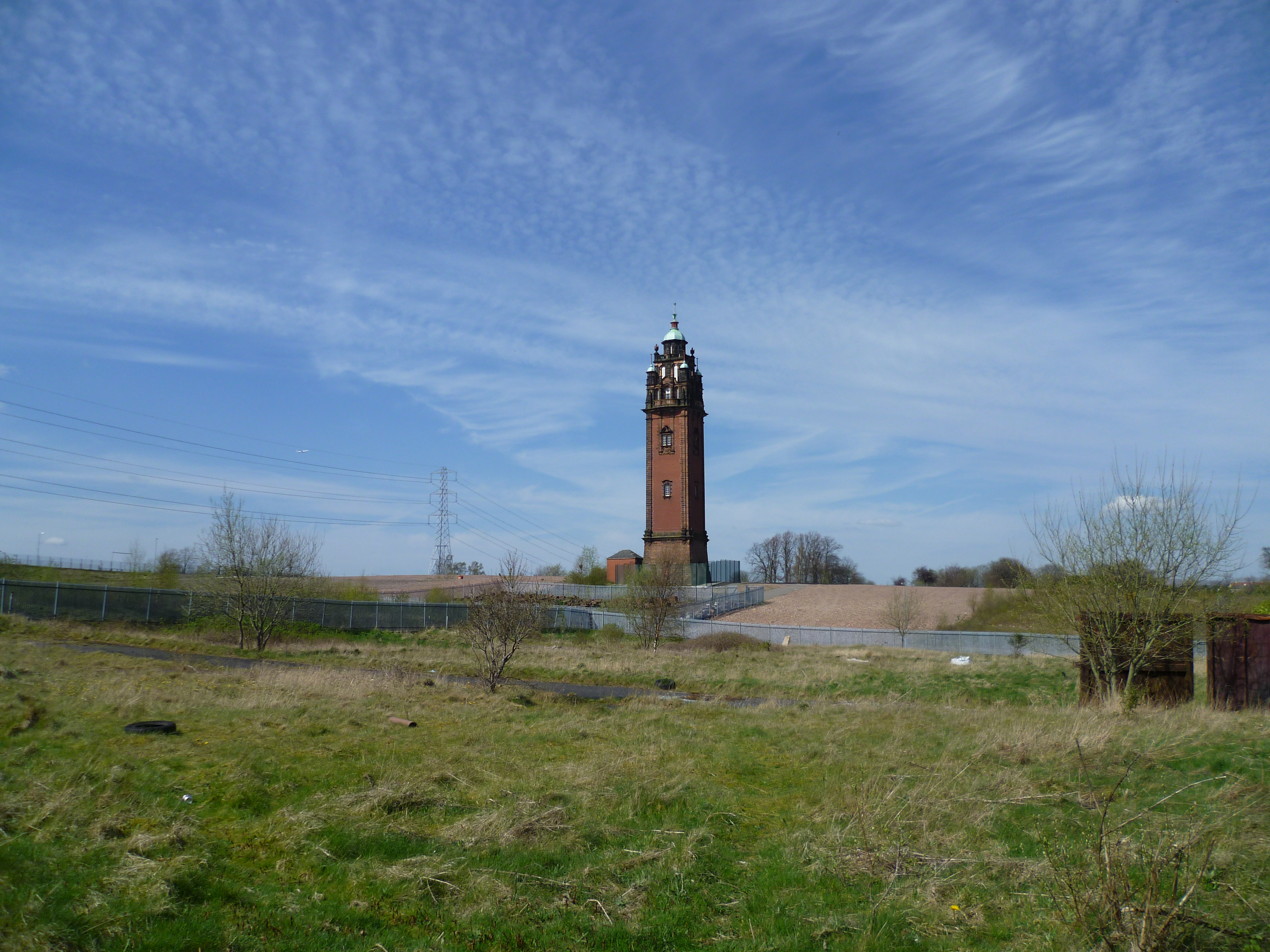
Ruchill Hospital site in 2014.

In addition to treating other sexually transmitted diseases, Ruchill Hospital was also designated the primary Glasgow hospital dealing with cases of HIV, the cause of AIDS, after the emergence of this virus in the early 1980s, and also took patients from elsewhere in the West of Scotland. The hospital opened HIV counselling clinics in 1986, Scotland's first needle exchange in 1987, and provided laboratory services related to HIV, as well as later operating the HAVEN, a drop-in centre for people with HIV run by AIDS support organisation PHACE West. In addition, the Scottish Centre for Infection and Environmental Health, or SCIEH, the progenitor of today's Health Protection Scotland was based at the hospital.

After the opening of the Brownlee Centre for Infectious and Communicable Diseases, named after the statistician, John Brownlee, at Gartnavel General Hospital, Ruchill Hospital closed in 1998.

The site was sold to Scottish Enterprise in July 1999. Plans were subsequently submitted by Scottish Enterprise in April 2010 to demolish all the remaining listed buildings, with the exception of the red-brick category A-listed water tower. This was rejected by Glasgow City Council's planning committee in April 2011. Scottish Enterprise appealed the decision and secured consent to proceed with the demolition in December 2012. Following the demolition of the other buildings, the hospital's red-brick water tower remains a particularly prominent local landmark.

In October 2020, Bellway submitted an application to Glasgow City Council for planning consent for a housing development at the former hospital; the proposal attracted objections from the former MP Paul Sweeney among others, on the basis that the style of the development was inappropriate in the context of the historic importance of the location. A revised plan for housing on the site was approved by the city's planning committee in October 2021, with a uniform red brick design code and incorporation of heritage elements from the former hospital, as well as reuse of the former water tower.
