= John Brownlee (statistician) =

John Brownlee (1868–1927) was a British physician and medical statistician who became the first director of the Statistics Department of the UK's Medical Research Committee.

== Life ==
The son of a Church of Scotland minister, he studied at the University of Glasgow, obtaining degrees first in mathematics and natural philosophy and then in medicine. He became in 1900 physician-superintendent to the City of Glasgow Fever Hospital and the new Ruchill Hospital from 1908. In 1914 he became the founding director of the statistics department of the UK Medical Research Committee and held the post until his sudden death from bronchopneumonia in 1927.

== Works ==
Brownlee was influenced by Karl Pearson's mathematical approach to statistics, and applied the Pearson family of distributions to epidemics. In the view of fellow epidemiologist and statistician Major Greenwood, Brownlee took these techniques further than any of his contemporaries. His studies included the epidemiology of phthisis and measles.
