= List of residential colleges =

Residential colleges are found at universities around the world. This list is sorted by country (and sometimes by regional subdivision), and by university.

There are various different definitions of what makes a residential college, including: "Residential colleges are collegia in the original sense: societies, not buildings, and their members may reside anywhere" (emphasis in original); "A residential college is a collegiate residential environment in which live-in faculty play an integral role in the programmatic experience and leadership of the community" (emphasis in original); and "A college is, at its heart, an association or community of people having a distinctive sense of common purpose: in the university context this common purpose is the pursuit of scholarship and understanding through education and research." Overall, residential colleges demonstrate a wide diversity in their natures. This list does not follow a particular definition but includes university residential institutions identified as colleges or residential colleges in reliable sources. It does not include academic colleges (faculties in British English) of universities, although it does include residential colleges (such as those at Oxford and Cambridge universities) that participate in academic teaching. It also does not include residential further education colleges, such as the Royal National College for the Blind, or other non-university residential colleges.

Due to the diversity of residential college systems, not all universities on this list are collegiate universities where all students are members of a residential college. Many universities run residential colleges alongside other forms of residential accommodation, at others residential colleges are only offered after the first year of undergraduate studies, or only in the first year. Post-graduate students are not always included in collegiate systems. In at least one instance, the collegiate system runs primarily within a single faculty of the university. Where this information is available, these differences are described in the list entries below.

== Australia ==
=== South Australia ===
==== Independent colleges in Adelaide ====
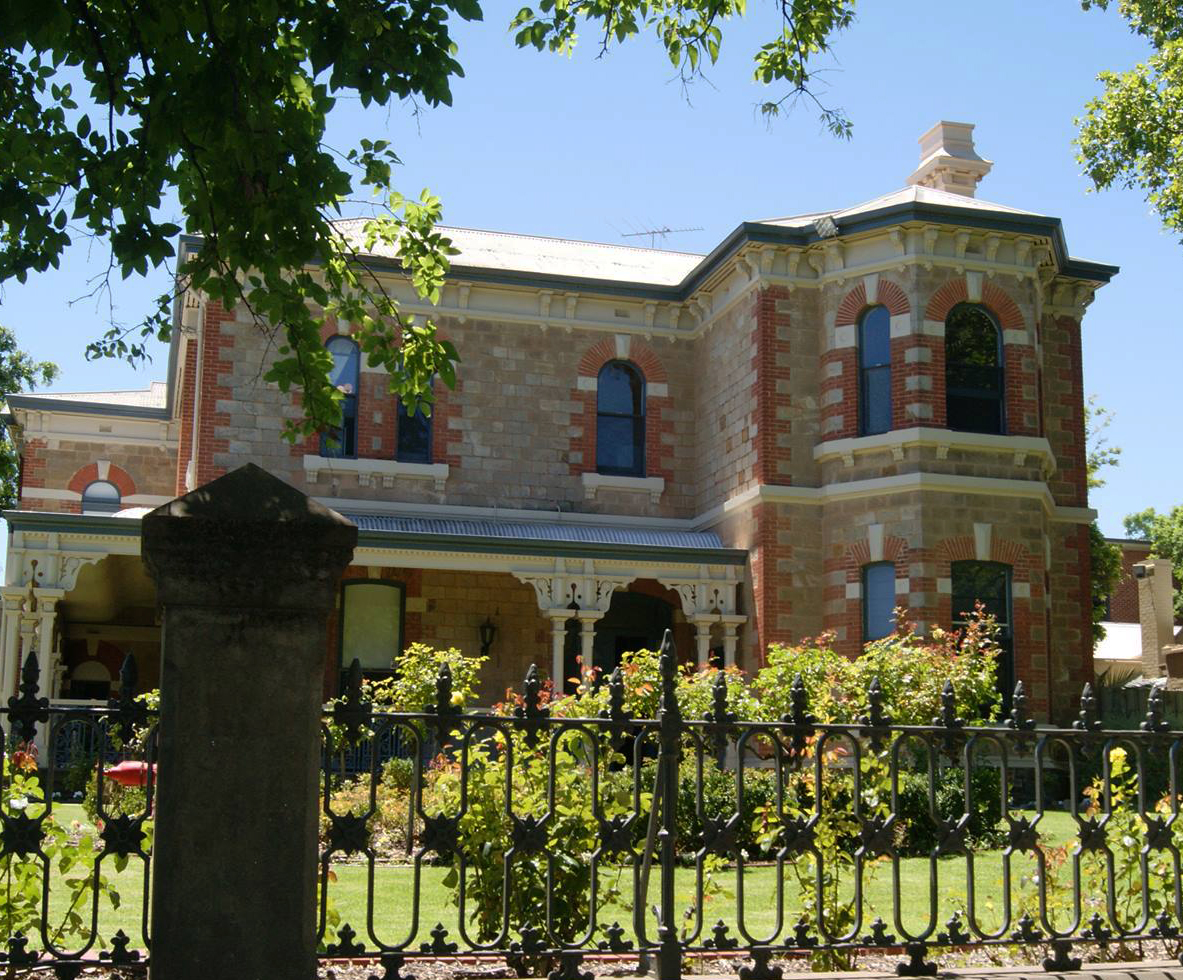
St Mark's College

There are four independent colleges in north Adelaide associated with the University of Adelaide, University of South Australia and Flinders University. The oldest, St. Mark's College, opened in 1925.

- Aquinas College
- Lincoln College
- St. Ann's College
- St. Mark's College

=== Australian Capital Territory ===
==== Australian National University ====
There are two independent residential colleges associated with the Australian National University:

- Burgmann College
- John XXIII College

=== Tasmania ===
==== University of Tasmania ====
There are four residential colleges at the University of Tasmania's Hobart campus. Christ College became the first residential college of the university in 1933.

- Christ College
- Jane Franklin Hall
- St. John Fisher College
- Hytten Hall

=== Victoria ===
==== La Trobe University ====
There are three colleges on La Trobe University's Melbourne campus:

- Chisholm College
- Glenn College
- Menzies College

==== University of Melbourne ====
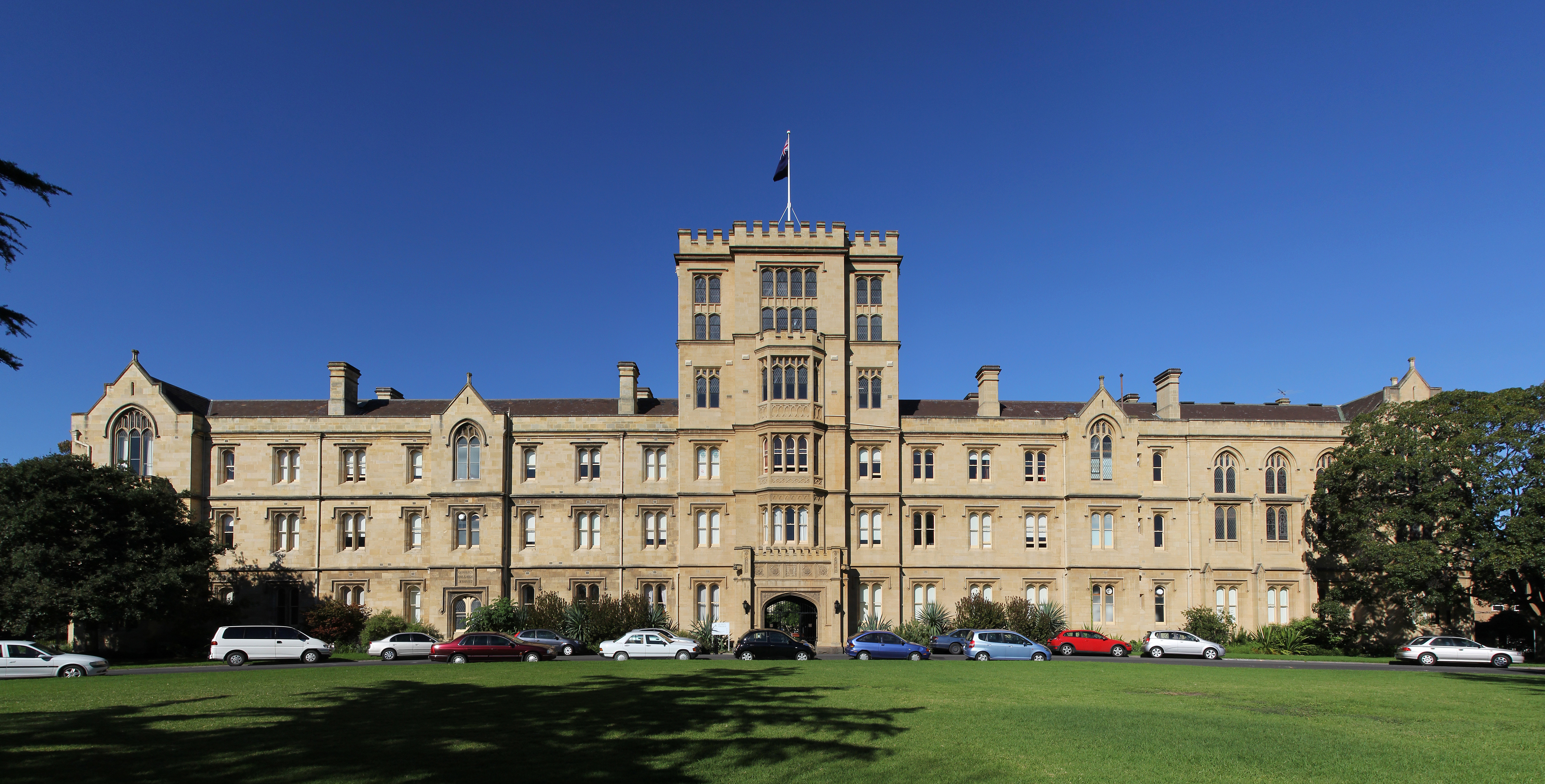
Queen's College

The first residential college at the University of Melbourne, Trinity College, opened in 1872. As of 2025, the residential colleges are:

- Graduate House
- International House
- Janet Clarke Hall
- Medley Hall
- Newman College
- Ormond College
- Queen's College
- St. Hilda's College
- St. Mary's College
- Trinity College
- University College

==== Monash University ====
There is one private residential college associated with Monash University:

- Mannix College

=== New South Wales ===
==== Macquarie University ====
There are three affiliated residential colleges at Macquarie University:

- Dunmore Lang College
- Morling Residential College
- Robert Menzies College

==== University of New England ====
There are five residential colleges at the University of New England:

- Austin Page College
- Duval College
- Mary White College
- Robb College
- Wright College

==== University of New South Wales ====
There are eight university-operated colleges and four independent colleges at the University of New South Wales.

University operated:

- Basser College
- Colombo House
- Fig Tree Hall
- Goldstein College
- International House
- New College
- Philip Baxter College
- UNSW Hall

Independent:

- Creston College
- New College
- Shalom College
- Warrane College

==== University of Sydney ====
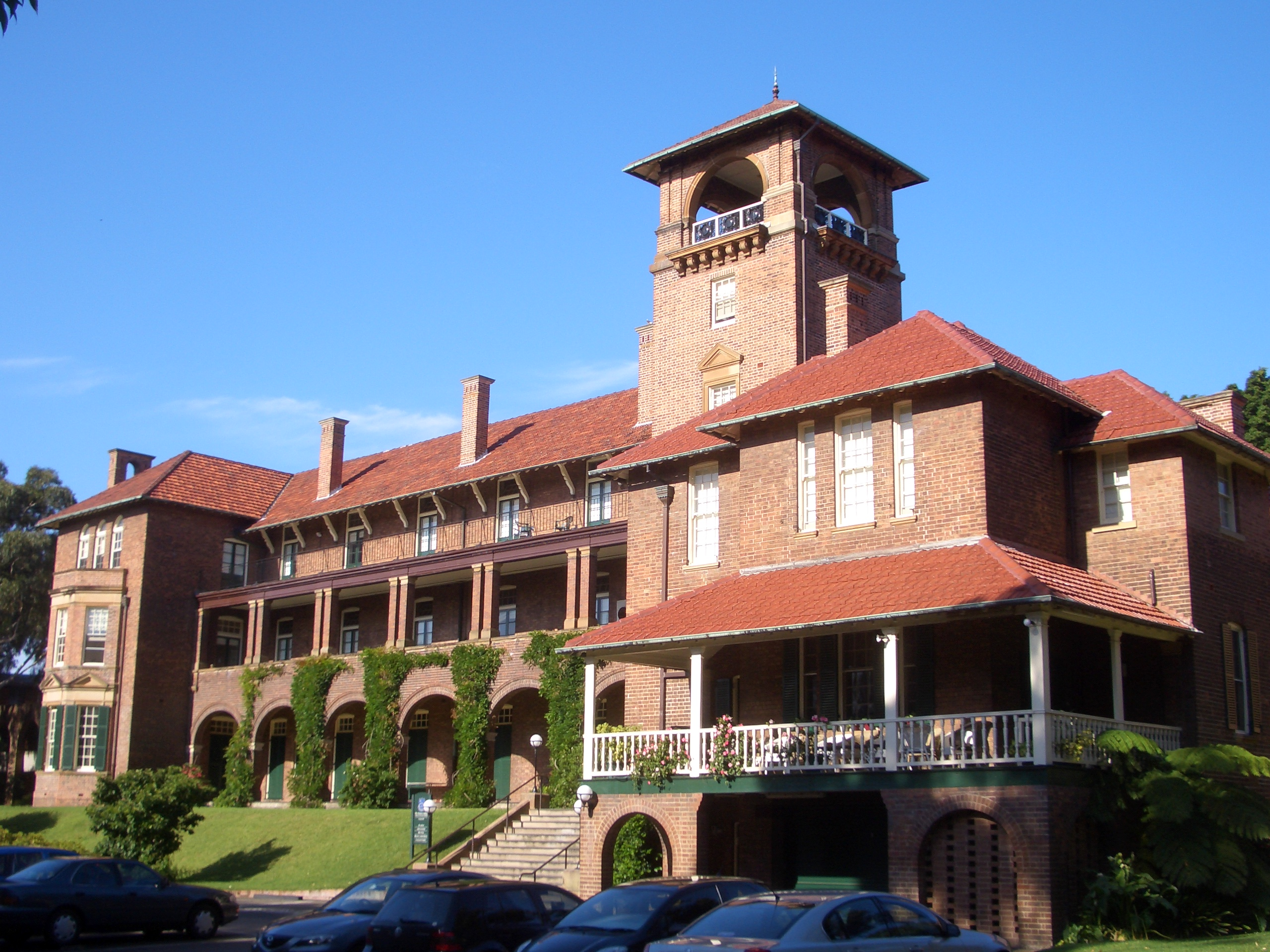
Women's College

Following the foundation of the secular University of Sydney in 1850, the New South Wales government supported the foundation of residential colleges at the new university by the main Christian denominations in the colonye, with the earliest being St. Paul's College (Anglican) in 1856 and St. John's College (Catholic) in 1857. As of 2025, there are seven residential colleges at the University of Sydney, two of which have associated graduate houses:

- Mandelbaum House
- Sancta Sophia College
  - Sancta Sophia's Graduate House
- St. Andrew's College
- St. John's College
- St. Paul's College
  - St. Paul's Graduate House
- Wesley College
- Women's College

=== Queensland ===
==== Independent colleges in Brisbane ====
There is one independent residential college in Brisbane, affiliated to the Uniting Church of Australia:

- Raymont Residential College

==== James Cook University ====
There are two colleges on the James Cook University Townsville, Bebegu Yumba campus:

- Saints Catholic College
- The John Flynn College

==== University of Queensland ====
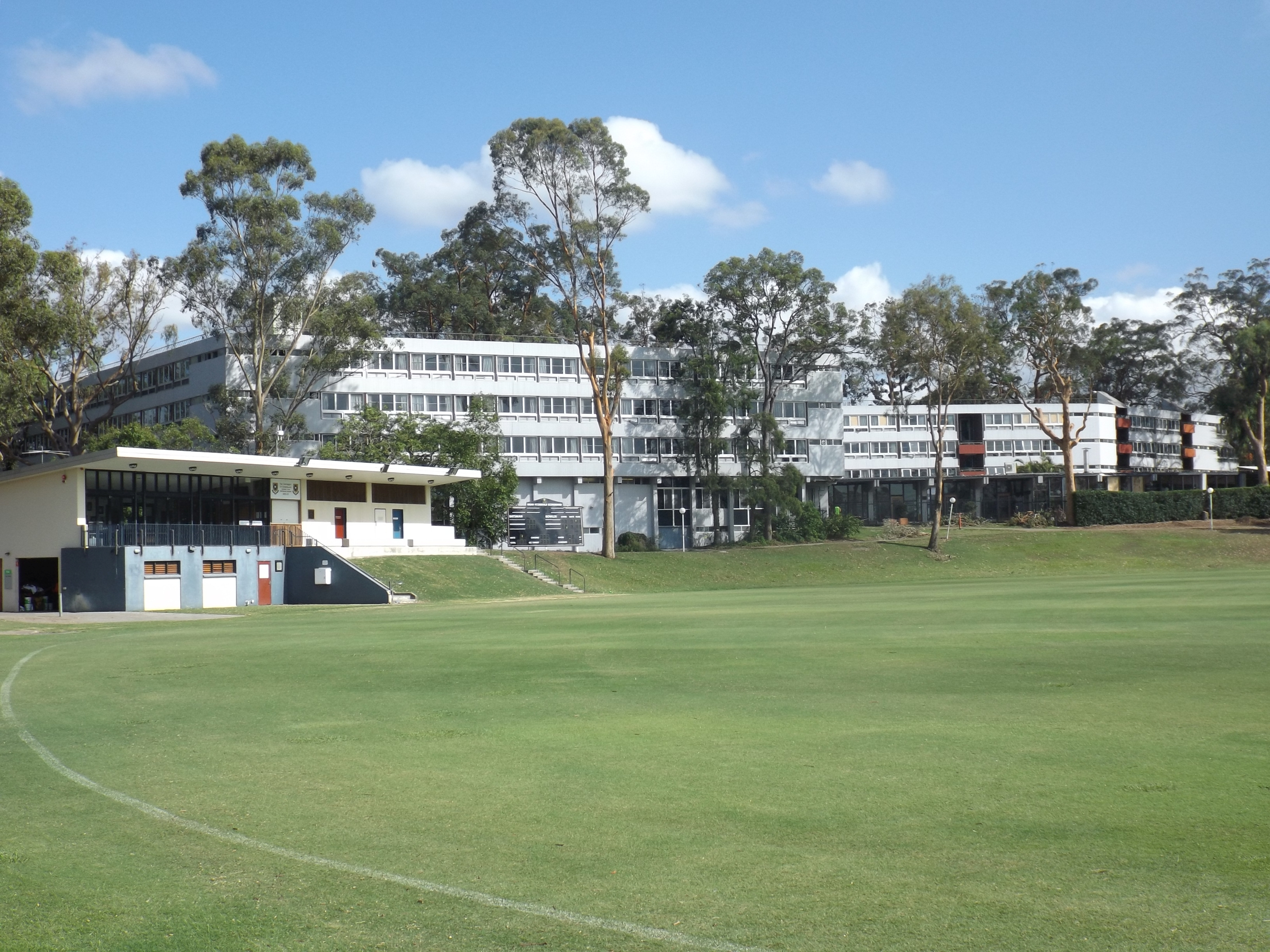
Union College seen over the university's cricket ground

There are ten colleges at the University of Queensland:

- Cromwell College
- Duschesne College
- Emmanuel College
- Grace College
- International House
- King's College
- St John's College
- St Leo's College
- Union College
- The Women's College

=== Western Australia ===
==== Curtin University ====
There is one independent college at Curtin University:

- St Catherine's College (St Catherine's Curtin; college also has a site on the UWA campus)

==== University of Western Australia ====
There are five colleges at the University of Western Australia:

- St Catherine's College (St Catherine's UWA; college also has a site on the Curtin campus)
- St George's College
- St Thomas Moore College
- Trinity College
- University Hall

== Canada ==
=== University of British Columbia ===
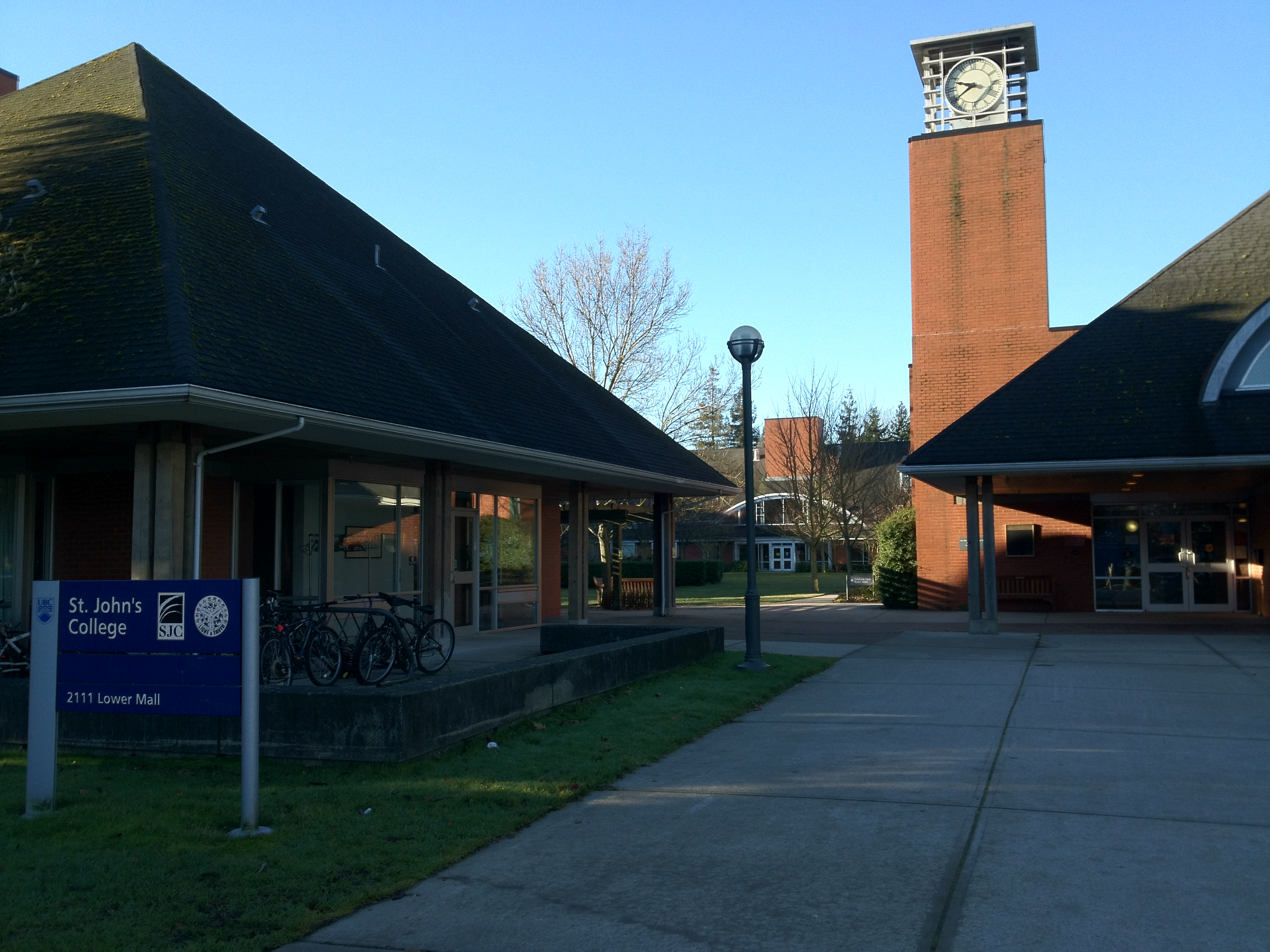
St. John's College

There are four residential colleges on the Vancouver campus of the University of British Columbia:

- Carey Centre (Christian residential community for undergraduate and graduate students)
- Green College (graduate students)
- St. Andrew's Hall (multi-disciplinary residential community at a Presbyterian Church in Canada theological college)
- St. John's College (graduate students, postdoctoral fellows and visiting scholars)

=== Trent University ===
There are five colleges at Trent University, with a sixth planned to open in 2028:

- Catharine Parr Traill College
- Champlain College
- Lady Eaton College
- Otonabee College
- Peter Gzowski College
- Gidigaa Migizi College (opening 2028)

=== University of Manitoba ===
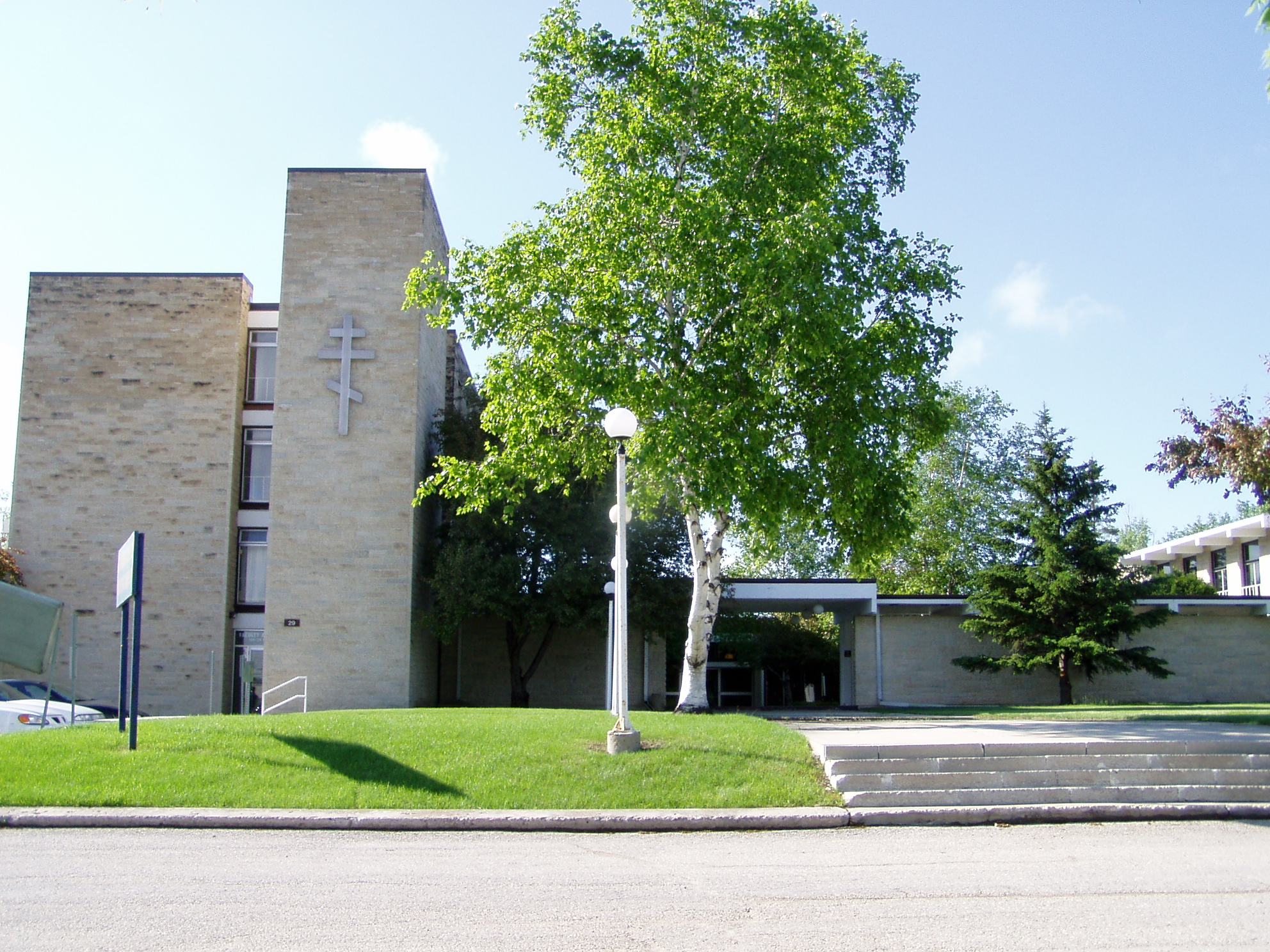
St. Andrew's College

The colleges affiliated to the University of Manitoba are:

- St. Andrew's College
- St. John's College
- St. Paul's College
- University College

=== University of Waterloo ===
The University of Waterloo has four residential university colleges on its campus that also offer academic programmes:

- Conrad Grebel University College
- Renison University College
- St. Jerome's University
- United College

=== University of Toronto ===
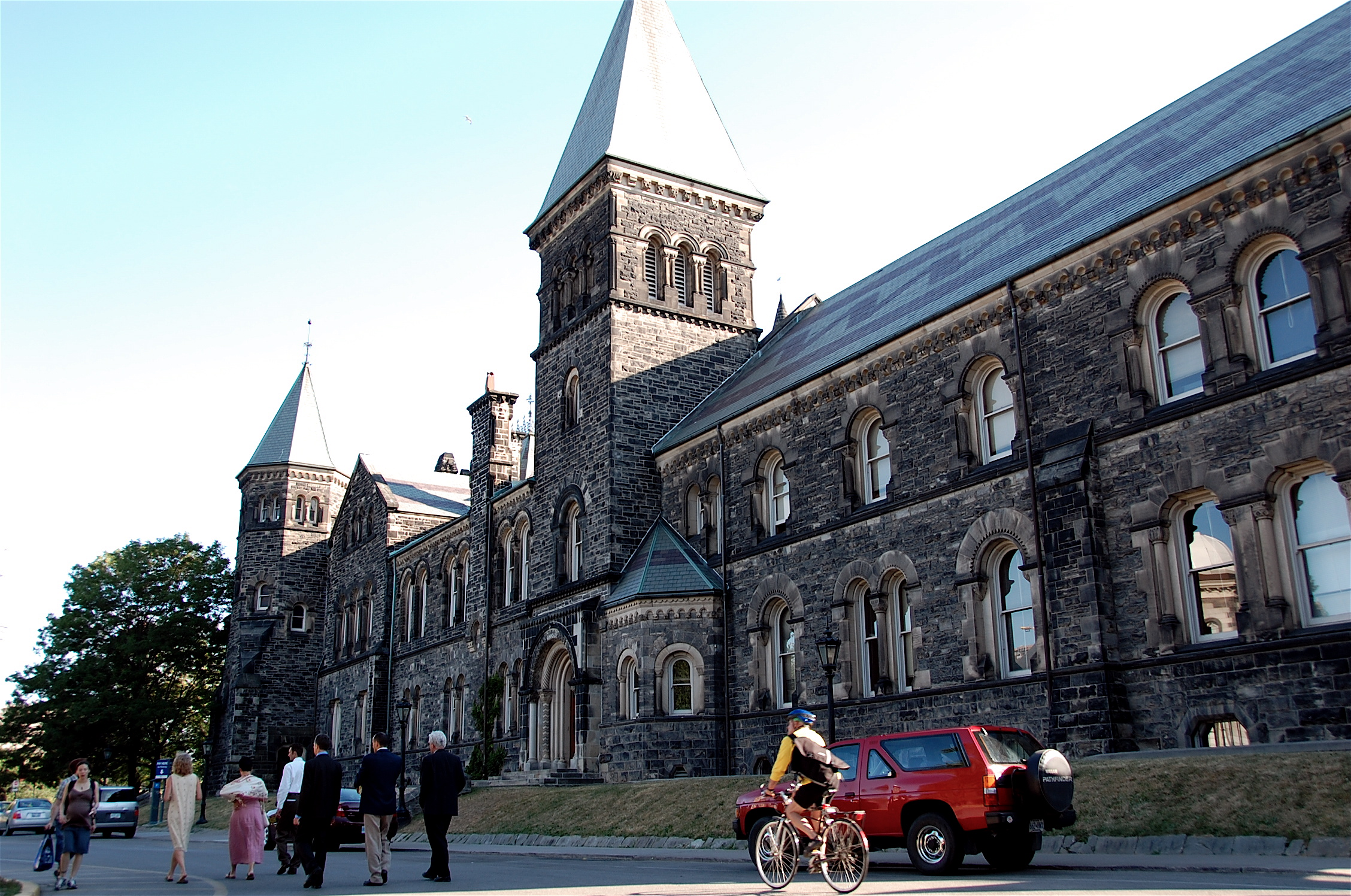
The east wing of University College

The University of Toronto has seven colleges on its St. George campus. All undergraduates in the faculty of arts and science are members of a college, but students in other faculties have only limited connections with the colleges. Three of the colleges are federated universities, while four are constituent colleges of the University of Toronto. The first college, University College, was established in 1853 but students did not come into residence until its building was completed in 1859.

The colleges are:

- Innis College
- New College
- St. Michael's College
- Trinity College
- University College
- Victoria University
- Woodsworth College

=== York University ===
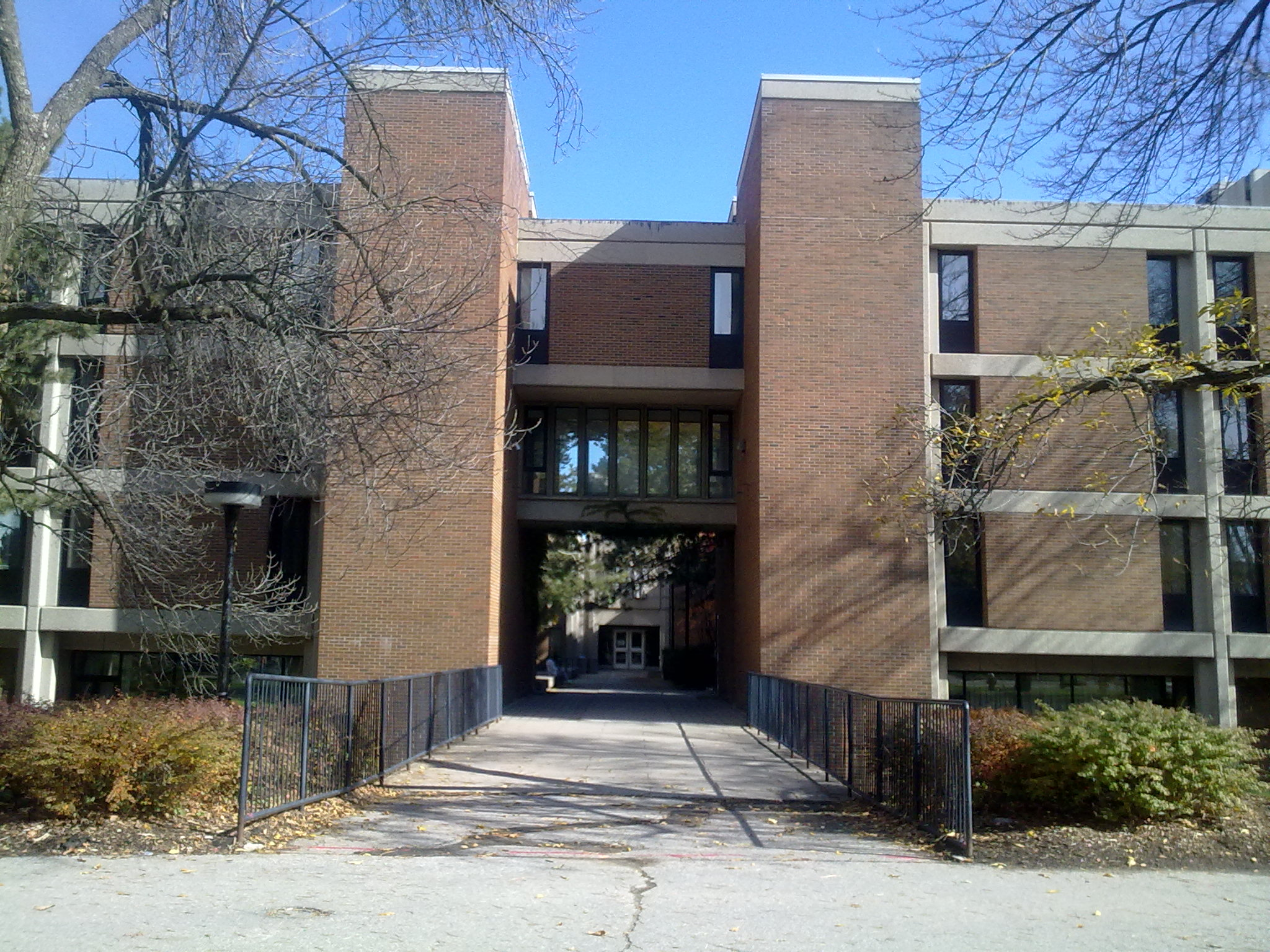
Founders College

There are nine colleges at York University. All undergraduate students are assigned a college based on their programme of study:

- Bethune College
- Calumet College
- Founders College
- Glendon College
- McLaughlin College
- New College
- Stong College
- Vanier College
- Winters College

== China ==
=== Chinese University of Hong Kong, Shenzhen ===
Chinese University of Hong Kong, Shenzhen, has seven colleges, with an eighth due to open in 2025:

- Shaw College
- Diligentia College
- Muse College
- Harmonia College
- Ling College
- Minerva College
- Duan Family College
- Eighth College (opening 2025)

== Germany ==
=== Constructor University ===
Constructor University in Bremen has four residential colleges: All pre-degree and undergraduate students are members of a college, while postgraduate students are housed off-campus.

- College Nordmetall
- College 3
- Krupp College
- Mercator College

== Hong Kong ==
=== Chinese University of Hong Kong ===
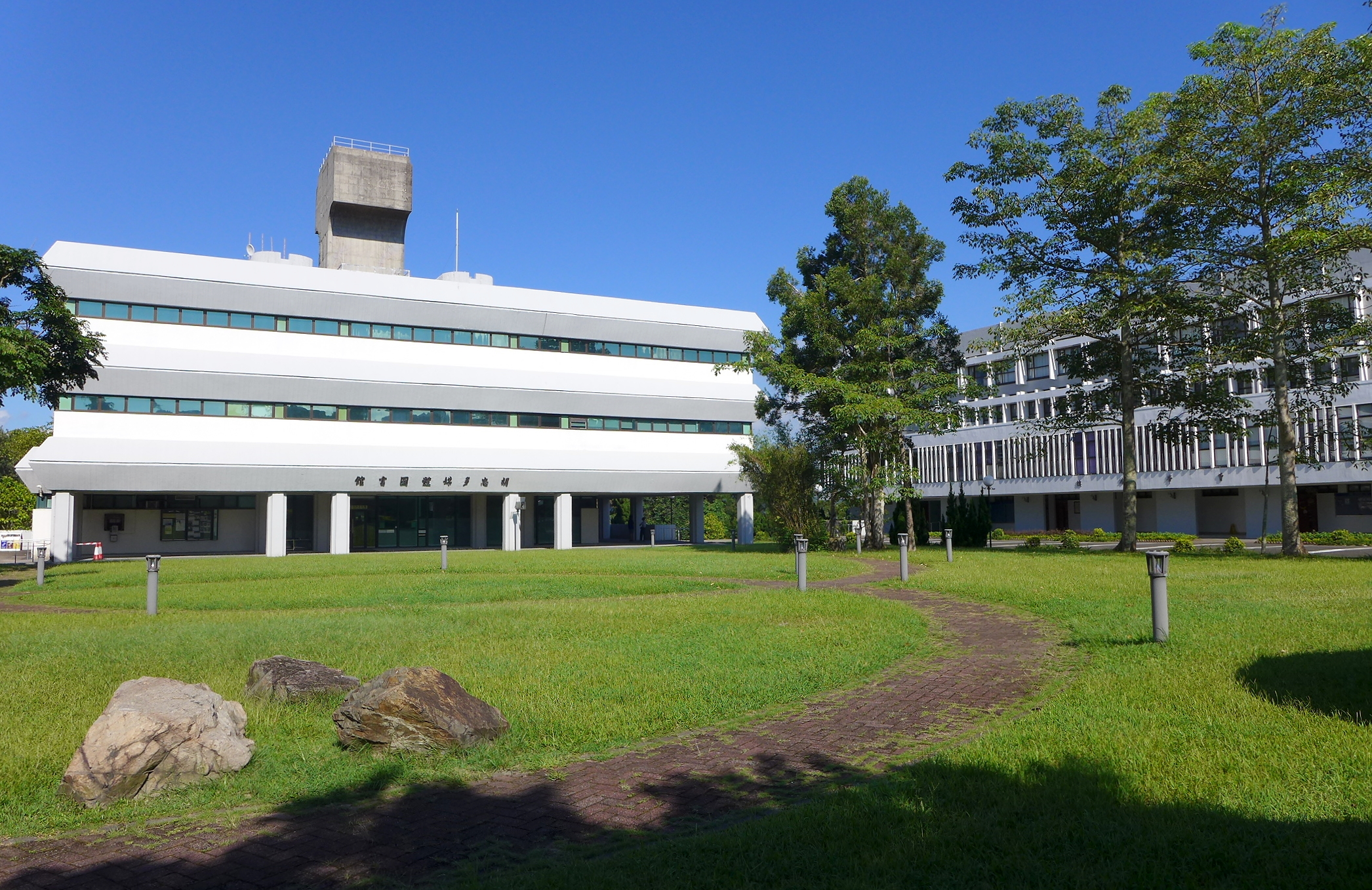
United College

There are nine colleges at the Chinese University of Hong Kong. All full-time undergraduates can apply to join one of the colleges.

- Chung Chi College
- New Asia College
- United College
- Shaw College
- Morningside College
- S. H. Ho College
- Lee Woo Sing College
- Wu Yee Sun College
- CW Chu College

=== University of Hong Kong ===
There are two clusters of residential colleges at the University of Hong Kong, the Jockey Club Student Village III and Jockey Club Student Village IV. Both clusters have 4 colleges.

==== Jockey Club Student Village III ====
- Shun Hing College
- Chi Sun College
- Lap-Chee College
- New College

==== Jockey Club Student Village IV ====
- College 1
- College 2
- Karson Choi College
- D. H. Chen College

== Italy ==
=== University of Bologna ===
There is one independent residential college at the University of Bologna, for students from Spain, founded in 1364:

- Collegio di Spagna

=== University of Pavia ===
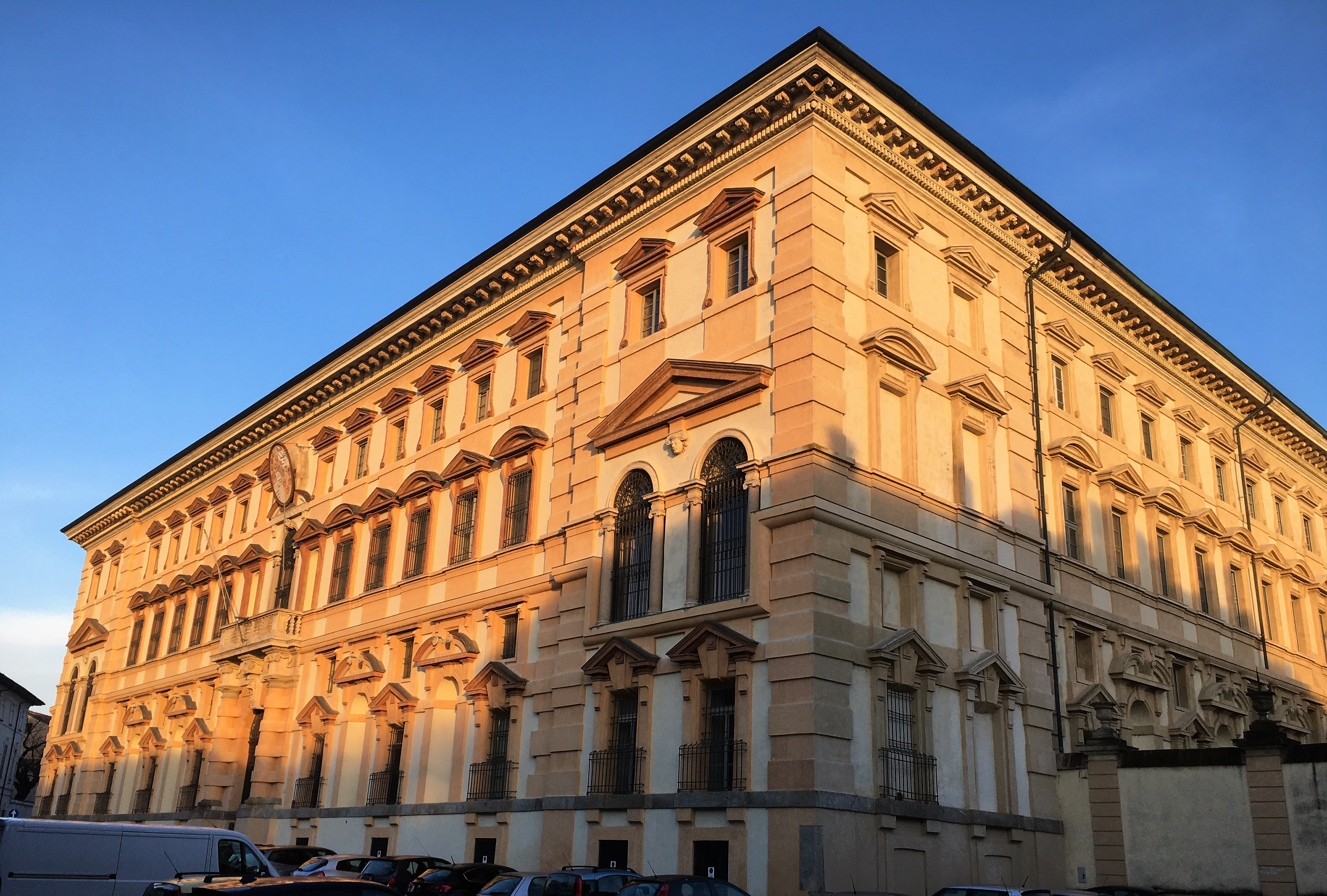
Collegio Borromeo

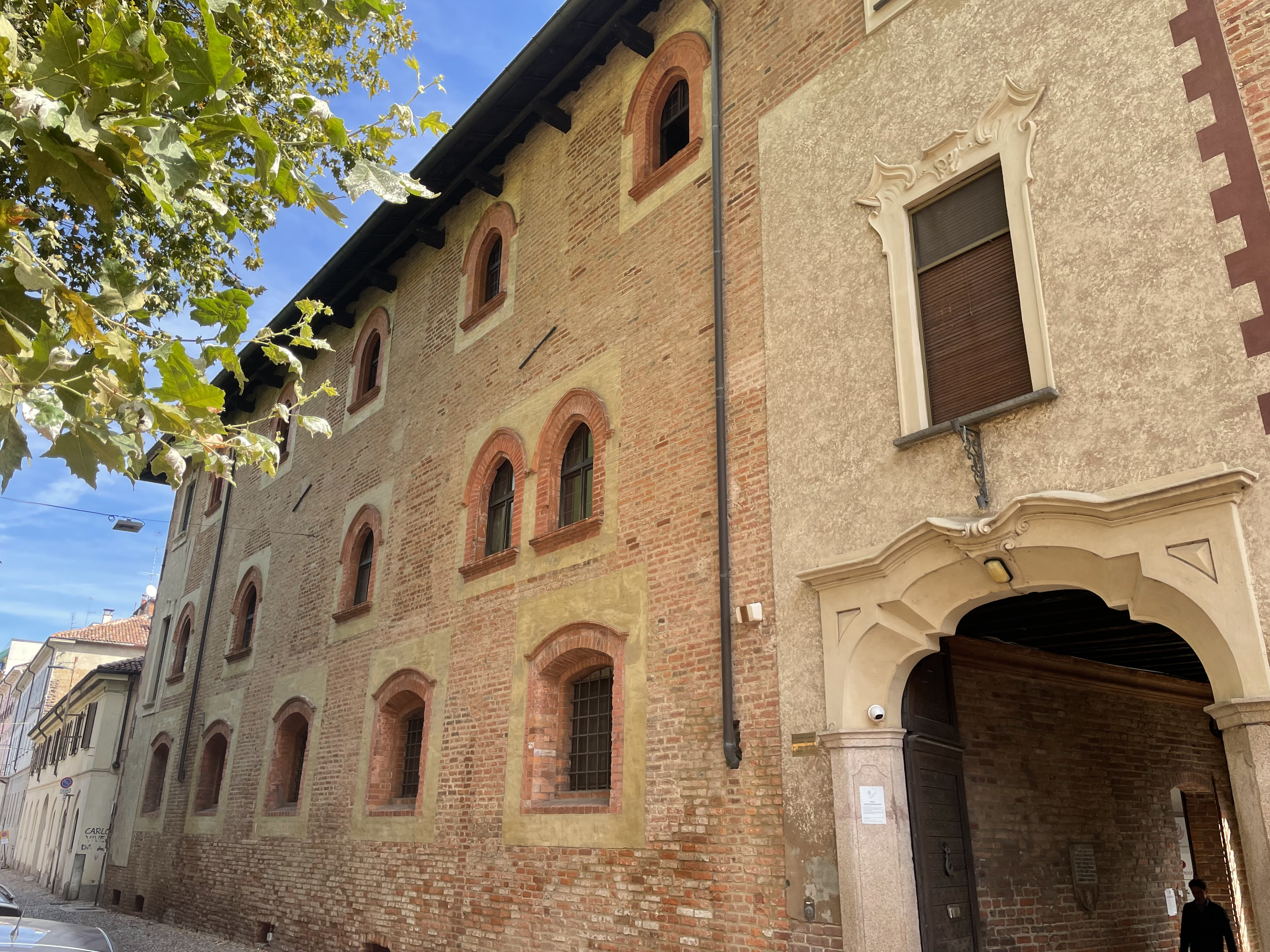
Collegio Castiglioni Brugnatelli

The University of Pavia has 18 residential colleges, with the oldest (Collegio Castiglioni Brugnatelli) dating back to 1429, before closing in 1805 and being re-established in 1954, and the two longest in continuous operation (Collegio Borromeo and Collegio Ghislieri) dating from 1561 and 1567 respectively. Twelve are state-owned, run by the autonomous Ente per il Diritto allo Studio Universitario (EDiSU) organisation (including one in Cremona), four are independent colleges "recognised by the Italian Ministry of University and Research" and two are private colleges. Students are not required to be members of a college.

- Collegio Alessandro Volta
- Collegio Benvenuto Griziotti
- Collegio Borromeo (independent)
- Collegio Camillo Golgi
- Collegio Castiglioni Brugnatelli
- Collegio Don Bosco
- Collegio Fratelli Cairoli
- Collegio Gerolamo Cardano
- Collegio Ghislieri (independent)
- Collegio Giasone del Maino
- Collegio Lazzaro Spallanzani
- Collegio Lorenzo Valla
- Collegio Maria Ausiliatrice (private)
- Collegio Nuovo (independent)
- Collegio Plinio Fraccaro
- Collegio Quartier Novo (Cremona)
- Collegio Santa Caterina da Siena (independent)
- Collegio Senatore (private)

== Macau ==
=== University of Macau ===
The University of Macau has ten residential colleges:

- Chao Kuang Piu College
- Cheng Yu Tung College
- Cheong Kun Lun College
- Choi Kai Yau College
- Henry Fox Pearl Jubilee College
- Lui Che Woo College
- Ma Man Kei and Lo Pak Sam College
- Moon Chun Memorial College
- Shiu Pong College
- Stanley Ho East Asia College

== New Zealand ==
=== University of Otago ===
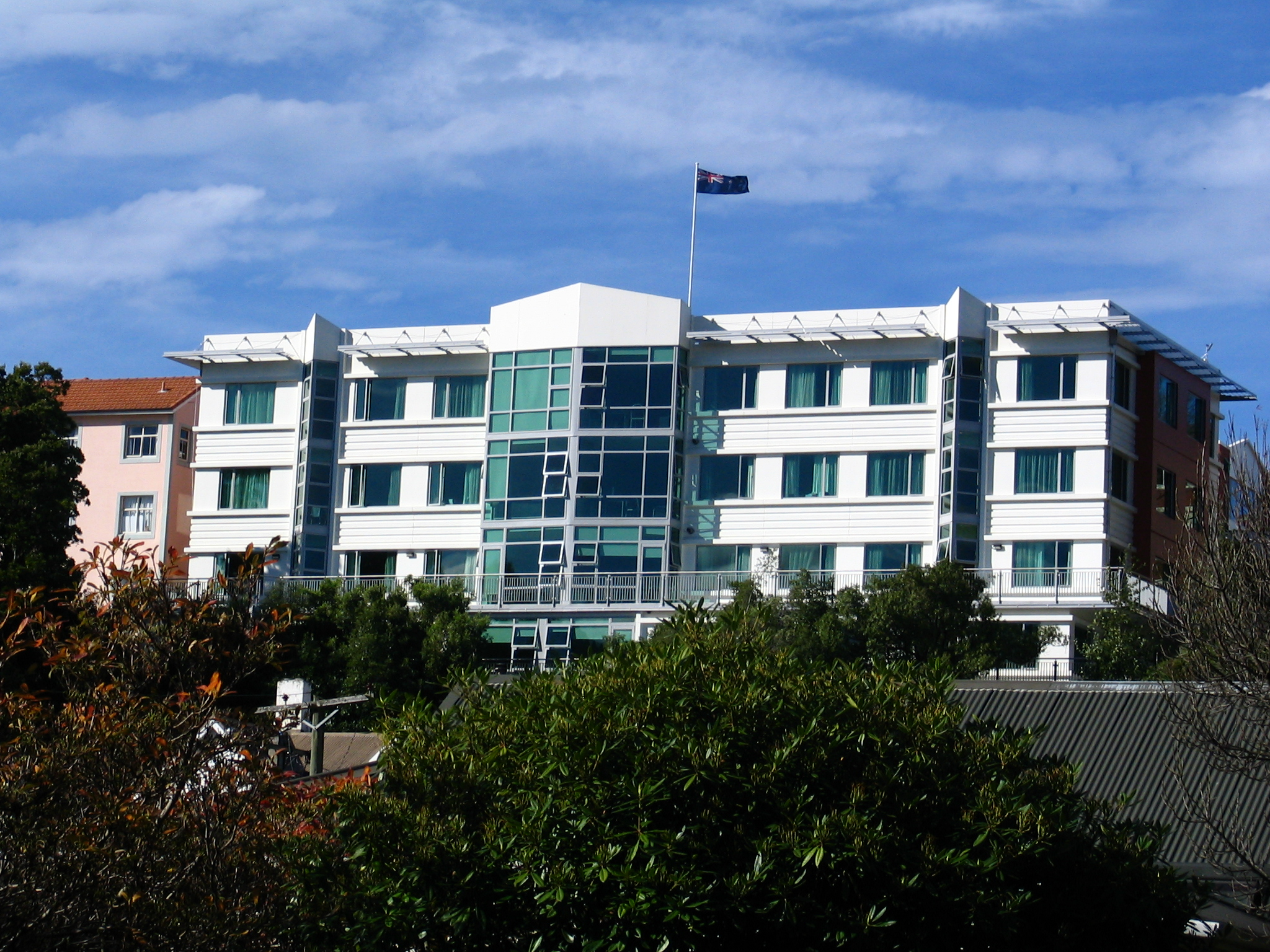
Arana College

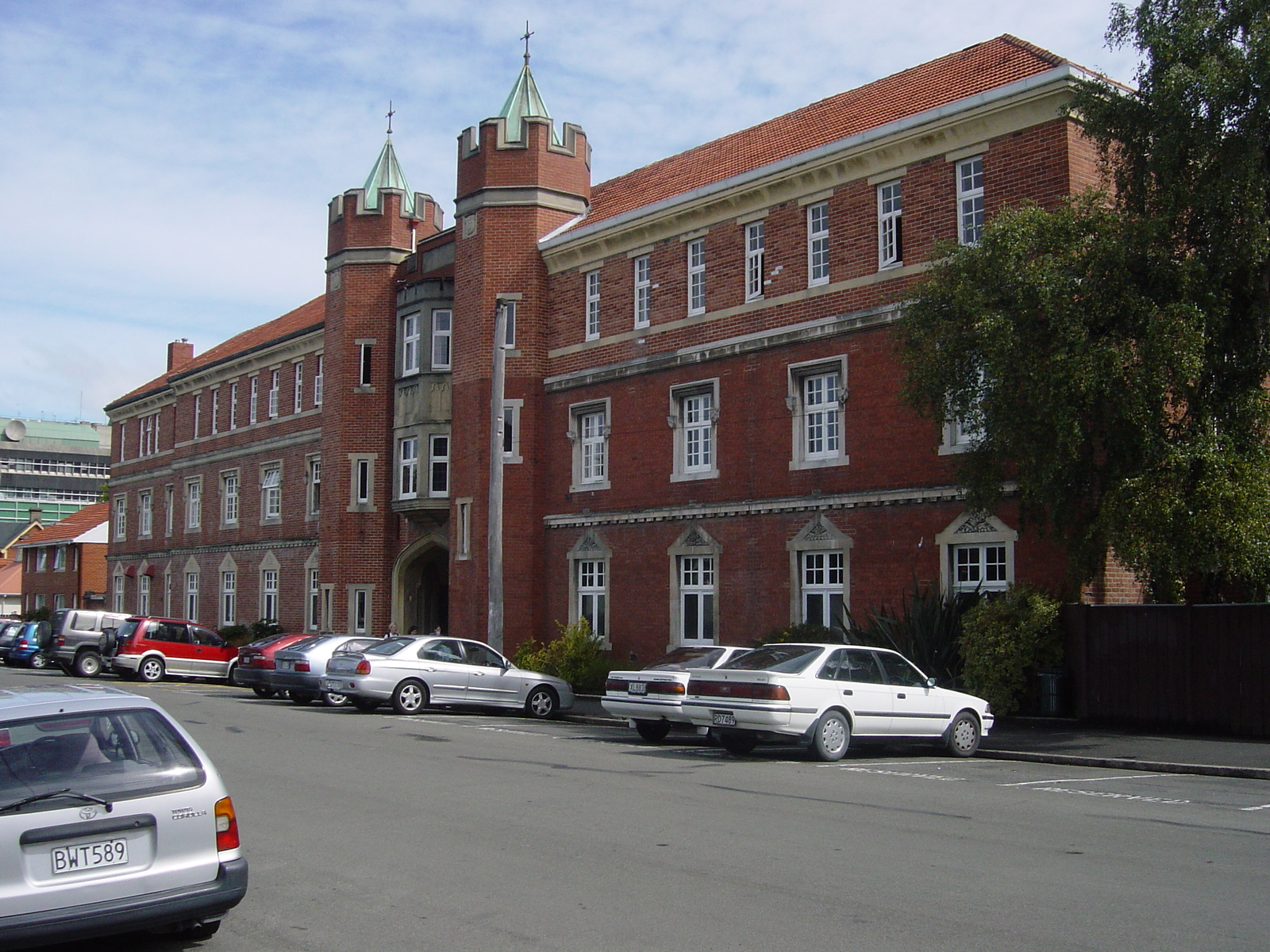
Selwyn College

The University of Otago has 14 residential colleges (alongside other accommodation options), of which 11 are undergraduate only and 3 take both postgraduates and undergraduates.

- 192 Castle College
- Aquinas College
- Arana College (undergraduate and postgraduate)
- Caroline Freeman College
- Carrington College
- Cumberland College
- Hayward College
- Knox College (undergraduate and postgraduate)
- St Margaret's College
- Salmond College (undergraduate and postgraduate)
- Selwyn College
- Studholme College
- Te Rangihīroa College
- University College

== Singapore ==
=== National University of Singapore ===
There are four residential colleges at the National University of Singapore, among other residential options:

- College of Alice and Peter Tan
- Ridge View Residential College
- Residential College 4
- Tembusu College

== South Africa ==
=== University of the Free State ===
The University of the Free State instituted residential colleges to promote better racial integration following widespread outrage in 2008 over a racist video made by four white students at the Reitz hostel at the university. There are now five residential colleges at the university:

- Central College
- East College
- North College
- South College
- West College

== South Korea ==
=== POSTECH ===
First year students and some second year students at POSTECH live in the residential college:

- Residential College

=== Yonsei University ===
There are twelve houses within the 'residential college' at Yonsei University. This is a residential programme, separate from the actual dormitories at the university.

- Evergreen House
- Wonchul House
- Underwood House
- Yun Dong-Joo House
- Muak House
- Chi Won House
- Baek Yang House
- Cheongsong House
- Yongjae House
- Avison House
- Allen International House
- Appenzeller International House

=== Handong Global University ===
There are six residential colleges at Handong Global University:

- Torrey College
- Kuyper College
- Sonyangwon College
- Philadelphos College
- Jangkiryeo College
- Carmichael College

== Spain ==
Following the establishments of the Collegio di Spagna (College of the Spanish) at the University of Bologna in Italy, the first college to be established in Spain itself was San Bartolomé College at the University of Salamanca in 1404, with further colleges being founded after this at other Spanish universities. The colleges were suppressed in 1798. An attempt to re-establish the tradition was made with the Residencia de Estudiantes in 1910, which ended with the Spanish Civil War. The Franco regime restored the colleges in the 1940s, but these then became a focal point for dissent and formed people who played a leading role in Spain's transition to democracy.

=== Autonomous University of Madrid ===
There are three colleges at the Autonomous University of Madrid:

- Colegio Mayor Universitario Castilla
- Colegio Mayor Universitario Somosierra
- Colegio Mayor Universitario Juan Luis Vives

=== University of Barcelona ===
There are four colleges at the University of Barcelona:

- Colegio Mayor Universitario Mater Salvatoris
- Colegio Mayor Universitario Monterols
- Colegio Mayor Universitario Pedralbes
- Colegio Mayor Universitario Penyafort-Montserrat

=== University of the Basque Country ===
There is one college at the University of the Basque Country:

- Colegio Mayor Universitario Miguel de Unamuno

=== University of Cádiz ===
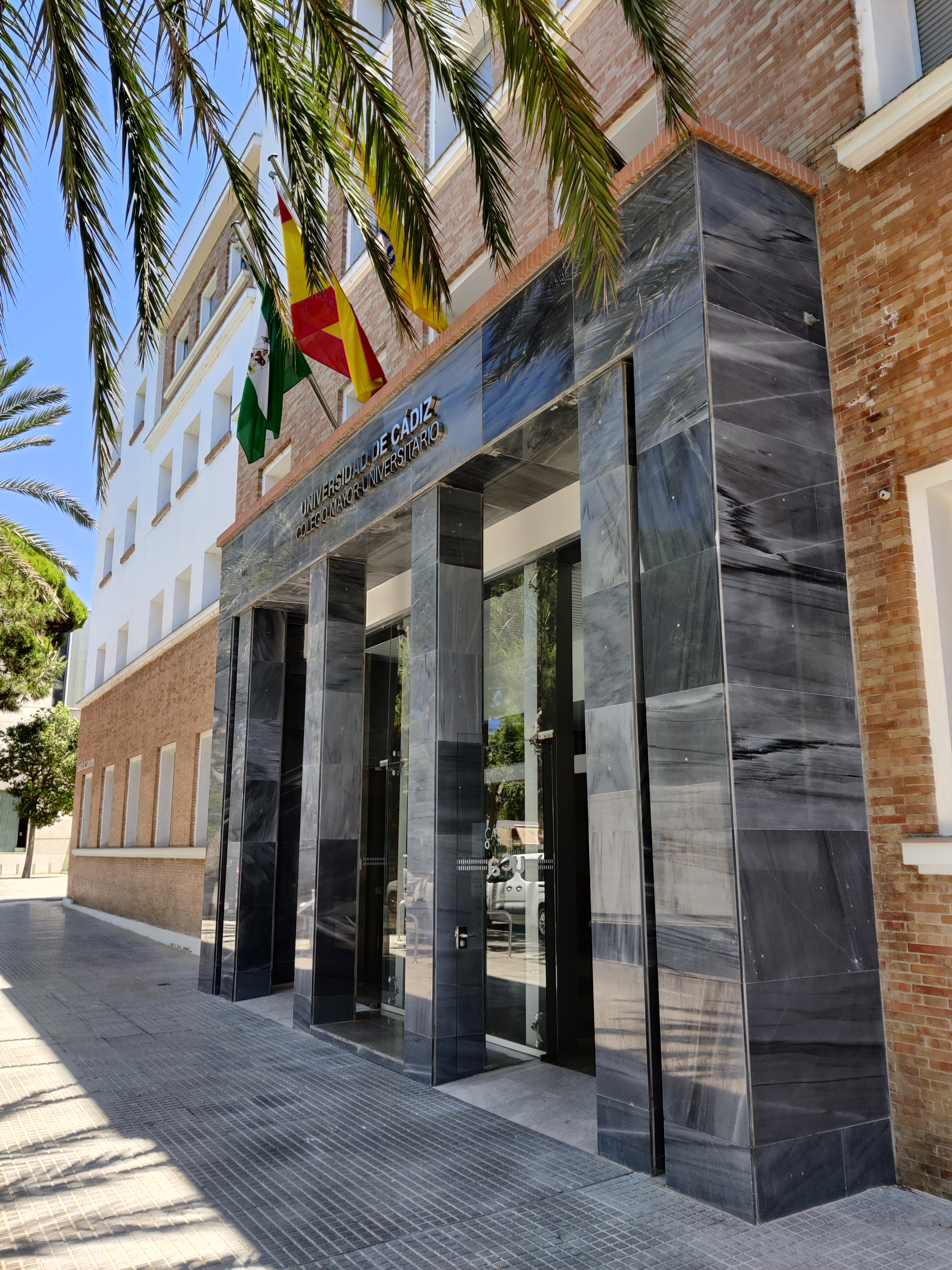
Colegio Mayor de la Universidad de Cádiz

There is one college at the University of Cádiz:

- Colegio Mayor de la Universidad de Cádiz

=== CEU San Pablo University ===
There is one college at CEU San Pablo University:

- Colegio Mayor Universitario San Pablo

=== Charles III University of Madrid ===
There are three colleges at the Charles III University of Madrid:

- Colegio Mayor Fernando de los Ríos
- Colegio Mayor Fernando Abril Martorell
- Colegio Mayor Gregorio Peces-Barba

=== Comillas Pontifical University ===
There is one college at Comillas Pontifical University:

- Colegio Mayor Universitario Berrospe

=== Complutense University of Madrid ===
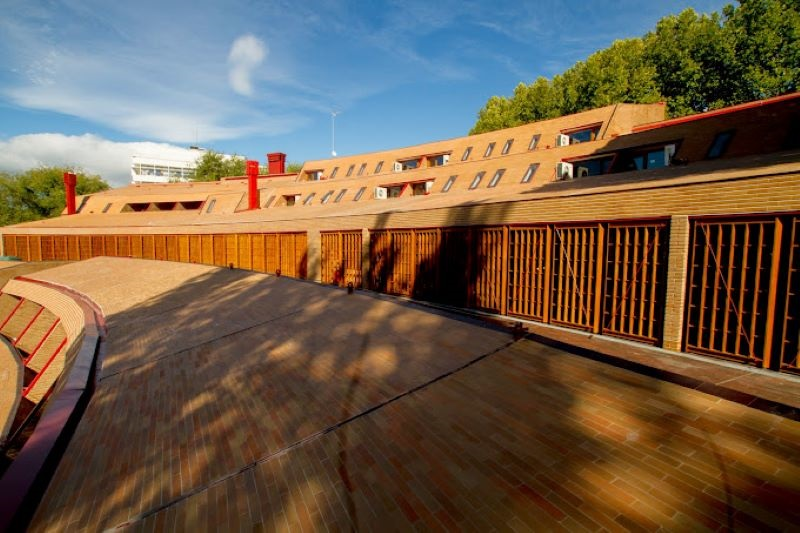
Colegio Mayor Universitario Argentino Nuestra Sra. de Luján

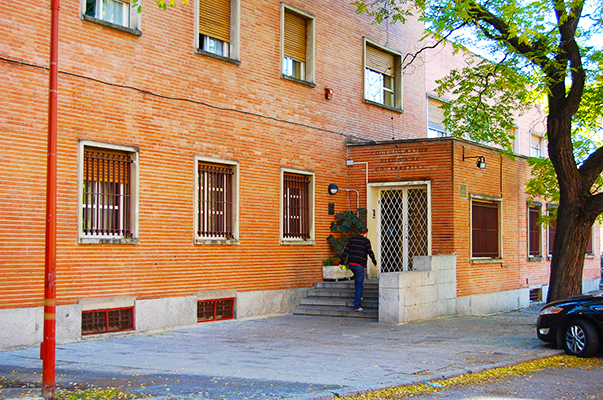
Colegio Mayor Diego de Covarrubias

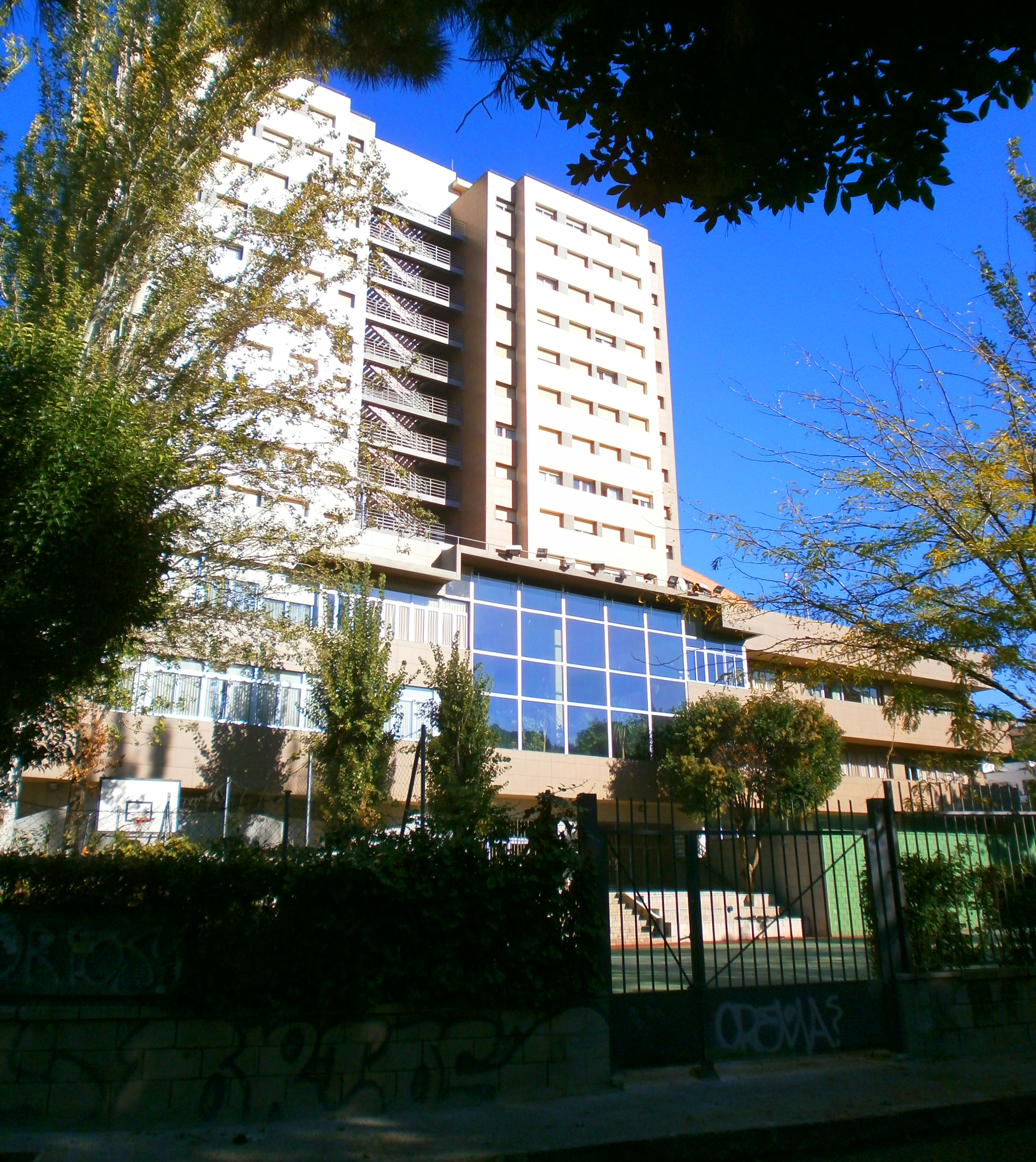
Colegio Mayor Universitario Méndel

There are five colleges owned by the Complutense University of Madrid:

- Colegio Mayor Antonio de Nebrija
- Colegio Mayor Diego de Covarrubias
- Colegio Mayor Santa María de Europa
- Colegio Mayor Teresa de Jesús
- Colegio Mayor Ximénez de Cisneros

There are also 28 affiliated independent colleges:

- Colegio Mayor Universitario Alcalá
- Colegio Mayor Universitario Alcor
- Colegio Mayor Universitario Aquinas
- Colegio Mayor Universitario Argentino Nuestra Sra. de Luján
- Colegio Mayor Universitario Barberán y Collar
- Colegio Mayor Universitario Casa do Brasil
- Colegio Mayor Universitario Chaminade
- Colegio Mayor Universitario Elías Ahúja
- Colegio Mayor Universitario Fundación SEPI
- Colegio Mayor Universitario Isabel de España
- Colegio Mayor Universitario Jaime del Amo
- Colegio Mayor Universitario Jorge Juan
- Colegio Mayor Universitario Juan XXIII Roncalli
- Colegio Mayor Universitario Loyola
- Colegio Mayor Universitario Mara
- Colegio Mayor Universitario Marqués de la Ensenada
- Colegio Mayor Universitario Mater Salvatoris
- Colegio Mayor Universitario Méndel
- Colegio Mayor Universitario Moncloa
- Colegio Mayor Universitario Montalbán
- Colegio Mayor Universitario Ntra. Sra. de Guadalupe
- Colegio Mayor Universitario Pio XII
- Colegio Mayor Universitario Poveda
- Colegio Mayor Universitario San Agustín
- Colegio Mayor Universitario Santa Mónica
- Colegio Mayor Universitario Sta. Maria del Pino
- Colegio Mayor Universitario Vedruna
- Colegio Mayor Universitario Zurbarán

=== University of Córdoba ===
There is one college at the University of Córdoba:

- Colegio Mayor Universitario Ntra. Sra. de la Asunción

=== University of Deusto ===
There is one college at the University of Deusto:

- Colegio Mayor Universitario Deusto

=== Francisco de Vitoria University ===
There is one college at Francisco de Vitoria University:

- Colegio Mayor Universitario Francisco de Vitoria

=== University of Granada ===
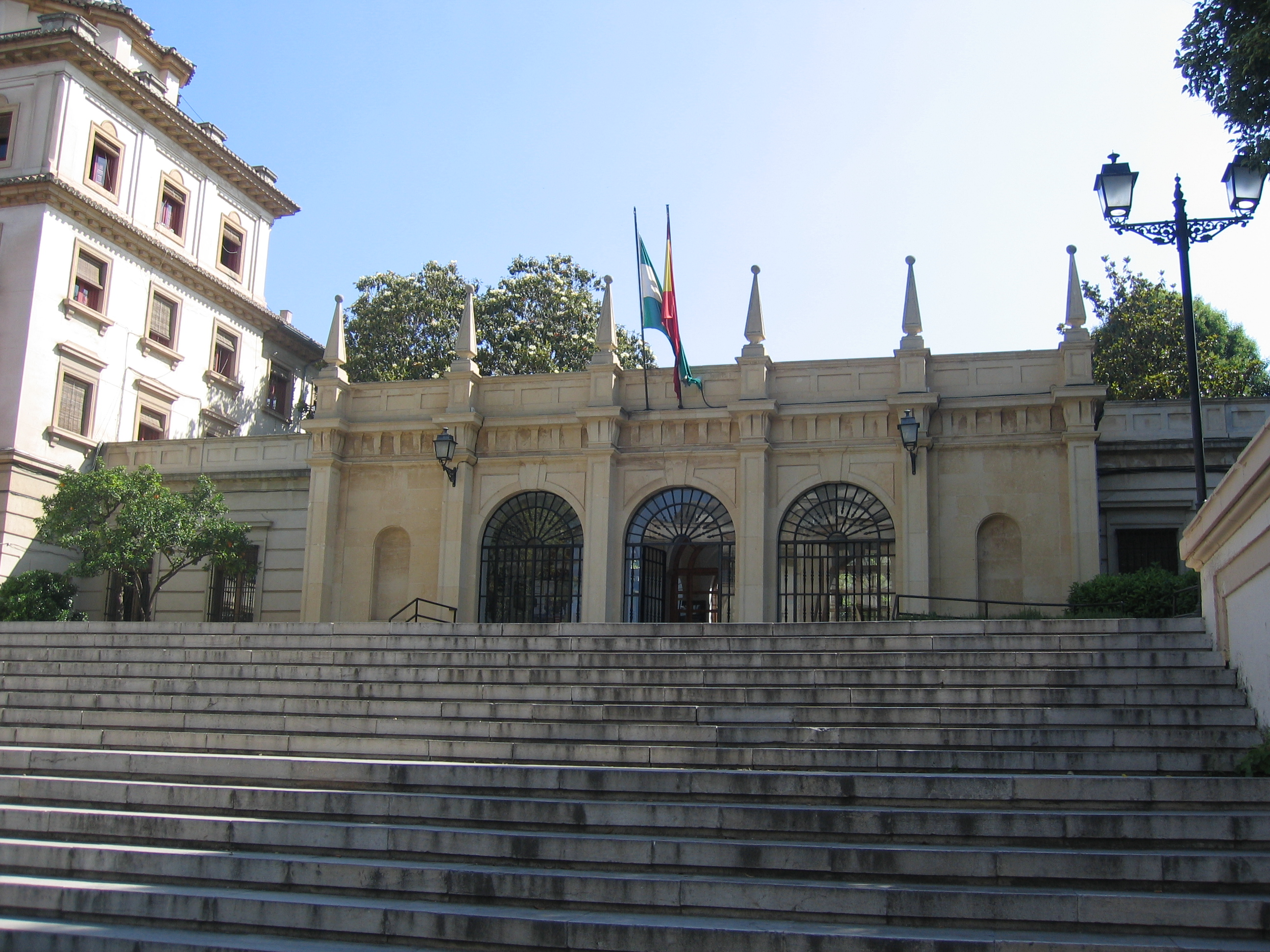
Colegio Mayor Universitario Isabel la Católica

There are six colleges at the University of Granada, one university-owned and five affiliated: University owned:

- Colegio Mayor Universitario Isabel la Católica

Affiliated:

- Colegio Mayor Universitario Albayzín
- Colegio Mayor Universitario Cardenal Cisneros
- Colegio Mayor Universitario JESÚS-MARÍA
- Colegio Mayor Universitario Santo Domingo
- Colegio Mayor Universitario Sta. María

=== Independent colleges in Barcelona ===
There is one independent college in Barcelona:

- Colegio Mayor Universitario Bonaigua

=== Independent colleges in Valencia ===
There is one independent college in Valencia:

- Colegio Mayor Universitario La Asunción de Nuestra Señora

=== Independent colleges in Granada ===
The is one independent college in Granada:

- Colegio Mayor Universitario Alsajara

=== University of León ===
There is one college at the University of León:

- Colegio Mayor Universitario San Isidoro

=== Mondragon University ===
There is one college at Mondragon University:

- Colegio Mayor Universitario Pedro Biteri

=== University of Navarra ===
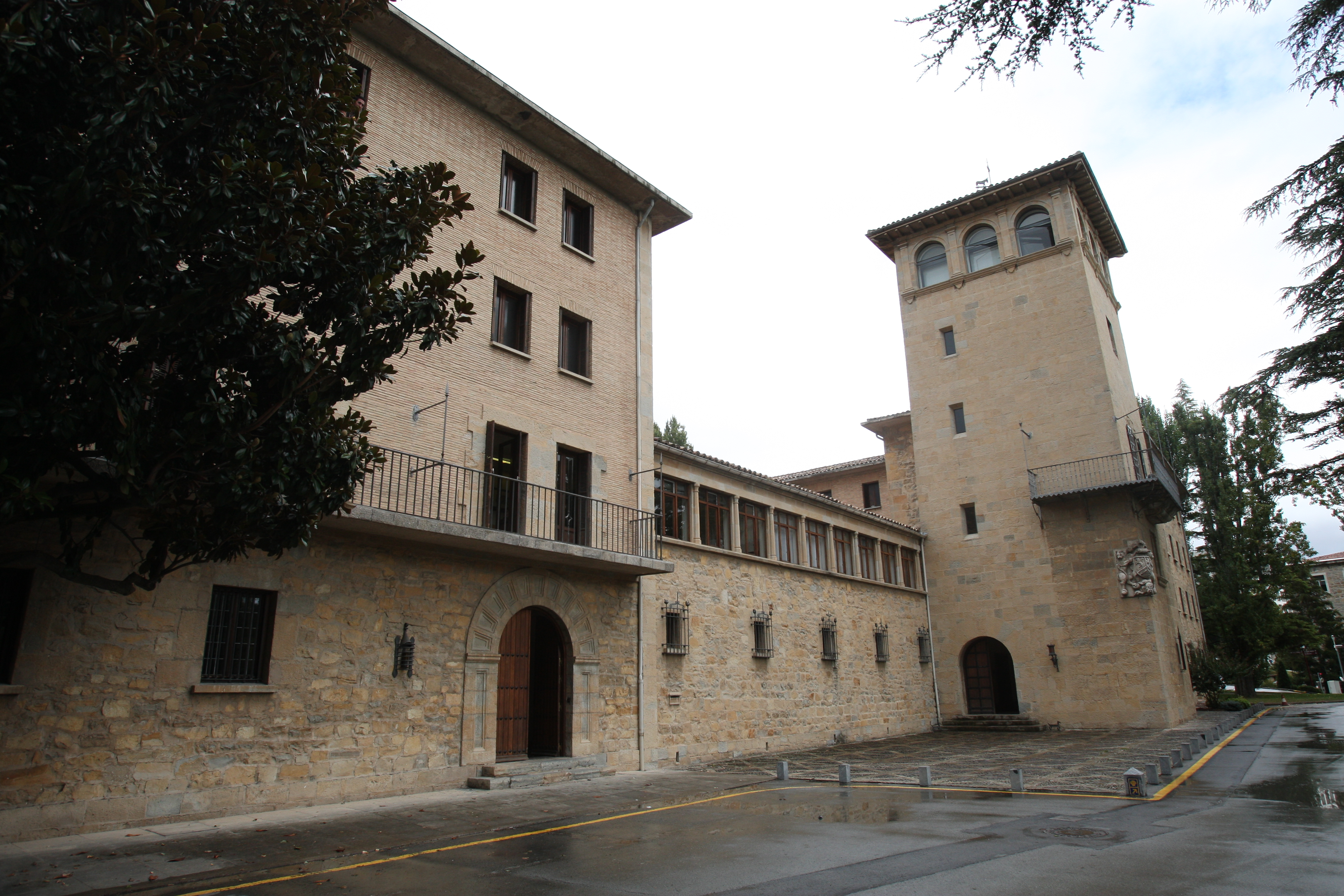
Colegio Mayor Universitario Belagua

There are nine colleges on the main Pamplona campus of the University of Navarra:

- Colegio Mayor Universitario Aralar
- Colegio Mayor Universitario Belagua
- Colegio Mayor Universitario Goimendi
- Colegio Mayor Universitario Goroabe
- Colegio Mayor Universitario Larraona
- Colegio Mayor Universitario Mendaur
- Colegio Mayor Universitario Olabidea
- Colegio Mayor Universitario Santa Clara
- Colegio Mayor Universitario Sta. Maria del Lago

There are also two college on the San Sebastián campus:

- Colegio Mayor Universitario Ayete
- Colegio Mayor Universitario Jaizkibel

=== University of Salamanca ===
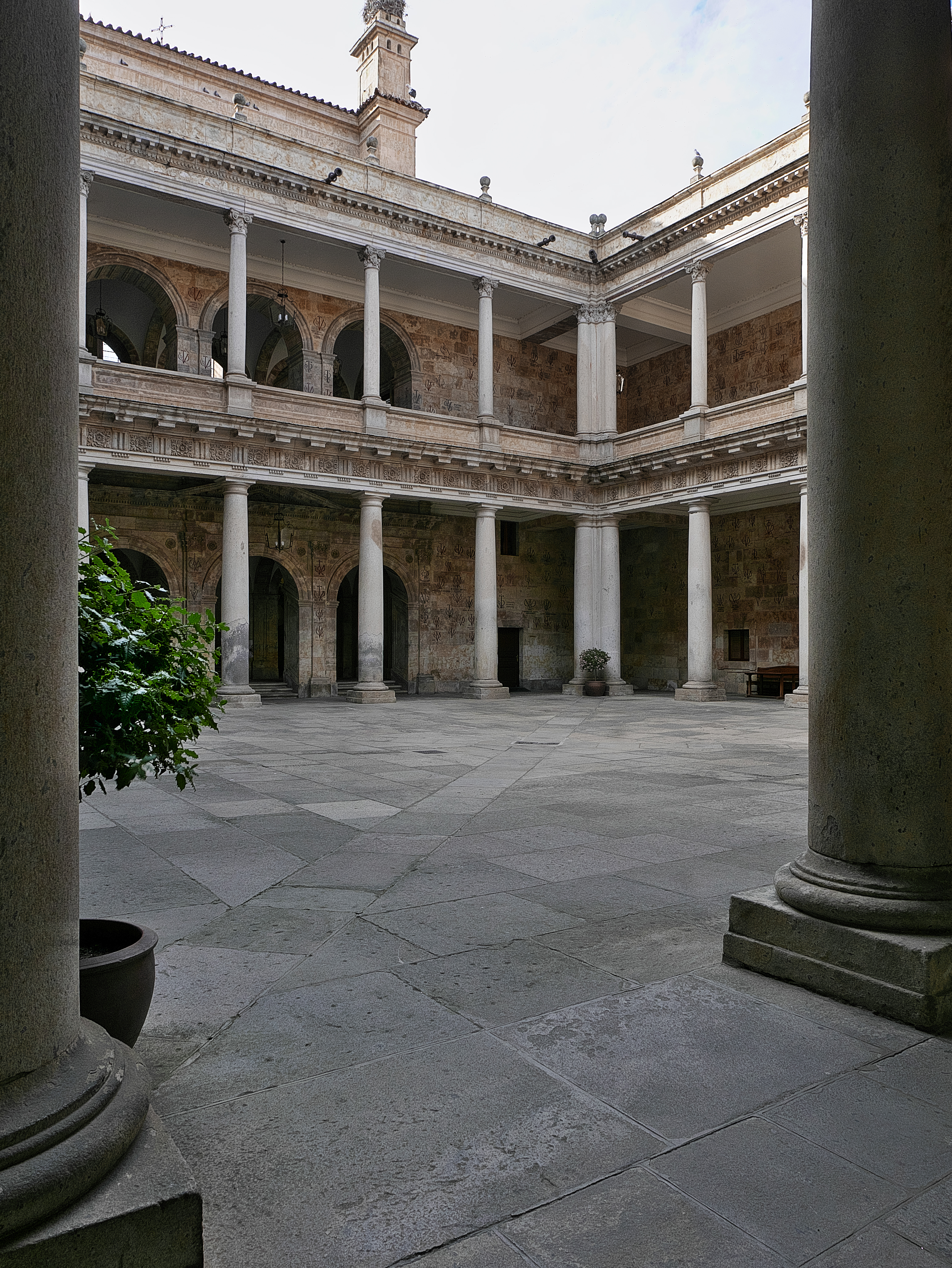
Colegio Mayor San Bartolomé

There are three colleges at the University of Salamanca:

- Colegio Mayor San Bartolomé
- Colegio Mayor Fray Luis de León
- Colegio Mayor Oviedo

There is also one independent college affiliated with the university:

- Colegio Mayor Universitario Montellano

=== University of Santiago de Compostela ===
There are two colleges affiliated with the University of Santiago de Compostela:

- Colegio Mayor Universitario Arosa
- Colegio Mayor Universitario La Estila

=== University of Seville ===
There are five colleges at the University of Seville:

- Colegio Mayor Universitario Alborán
- Colegio Mayor Universitario Almonte
- Colegio Mayor Universitario Guadaira
- Colegio Mayor Universitario Hernando Colón
- Colegio Mayor Universitario San Juan Bosco

=== Technical University of Madrid ===
There is one college at the Technical University of Madrid:

- Colegio Mayor Universitario Ntra. Sra. de África

=== University of Valencia ===
There are five colleges at the University of Valencia:

- Colegio Mayor Universitario Albalat
- Colegio Mayor Universitario La Alameda
- Colegio Mayor Universitario San Juan De Ribera
- Colegio Mayor Universitario Saomar
- Colegio Mayor Universitario Rector Peset

=== University of Valladolid ===
There are three colleges affiliated with the University of Valladolid:

- Colegio Mayor Universitario María de Molina
- Colegio Mayor Universitario Peñafiel
- Colegio Mayor Universitario San Juan Evangelista

=== Villanueva University ===
There is one college at Villanueva University:

- Colegio Mayor Universitario Santillana

=== University of Zaragoza ===
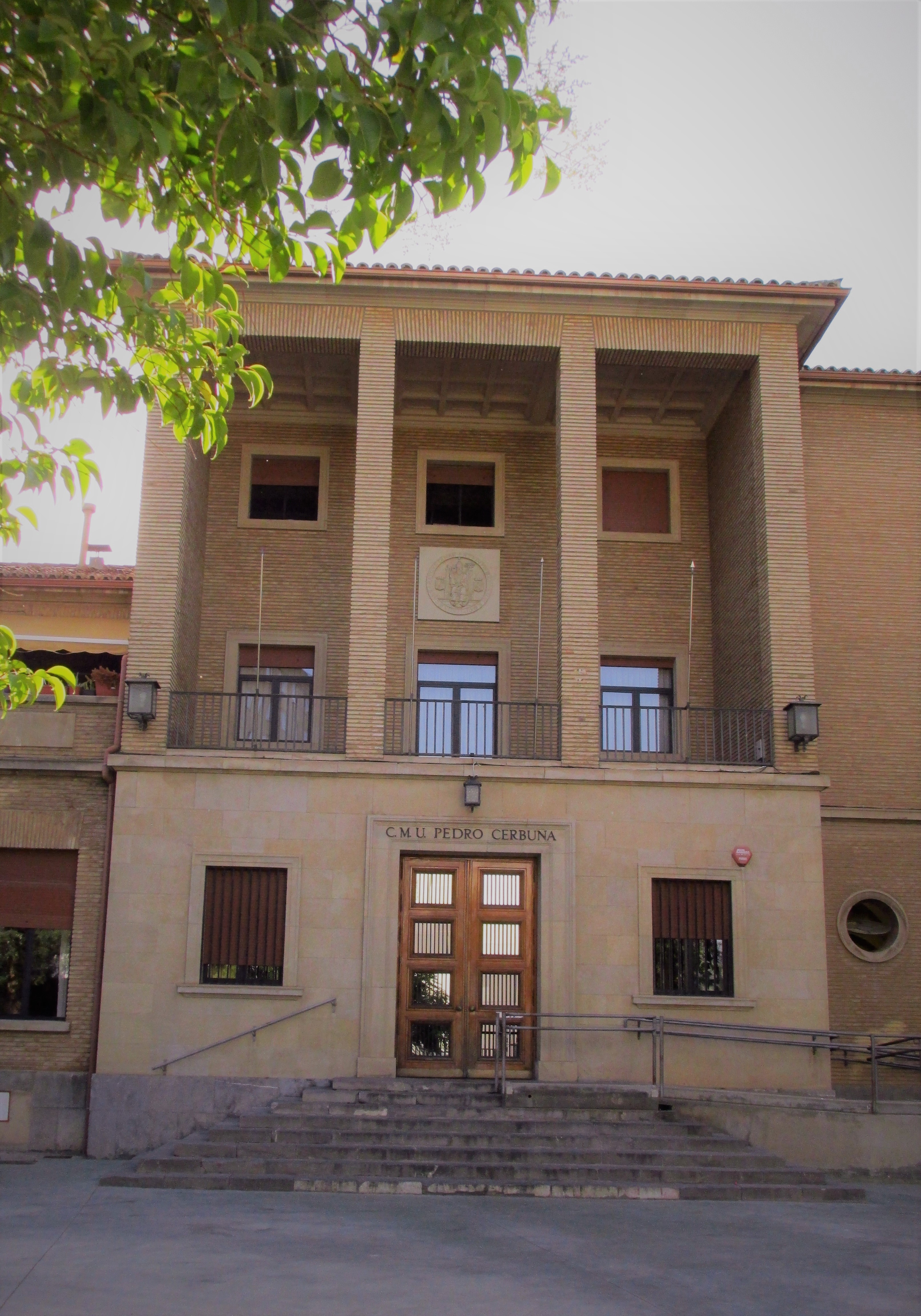
Colegio Mayor Universitario Pedro Cerbuna

There are six colleges at the Zaragoza campus of the University of Zaragoza:

- Colegio Mayor Universitario Cardenal Xavierre
- Colegio Mayor Universitario La Anunciata
- Colegio Mayor Universitario Miraflores
- Colegio Mayor Universitario Peñalba
- Colegio Mayor Universitario Virgen del Carmen
- Colegio Mayor Universitario Pedro Cerbuna

There is one college on the Huesca campus:

- Colegio Mayor Universitario Ramón Acín

There is one college on the Teruel campus:

- Colegio Mayor Universitario Pablo Serrano

== Taiwan ==
=== National Tsing Hua University ===
There is one college at National Tsing Hua University:

- Tsing Hua Residential College

== Thailand ==
=== King Mongkut's University of Technology Thonburi ===
There is one residential college at King Mongkut's University of Technology Thonburi:

- Residential College at KMUTT Ratchaburi Learning Park

== United Kingdom ==
British universities divide into collegiate universities where every student is a member of a college and non-collegiate universities that do not have residential colleges. The collegiate universities define the status of their colleges in their constitutional documents (i.e., their charter, statutes, ordinances, or articles of association).

=== University of Cambridge ===
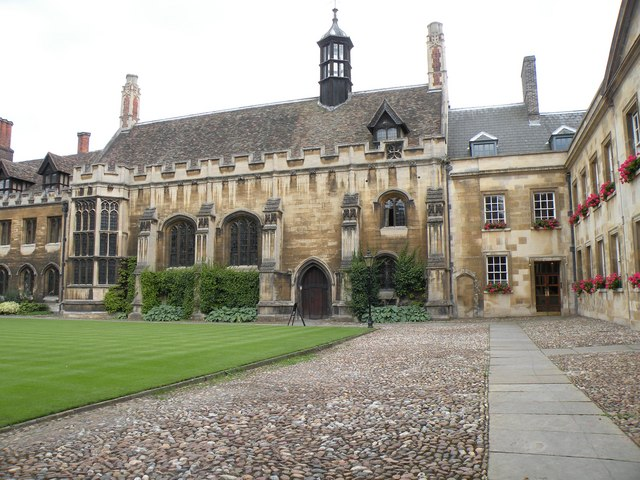
The hall of Peterhouse, the oldest collegiate building in Cambridge

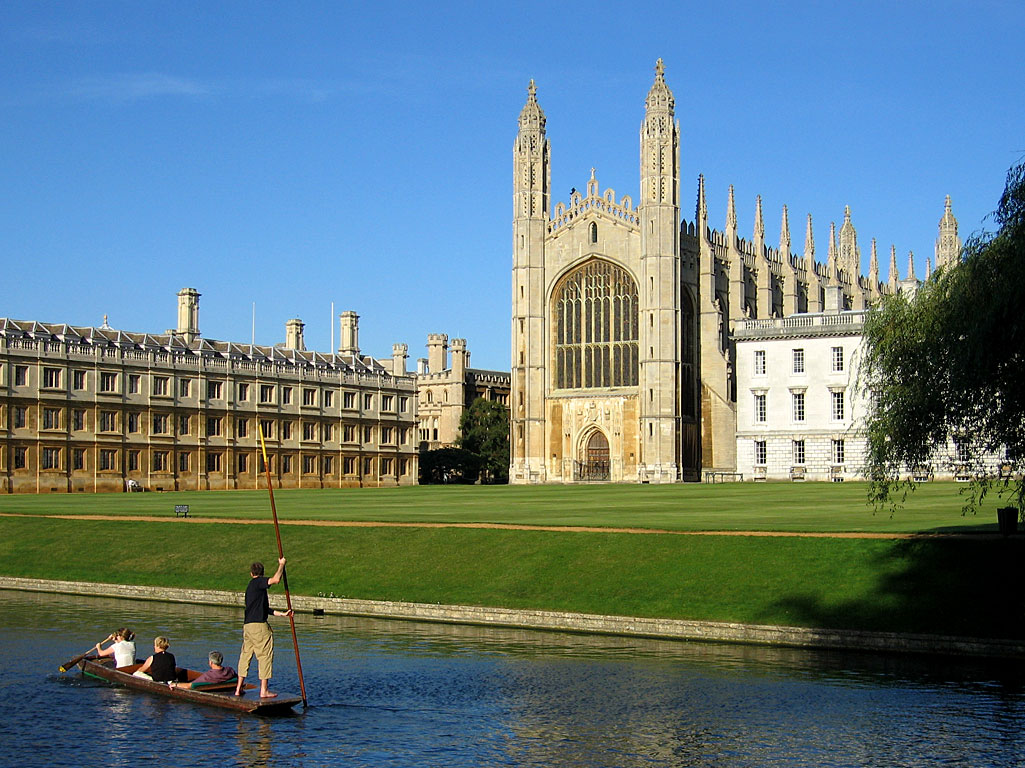
Clare College (left) and part of King's College, including King's College Chapel (centre)

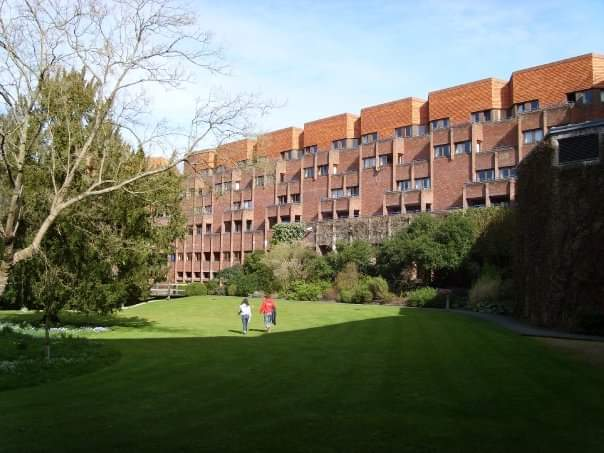
Robinson College, the newest Cambridge college

The University of Cambridge has 31 colleges, with the oldest dating back to the 13th century. All undergraduate and postgraduate students are members of a college.

- Christ's College
- Churchill College
- Clare College
- Clare Hall (postgraduate only)
- Corpus Christi College
- Darwin College (postgraduate only)
- Downing College
- Emmanuel College
- Fitzwilliam College
- Girton College
- Gonville and Caius College
- Homerton College
- Hughes Hall ‡
- Jesus College
- King's College
- Lucy Cavendish College
- Magdalene College
- Murray Edwards College (women only)
- Newnham College (women only)
- Pembroke College
- Peterhouse
- Queens' College
- Robinson College
- St Catharine's College
- St Edmund's College ‡
- St John's College
- Selwyn College
- Sidney Sussex College
- Trinity College
- Trinity Hall
- Wolfson College ‡

‡ Mature and postgraduate students only

=== Durham University ===
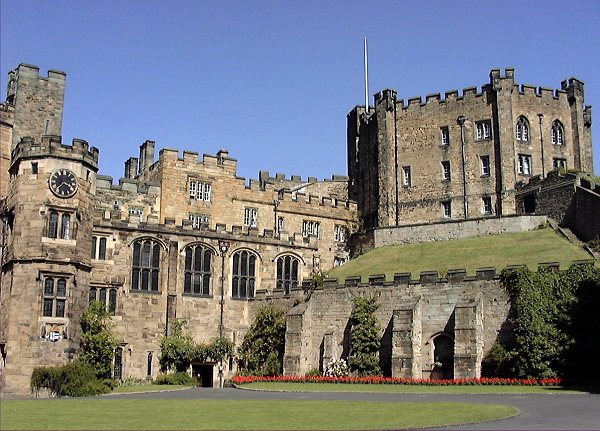
University College, the oldest college at Durham University

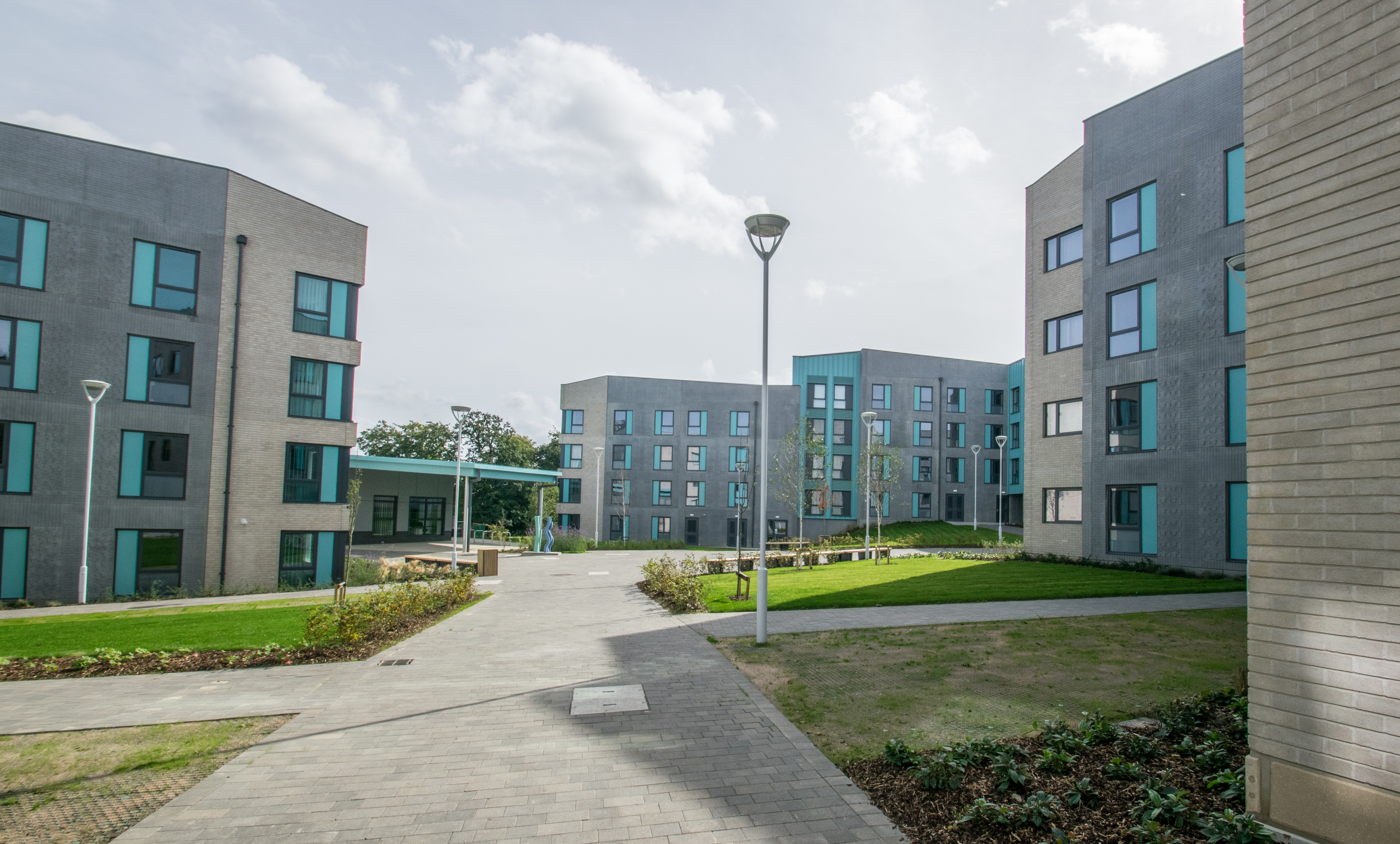
South College, the newest college at Durham University

There are 17 colleges (including one postgraduate-only college) at Durham University, with the oldest dating back to 1832. Two are independent "recognised colleges" while the others are university-owned "maintained colleges". The university has also announced plans to add two more colleges. All students are members of a college.

- Collingwood College
- Grey College
- Hatfield College
- John Snow College
- Josephine Butler College
- St Aidan's College
- St Chad's College (recognised college)
- St Cuthbert's Society
- College of St Hild and St Bede
- St John's College (recognised college)
- St Mary's College
- South College
- Stephenson College
- Trevelyan College
- University College
- Ustinov College (postgraduate only)
- Van Mildert College

=== Lancaster University ===
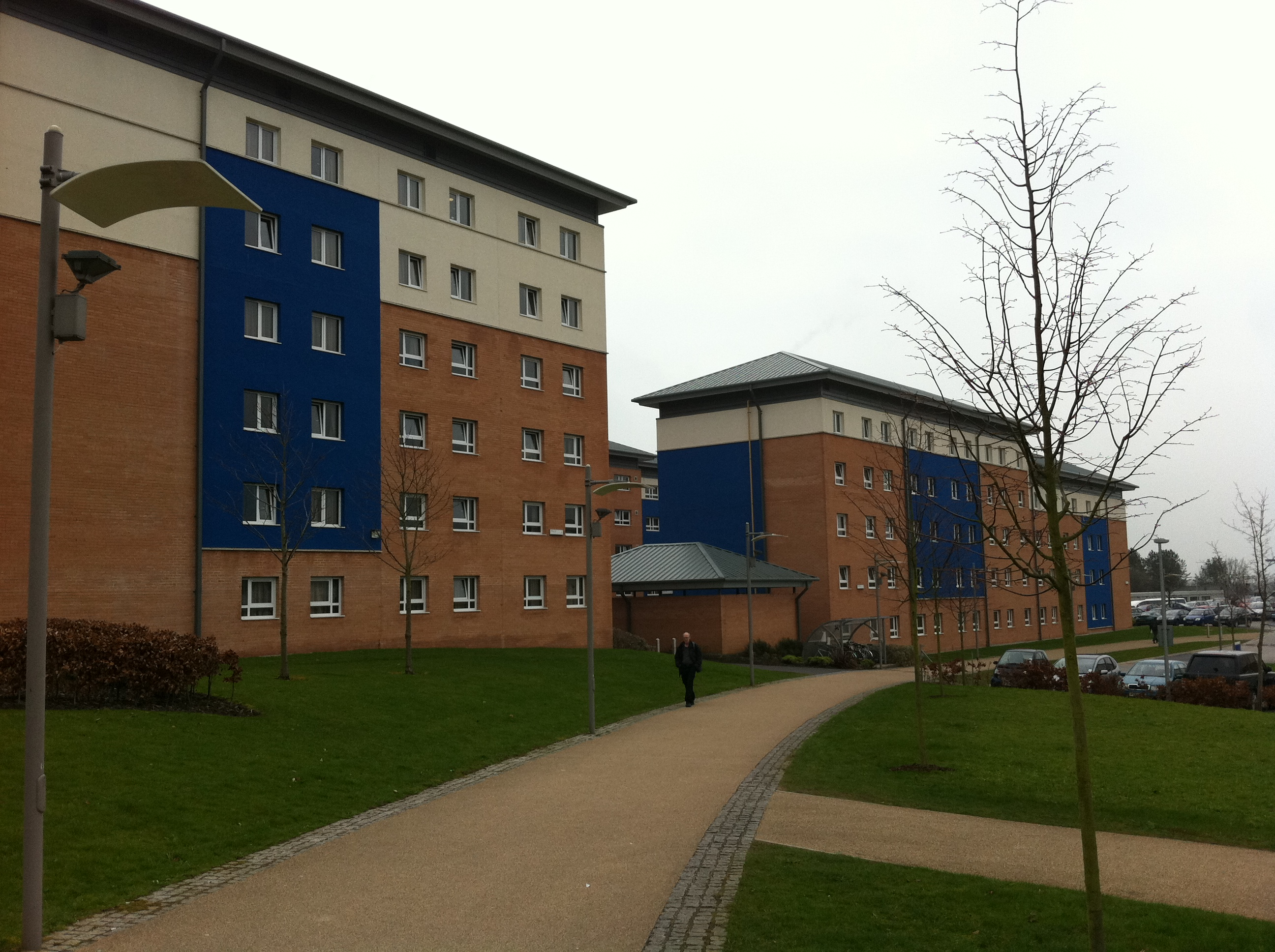
Fylde College, Lancaster

There are nine colleges (including one postgraduate-only college) at Lancaster University. Every student is a member of a college.

- Bowland College
- Cartmel College
- The County College
- Furness College
- Fylde College
- Graduate College (postgraduate only)
- Grizedale College
- Lonsdale College
- Pendle College

=== University of Oxford ===
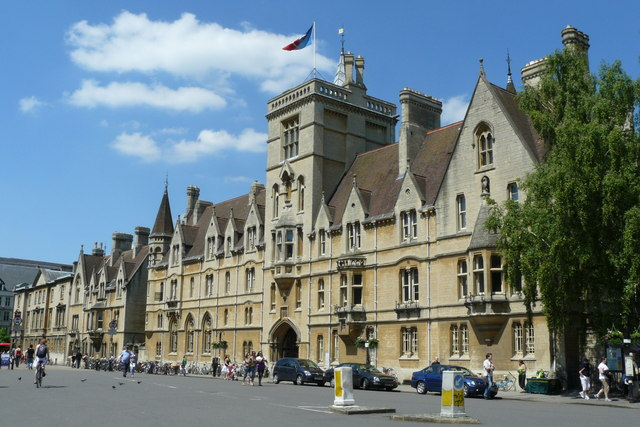
Balliol College

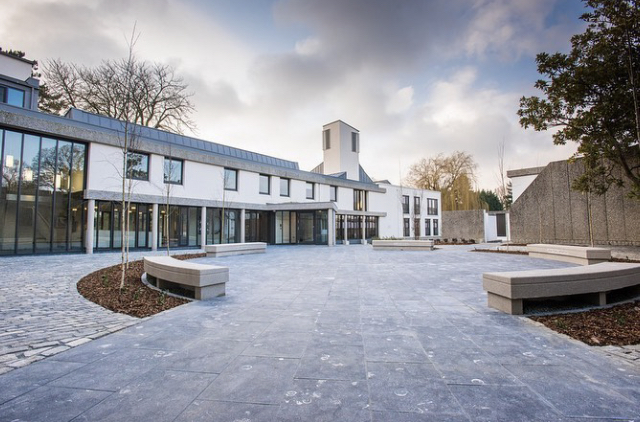
Wolfson College

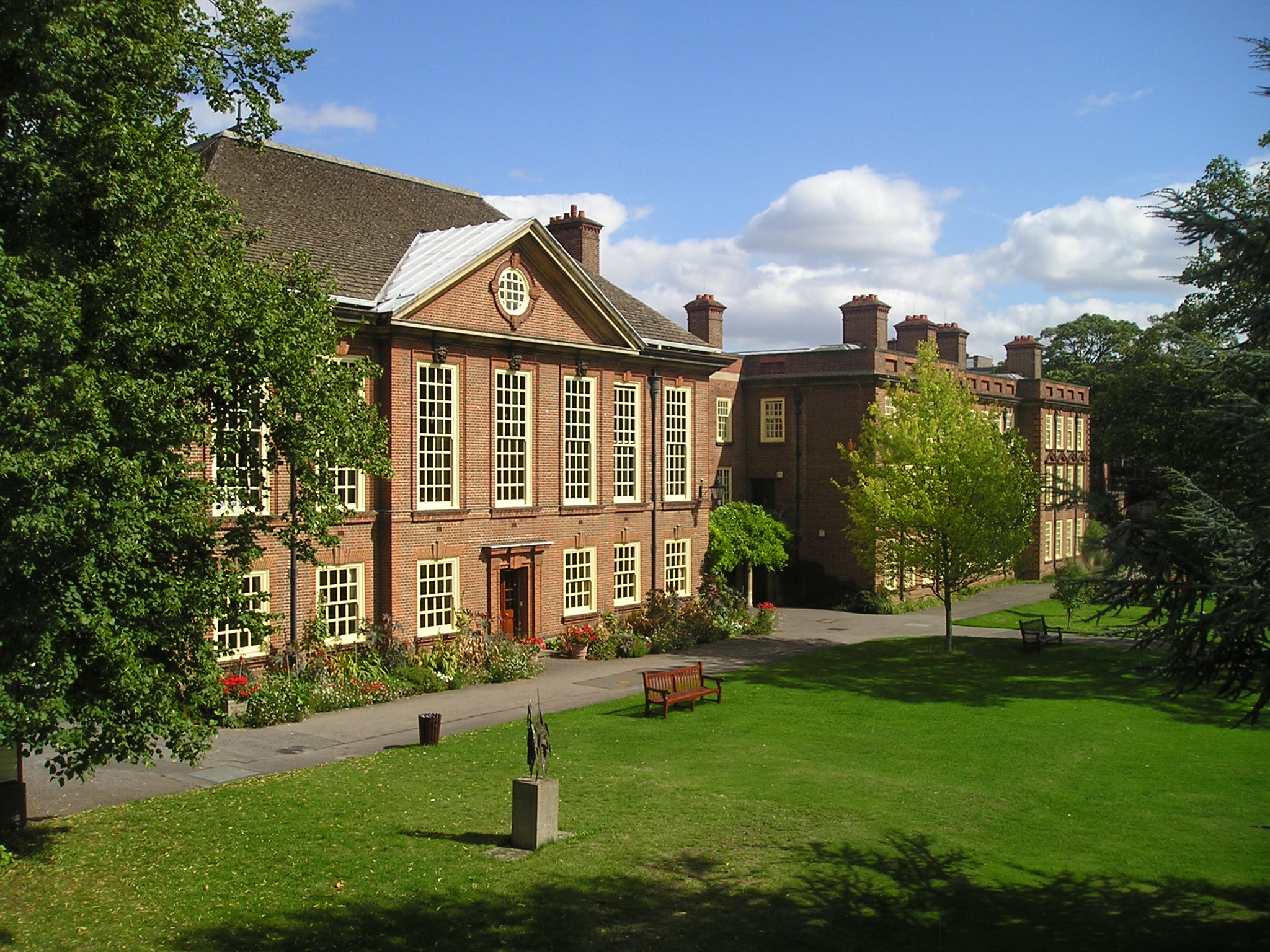
Somerville College

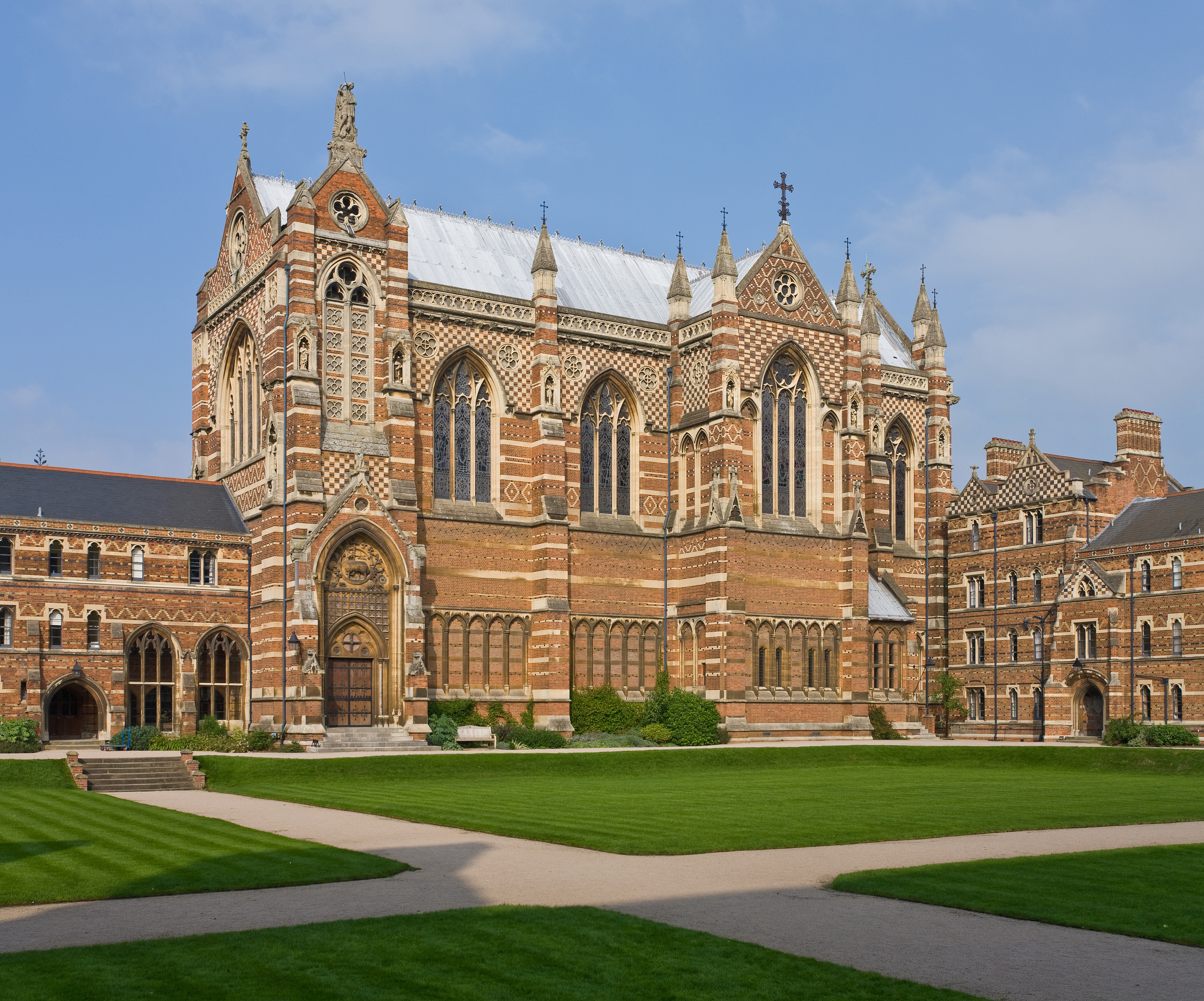
Keble College Chapel

The University of Oxford has 36 colleges, three societies (colleges owned by the university) and four permanent private halls (PPH). All undergraduate students and matriculated graduate students are members of a college.

- All Souls College (does not accept postgraduate or undergraduate students)
- Balliol College
- Blackfriars Hall (PPH)
- Brasenose College
- Campion Hall (PPH; postgraduate only)
- Christ Church
- Corpus Christi College
- Exeter College
- Green Templeton College (postgraduate only)
- Harris Manchester College
- Hertford College
- Jesus College
- Keble College
- Kellogg College (society; postgraduate only)
- Lady Margaret Hall
- Linacre College (postgraduate only)
- Lincoln College
- Magdalen College
- Mansfield College
- Merton College
- New College
- Nuffield College (postgraduate only)
- Oriel College
- Pembroke College
- The Queen's College
- Regent's Park College (PPH)
- Reuben College (society; postgraduate only)
- St Anne's College
- St Antony's College (postgraduate only)
- St Benet's Hall
- St Catherine's College
- St Cross College (society; postgraduate only)
- St Edmund Hall
- St Hilda's College
- St Hugh's College
- St John's College
- St Peter's College
- St Stephen's House
- Somerville College
- Trinity College
- University College
- Wadham College
- Wolfson College (postgraduate only)
- Worcester College
- Wycliffe Hall (PPH)

=== University of Roehampton ===
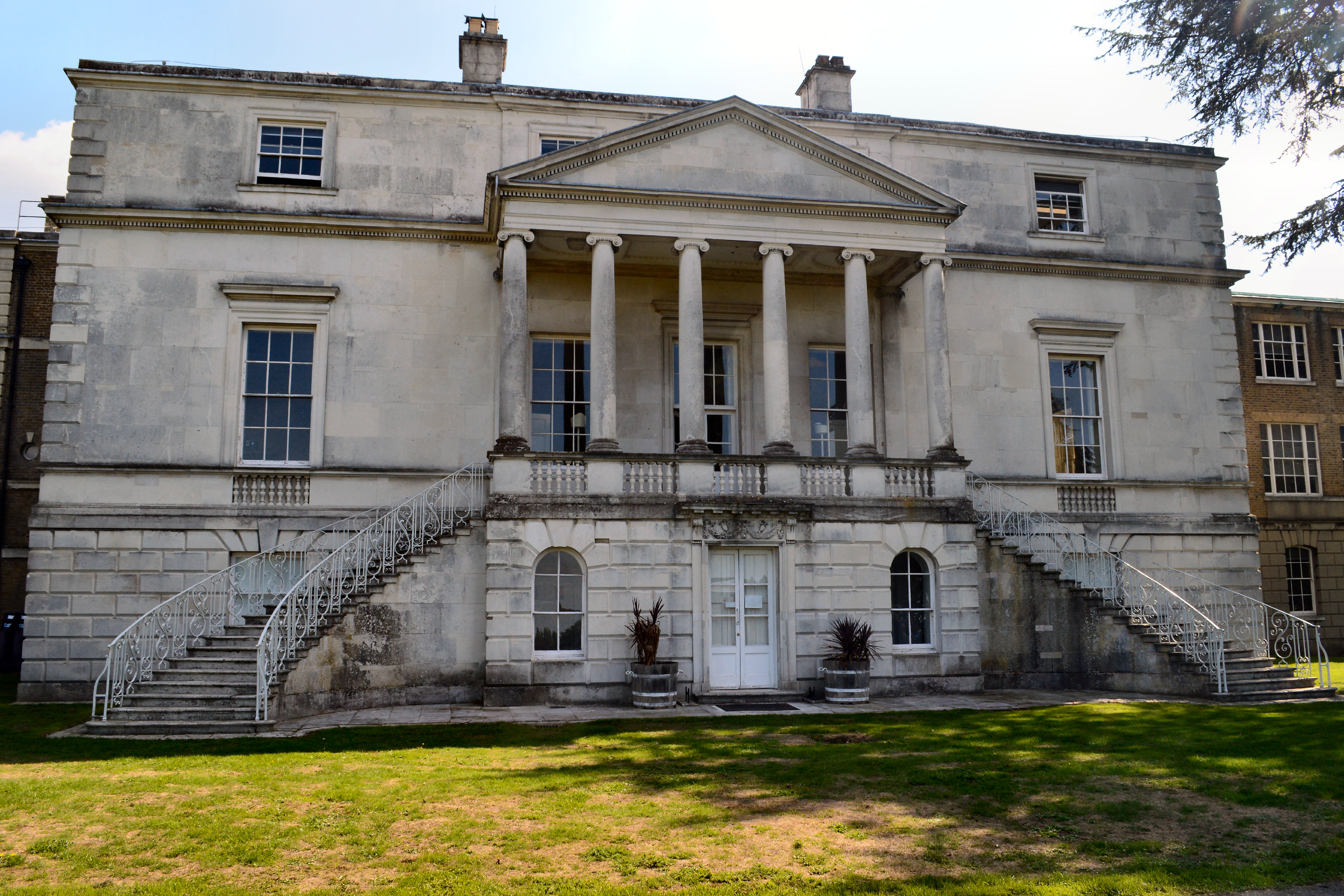
Whitelands College

There are four constituent colleges, all founded in the 19th century, that federated to form the University of Roehampton and continue as colleges within the university. All students are members of a college.

- Digby Stuart College
- Froebel College
- Southlands College
- Whitelands College

=== University of York ===
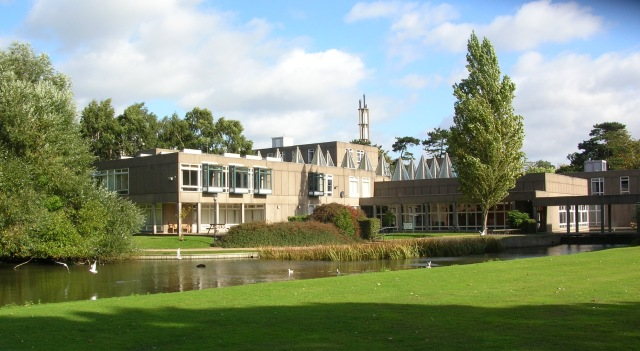
Derwent College, York

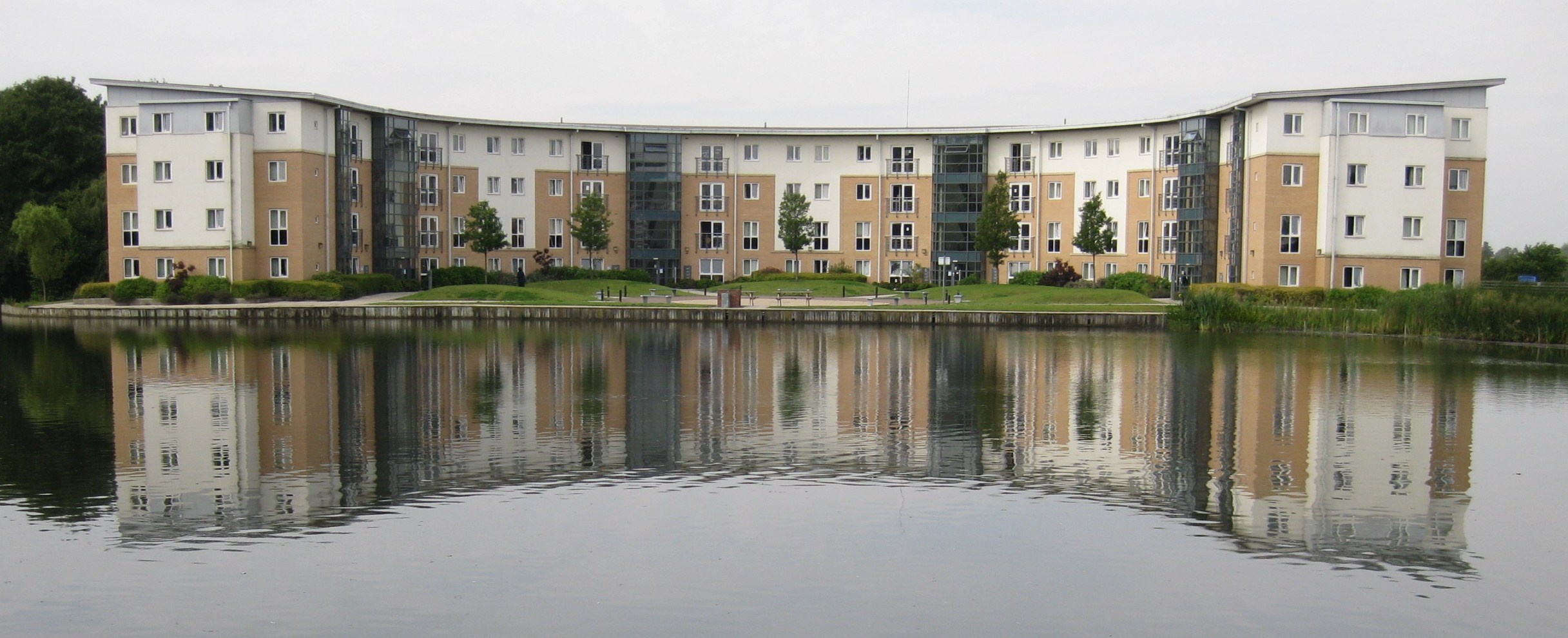
Wentworth College, York

There are eleven colleges at the University of York, including one postgraduate-only college, and all students are members of a college.

- Alcuin College
- Anne Lister College
- Constantine College
- David Kato College
- Derwent College
- Goodricke College
- Halifax College
- James College
- Langwith College
- Vanbrugh College
- Wentworth College (postgraduate only)

== United States ==
There are a wide variety of residential college systems in the United States, although none that completely follow the British model of having all students (undergraduate and postgraduate) be members of a college. Residential college provision is primarily undergraduate, with Princeton being a rare example of a university with a graduate residential college. There are a number of universities that are fully collegiate at the undergraduate level, but many others that offer a small number of residential colleges alongside other residential options, or restrict residential colleges to first year students, or to second year and above.

=== Northeast ===
==== Binghamton University ====
Binghamton University has six residential communities, four of which are identified as colleges:

- College-In-The-Woods
- Hinman College
- Mountainview College
- Newing College

==== Colgate University ====
Colgate University has four residential commons based on the residential college model. All undergraduate students live in one of the commons for their first two years.

- Brown Commons
- Cicone Commons
- Dart Colegrave Commons
- Hancock Commons

==== Cornell University ====
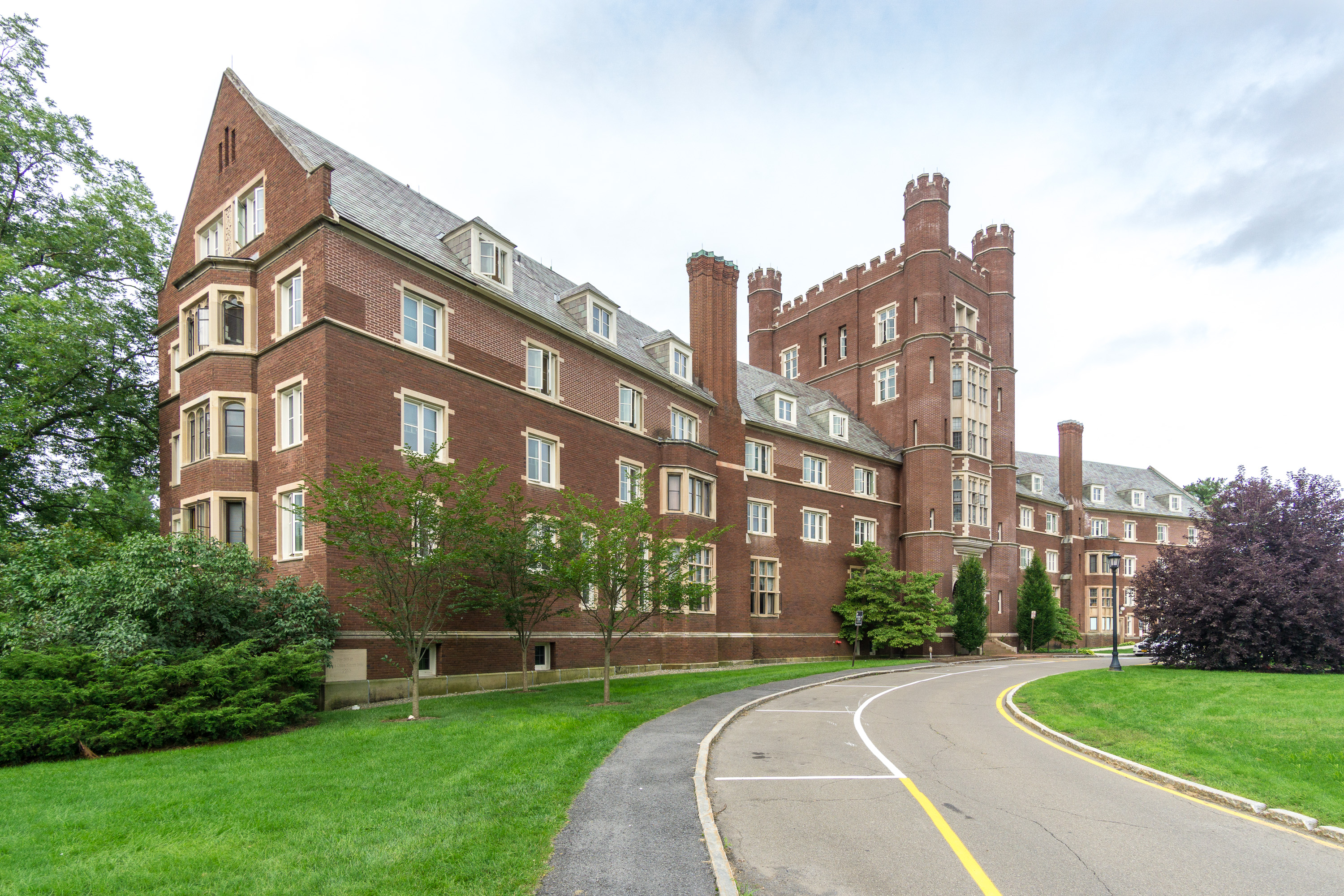
Risley Residential College, built in 1913 as a women's hall of residence

Cornell University has a variety of housing options, including residences halls, program houses (themed residence halls) and co-op houses. Two of the program houses (for second years and above) are identified as residential colleges:

- Risley Residential College
- Ujamaa Residential College

The houses of the West Campus House System have also been identified by the university as a "residential college initiative", again for second year and above.

- Carl Becker House
- Hans Bethe House
- Alice Cook House
- William Keeton House
- Flora Rose House

==== Dartmouth College ====
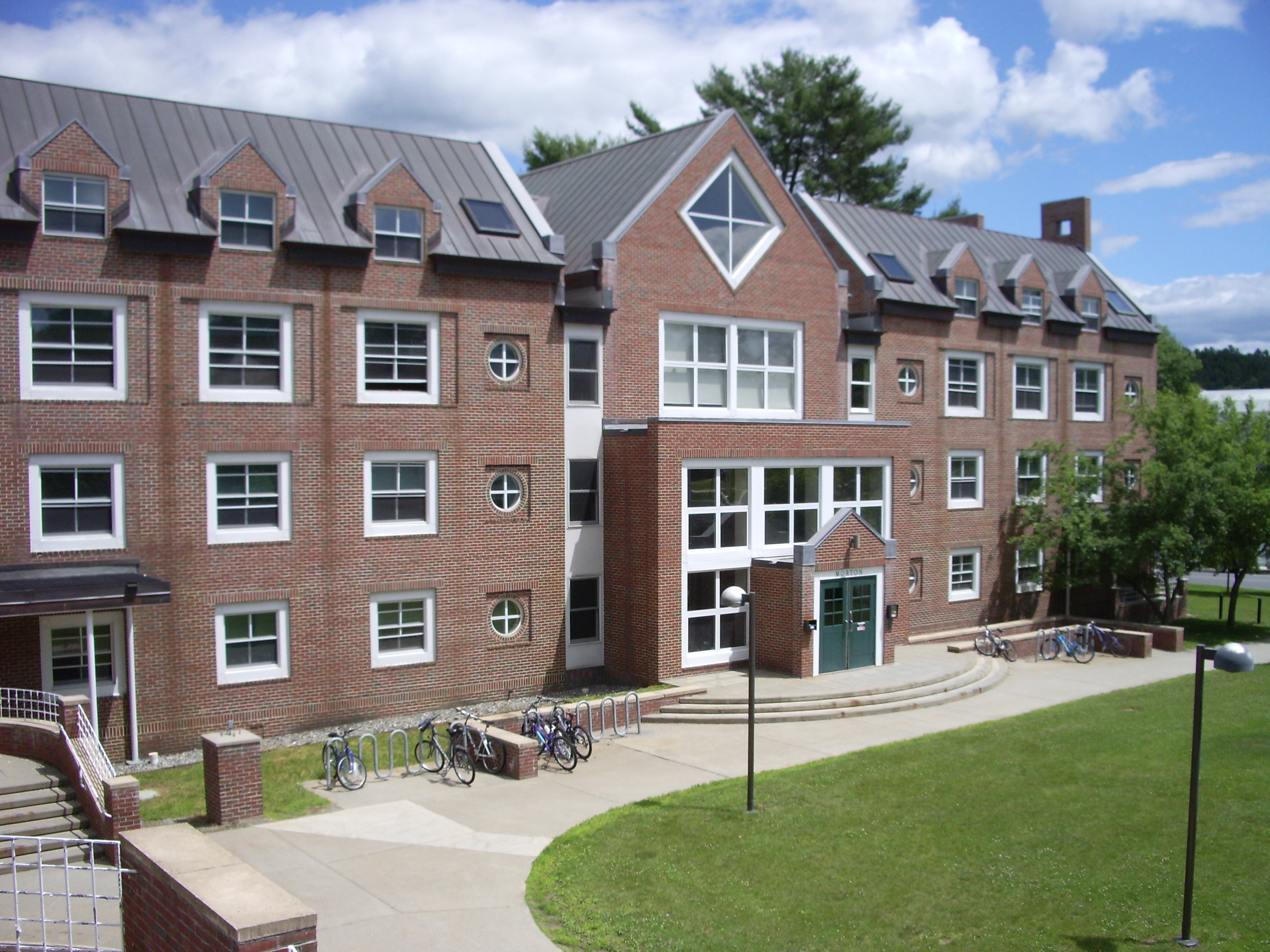
Morton Hall at East Wheelock House

Dartmouth College has six houses in its house system and all undergraduate students are members of a house while academic staff, other staff and graduate students can request affiliation:

- Allen House
- East Wheelock House
- North Park House
- School House
- South House
- West House

==== Fairfield University ====
Fairfield University has three sophomore residential colleges that offer both residence and academic programmes to sophomore (second year) students:

- Service for Justice Residential College
- Ignatian Leadership Residential College
- Creative Life Residential College

==== Fordham University ====
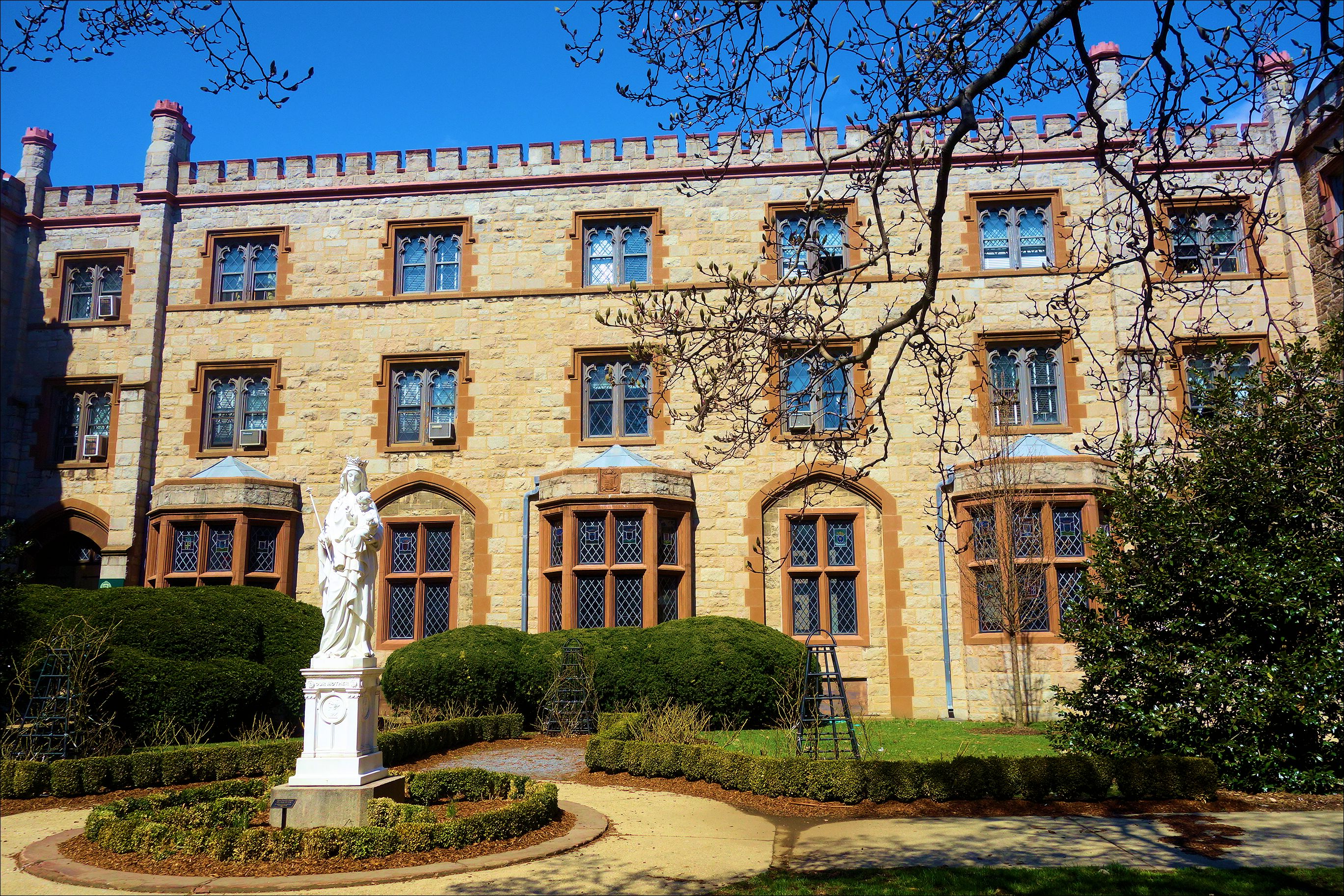
Queen's Court Residential College

Fordham University has a number of integrated learning communities, divided into first year and upper classes. Two of the first year communities and one of the upper class communities are identified as residential colleges.

First year residential colleges:

- Loyola Residential College and the Manresa Program
- Queen's Court Residential College

Upper class residential colleges:

- Campbell and Salice-Conley Residential College

==== Franklin & Marshall College ====
Franklin & Marshall College has five college houses:

- Bonchek College House
- Brooks College House
- Roschel College House
- Ware College House
- Weis College House

==== Harvard University ====
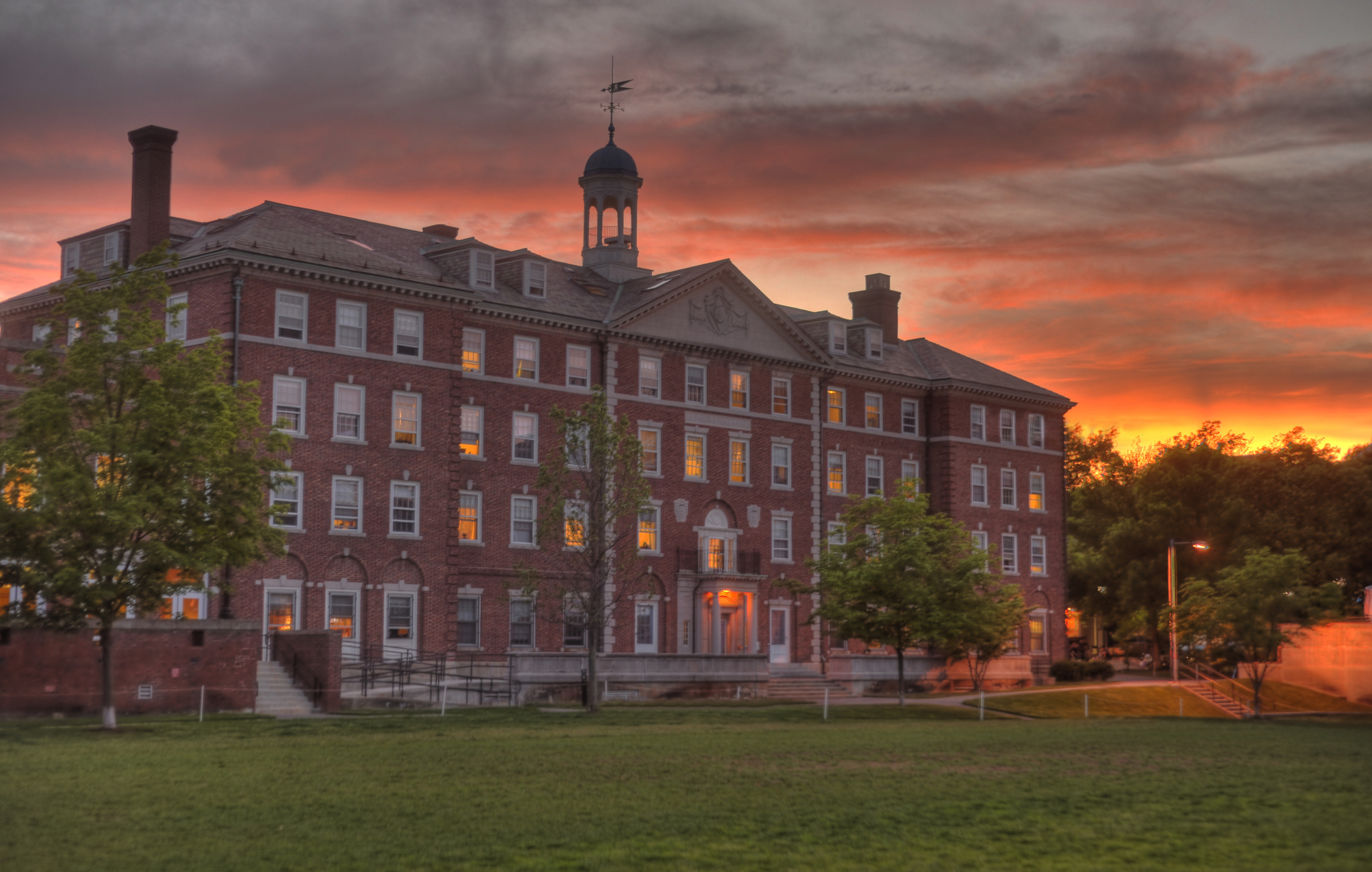
Cabot House on the Radcliffe Quadrangle

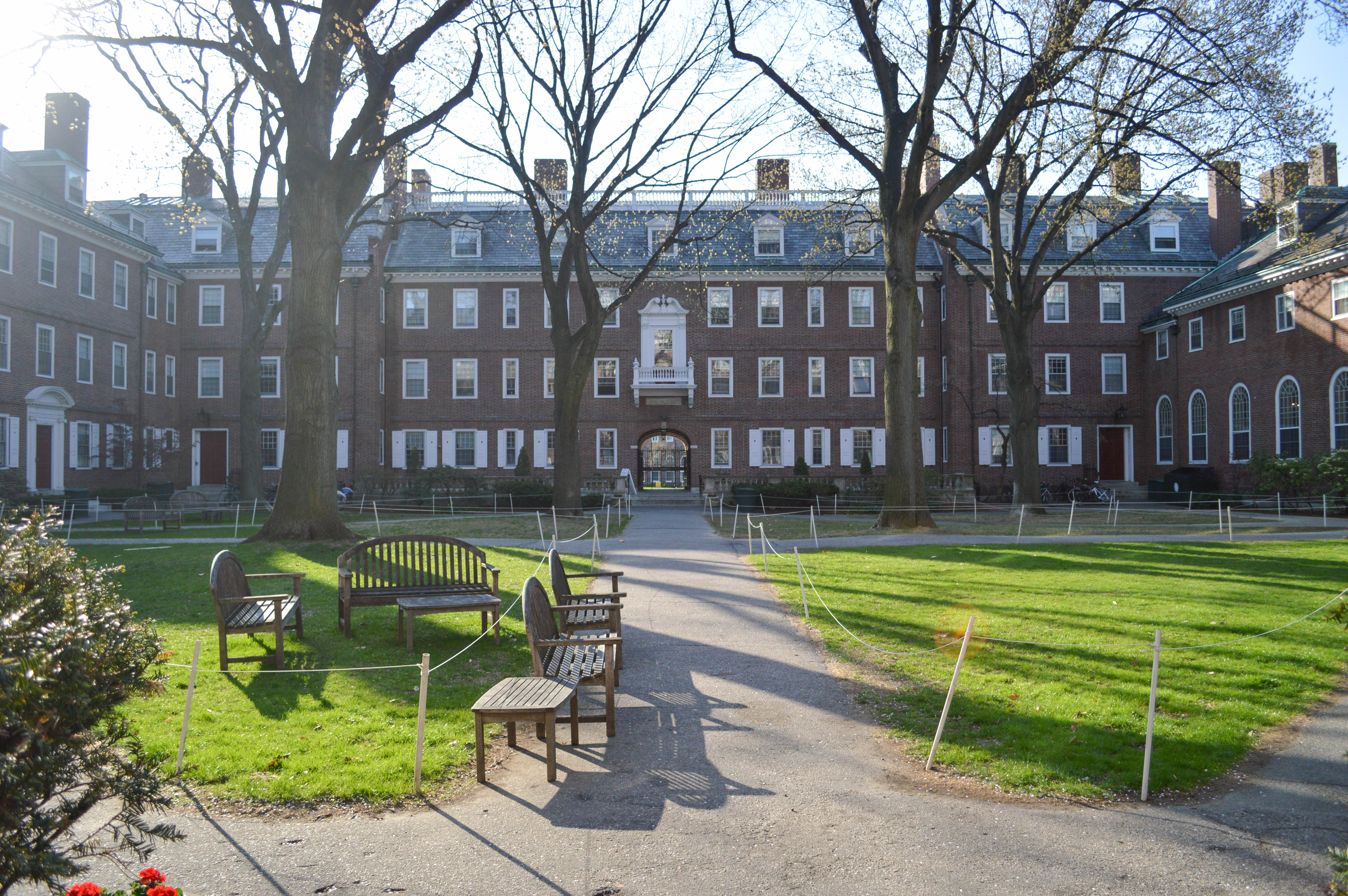
Kirkland House, one of the "river houses" near the Charles River

Harvard University's house system covers upper-level students (beyond the first year). There are twelve residential houses, or upper class students can chose to join the Dudley Community for non-residential students and students resident in the Dudley co-op:

- Adams House
- Cabot House
- Currier House
- Dunster House
- Eliot House
- Kirkland House
- Leverett House
- Lowell House
- Mather House
- Pforzheimer House
- Quincy House
- Winthrop House

==== New York University ====
New York University has two residential college for first year students, among a variety of other housing options:

- The Residential College at the Paulson Center
- The Residential College at Othmer Hall

==== Princeton University ====
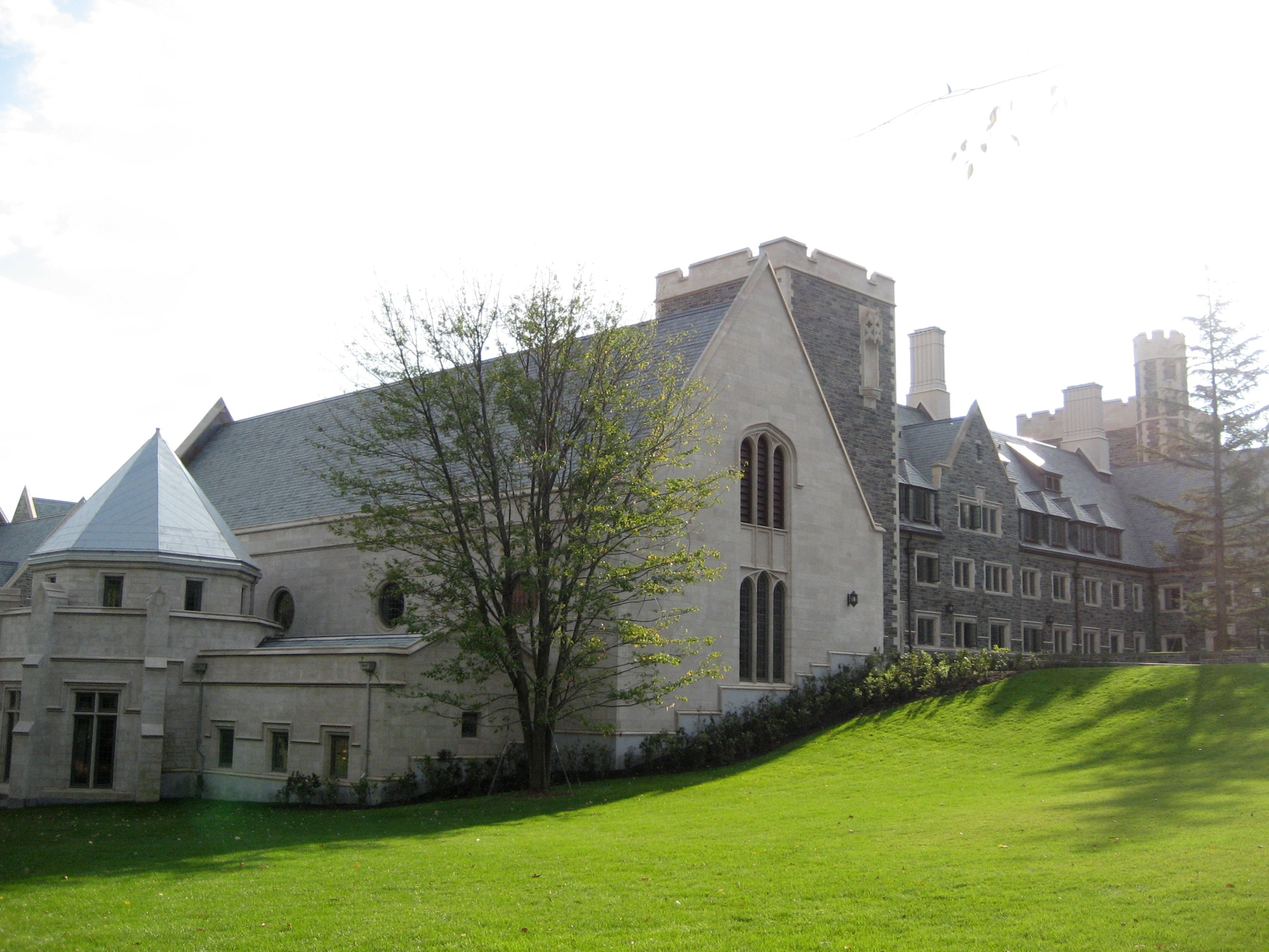
21st century Collegiate Gothic architecture at Whitman College

Princeton University has seven undergraduate colleges and one for postgraduate students. All undergraduates are members of a college, while the Graduate College is one of a variety of options for graduate students, which also include applying to be a resident graduate student in one of the undergraduate colleges.

- Butler College
- Forbes College
- Graduate College (postgraduate)
- Huo College
- Mathey College
- Rockefeller College
- Whitman College
- Yeh College

==== Rutgers University ====
Rutgers University had a single residential college:

- Douglass Residential College (women only)

==== Yale University ====
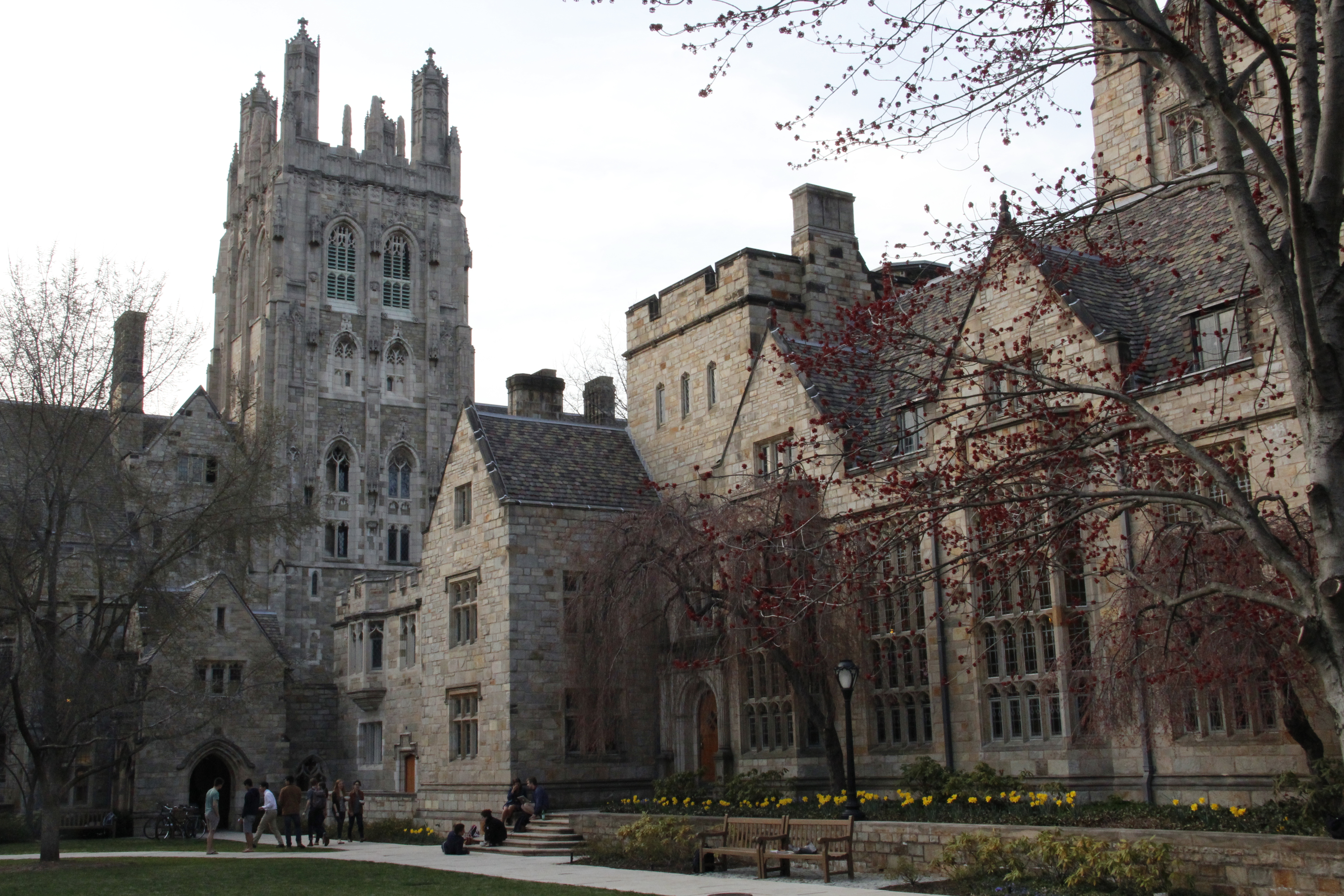
Collegiate Gothic architecture at Branford College

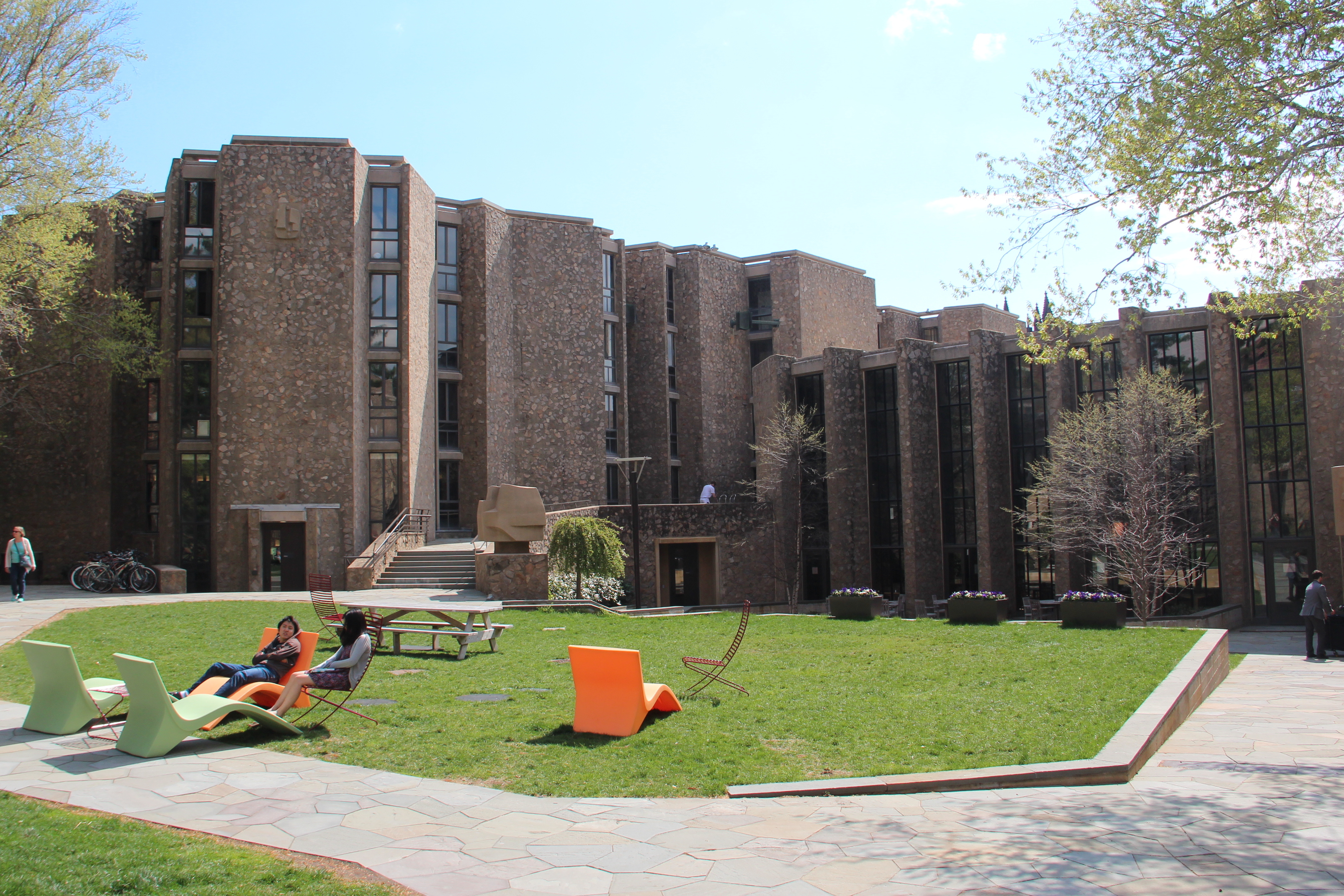
Modern architecture at Morse College

Yale University has 14 residential colleges and all undergraduates belong to a college. Graduate students may apply to be non-residential members of a college through the graduate affiliate program.

- Benjamin Franklin College
- Berkeley College
- Branford College
- Davenport College
- Ezra Stiles College
- Grace Hopper College
- Jonathan Edwards College
- Morse College
- Pauli Murray College
- Pierson College
- Saybrook College
- Silliman College
- Timothy Dwight College
- Trumbull College

=== Midwest ===
==== Central Michigan University ====
Central Michigan University has a number of themed "Living Learning Communities and Residential Colleges", six of which are identified as residential colleges:

- Business Residential College
- Education and Human Services Residential College
- Health Professions Residential College
- Public Service Residential College
- School of Music Residential College
- Science and Engineering Residential College

==== University of Michigan, Ann Arbor ====
The University of Michigan, Ann Arbor, has one residential college:

- Residential College

==== Michigan State University ====
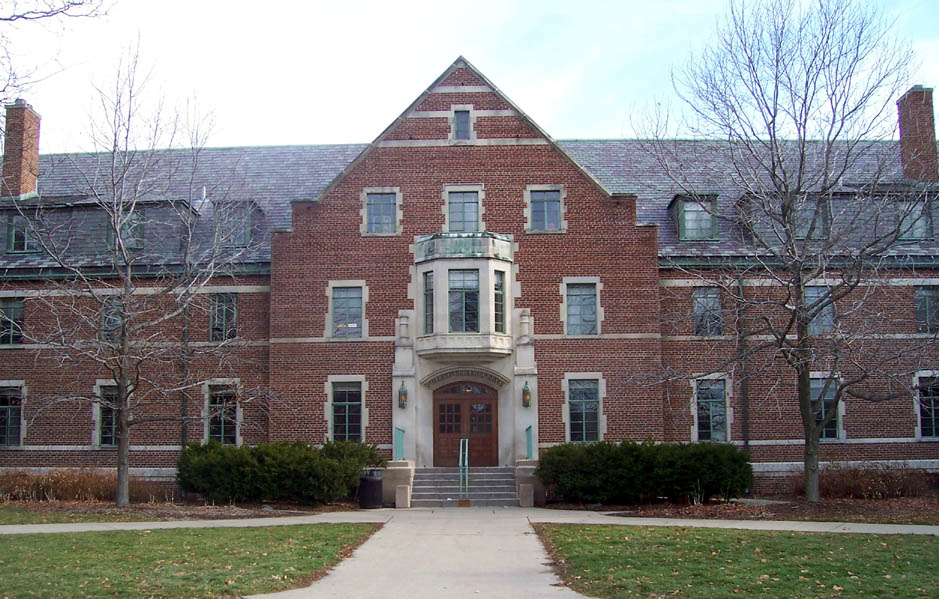
Snyder-Phillips Hall, the location of the Residential College in the Arts and Humanities

Michigan State University has three themed residential colleges.

- James Madison College (public affairs and public policy)
- Lyman Briggs College (interdisciplinary studies and sciences
- Residential College in the Arts and Humanities (arts and humanities)

==== Northwestern University ====
Northwestern University has ten themed undergraduate residential colleges, along with other residential options.

- 2303 Sheridan – Residential College of Cultural and Community Studies
- Ayers Hall – Residential College of Commerce and Industry
- Chapin Hall – Humanities Residential College
- East Fairchild – Communications Residential College
- Hobart House – Women's Residential College
- North Mid-Quads – Public Affairs Residential College
- South Mid-Quads – Shepard Residential College
- Slivka Hall – Residential College of Science and Engineering
- West Fairchild – International Studies Residential College
- Willard Hall – Willard Residential College

==== University of Notre Dame ====
The University of Notre Dame residence halls have some elements of a residential college system.

=== South ===
==== Appalachian State University ====
Appalachian State University has ten residential learning communities, one of which is identified as being a residential college:

- Watauga Residential College

==== Baylor University ====
Baylor University has a mix of residential communities, including four residential colleges:

- Alexander Hall
- Brooks Residential College
- Memorial Hall
- Teal Hall

==== University of Georgia ====
The University of Georgia has a number of 'living learning communities', including one identified as a residential college, associated with the Franklin College of Arts and Sciences:

- Franklin Residential College

==== Louisiana State University ====
Louisiana State University offers ten themed residential colleges, bringing together first year students with similar majors, among its housing options. Upper class students live in campus apartments.

- Agriculture Residential College
- Business Residential College
- Honors House
- Human Sciences and Education Residential College
- Humanities and Social Sciences Residential College
- Mass Communications Residential College
- ROTC Pentagon Community
- Science Residential College
- Visual and Performing Arts Residential College

==== Murray State University ====
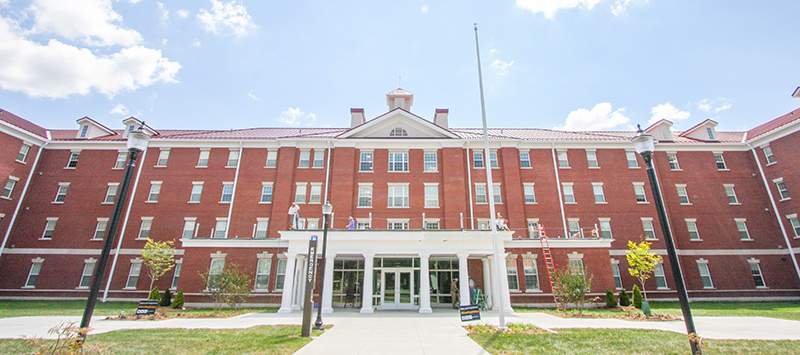
HC Franklin residence hall of Springer-Franklin College

Murray State University has eight residential colleges. All undergraduate students living on campus join a college.

- Clark College
- Elizabeth College
- Hart College
- Hester College
- Regents College
- Richmond College
- Springer-Franklin College
- RH White College

==== University of Miami ====
The University of Miami has five residential colleges among its housing options:

- Coral Residential College
- Eaton Residential College
- Ibis Residential College
- Mahoney Residential College
- Pearson Residential College

==== University of Mississippi ====
The University of Mississippi has two residential colleges:

- Residential College South
- Luckyday Residential College

==== University of North Carolina at Greensboro ====
The University of North Carolina at Greensboro has four residential colleges among a variety of housing options:

- Ashby Residential College
- North Spencer Residential College
- South Spencer Residential College
- Strong Residential College

==== University of Oklahoma ====
The University of Oklahoma has two residential colleges:

- Dunham College
- Headington College

==== Rice University ====
The rotunda at Martel College

There are 11 residential colleges at Rice University, with a 12th planned to open in 2026. All undergraduate students are assigned a college and remain part of that college throughout their time at the university.

- Baker College
- Brown College
- Chao College (opening 2026)
- Duncan College
- Hanszen College
- Jones College
- Lovett College
- Martel College
- McMurtry College
- Sid Richardson College
- Wiess College
- Will Rice College

==== University of South Carolina ====
The University of South Carolina has one residential college

- Preston Residential College for Leadership

==== Southern Arkansas University ====
Southern Arkansas University had one residential college:

- Residential College

==== Southern Methodist University ====
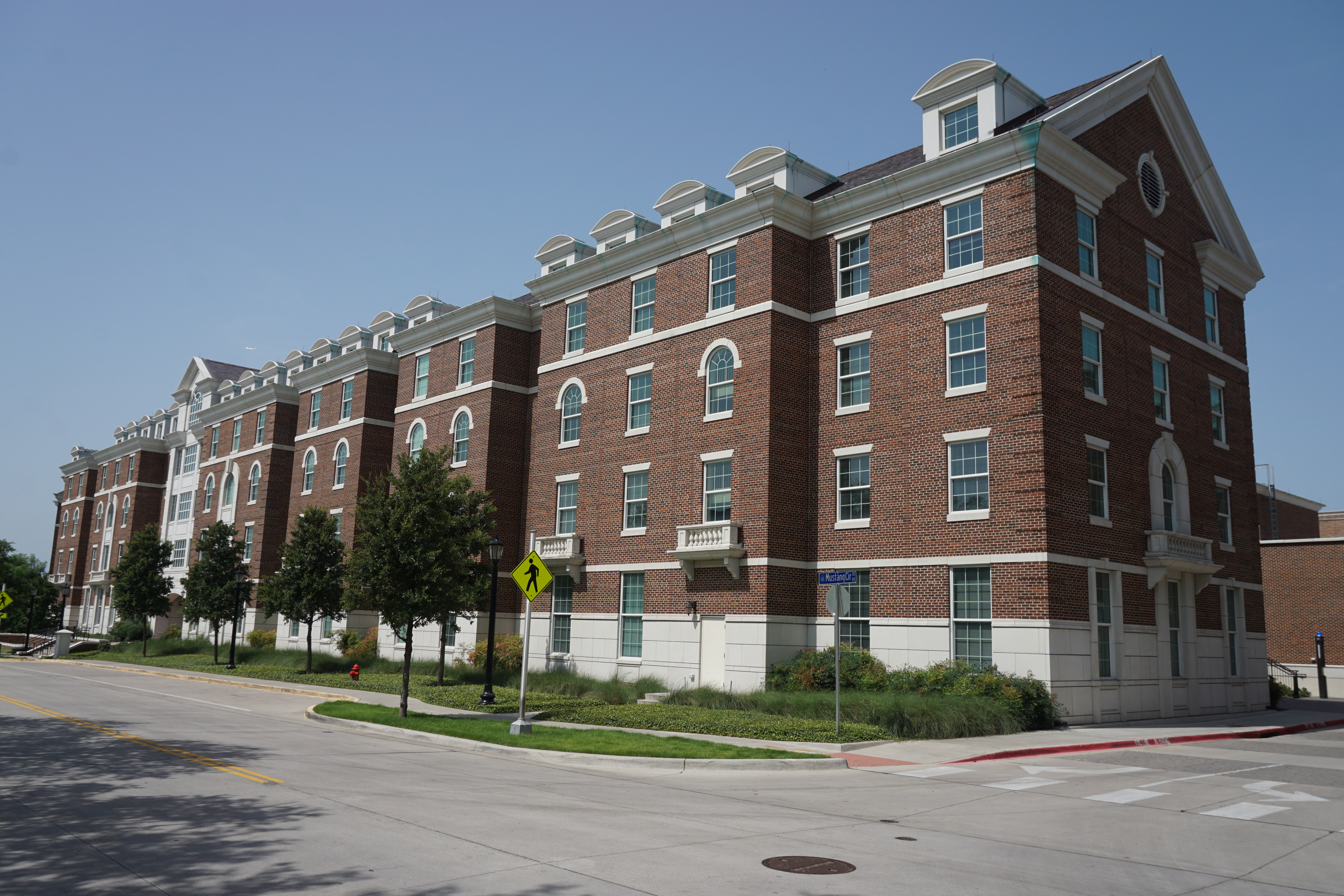
Loyd Commons

All undergraduate students are members of one of Southern Methodist University's 11 residential commons, which they refer to as their "implementation of the residential college system".

- Armstrong Commons
- Boaz Commons
- Cockrell-McIntosh Commons
- Crum Commons
- Kathy Crow Commons
- Loyd Commons
- Mary Hay/Peyton/Shuttles Commons
- McElvaney Commons
- Morrison-McGinnis Commons
- Virginia-Snider Commons
- Ware Commons

==== Tulane University ====
There is one residential college at Tulane University:

- Wall Residential College

==== Vanderbilt University ====
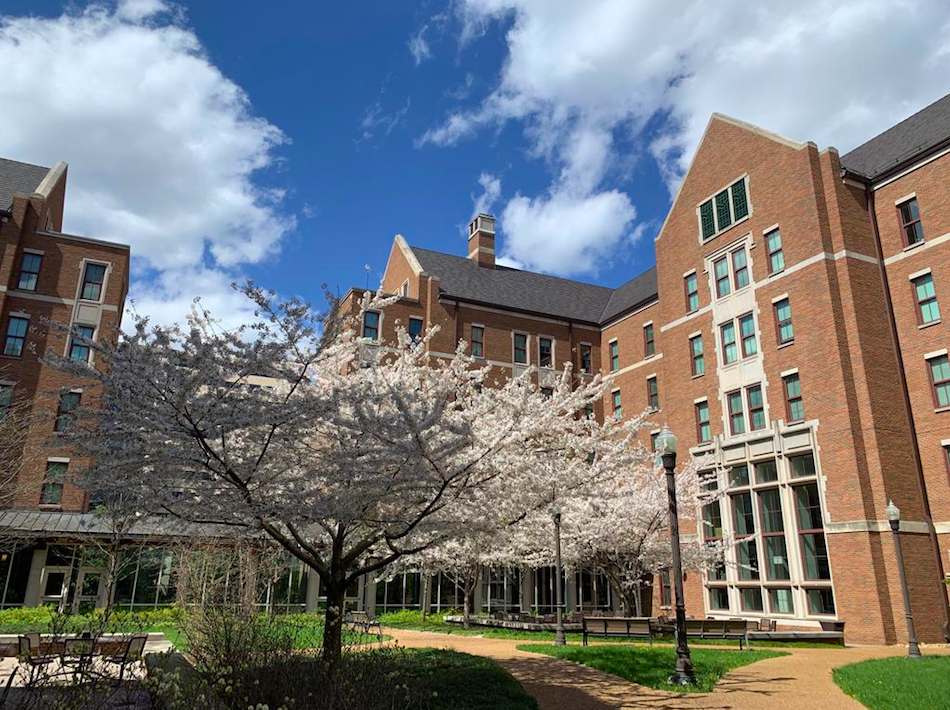
Warren College

Vanderbilt University has six residential colleges for undergraduate students past the first year.

- E. Bronson Ingram College
- Moore College
- Nicholas S. Zeppos College
- Oliver C. Carmichael College
- Rothschild College
- Warren College

==== University of Virginia ====
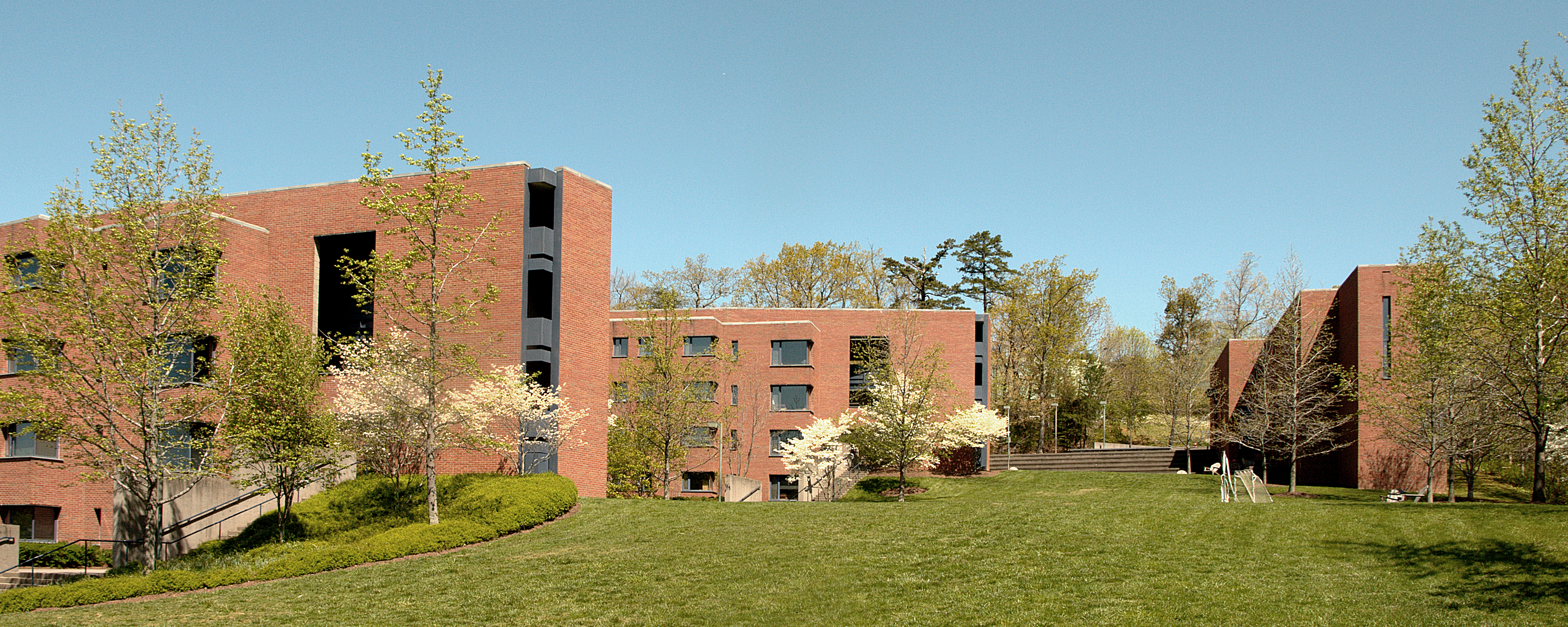
Hereford College

The University of Virginia has many forms of upper-class housing including traditional dormitories, apartment-style housing, language houses, and 3 residential colleges:

- Brown College at Monroe Hill
- Hereford College
- International Residential College

==== Virginia Tech ====
Virginia Tech has a number of living-learning programmes, three of which are considered residential colleges:

- Residential College at West Ambler Johnston
- Honors Residential College
- Leadership and Social Change College

=== West ===
==== California Institute of Technology ====
The California Institute of Technology (Caltech) runs a house system with eight undergraduate houses, as well as undergraduate and postgraduate residences not affiliated with houses:

- Avery House
- Lloyd House
- Page House
- Venerable House
- Blacker House
- Dabney House
- Fleming House
- Ricketts House

==== University of California, San Diego ====
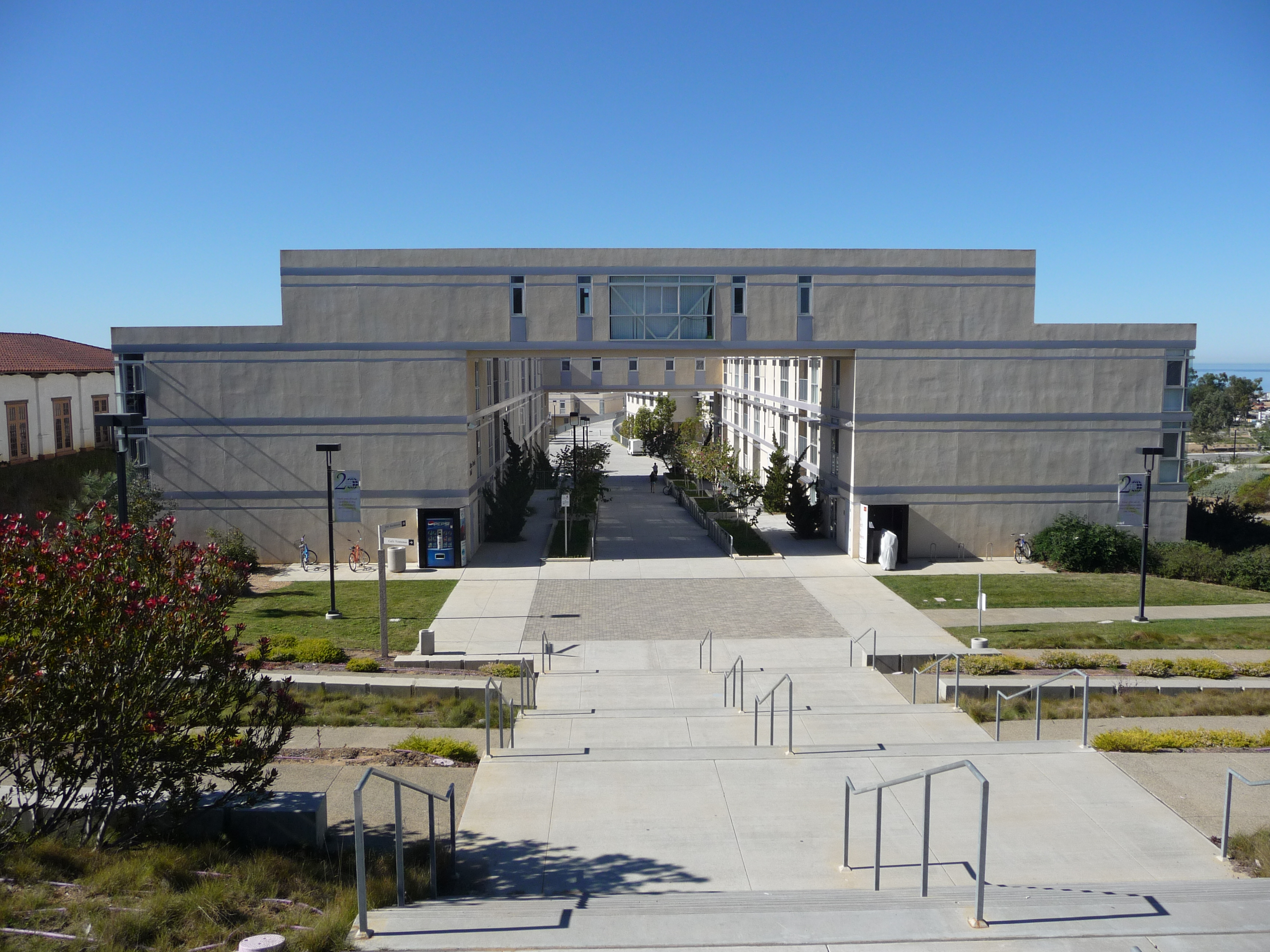
Mesa Verde Hall at Eleanor Roosevelt College

There are eight colleges at the University of California, San Diego, and all undergraduate students are assigned to a college.

- Earl Warren College
- Eighth College
- Eleanor Roosevelt College
- John Muir College
- Revelle College
- Seventh College
- Sixth College
- Thurgood Marshall College

==== University of California, Santa Cruz ====
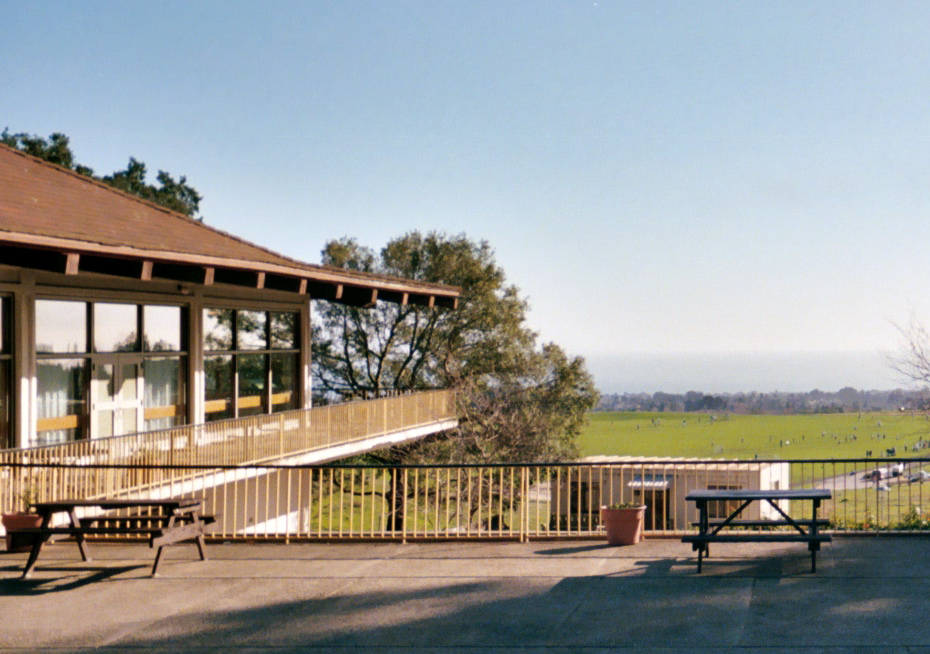
Cowell College

There are ten residential colleges at the University of California, Santa Cruz. All undergraduates are members of a college.

- College Nine
- Cowell College
- Crown College
- John R Lewis College
- Kresge College
- Merrill College
- Oakes College
- Porter College
- Rachel Carson College
- Stevenson College

==== University of California, Berkeley ====
There is one residential college at the University of California, Berkeley:

- Bowles Hall

== Universities by number of colleges ==
Universities with 12 or more colleges
Number of colleges	University name	Country
43	University of Oxford	United Kingdom
33	Complutense University of Madrid	Spain
31	University of Cambridge	United Kingdom
18	University of Pavia	Italy
17	Durham University	United Kingdom
14	University of Otago	New Zealand
14	Yale University	United States
12	Harvard University	United States
12	University of New South Wales	Australia
12	Yonsei University	South Korea
12	Rice University	United States
