= UCL =

UCL may refer to:

== Education ==
=== Universities ===
- University College London, a public university in England
- Université catholique de Louvain, a private university in Belgium
- UCL University College, a public university in Denmark

=== University libraries ===
- United College Library, of the Chinese University of Hong Kong
- Universities' Central Library, of the University of Yangon in Myanmar

== Sports ==
=== Association football (soccer) ===
- UEFA Champions League, an annual pan-European competition
- United Counties League, a league in England

== Other uses ==
- Ulnar collateral ligament, in anatomy
- Upper control limit, in statistics
- Union communiste libertaire, a French anarchist organisation
- Uganda Clays Limited, a building materials manufacturing company
