= James Ware (surgeon) =

British surgeon and educator (1941–2015)

James Ware (8 July 1941 – 9 October 2015) was a British surgeon and medical educator. He was affiliated with Karolinska Institute during the 1970s and 1980s, and later held professorships at the United Arab Emirates University, the International Medical University, the University of the Witwatersrand, the Chinese University of Hong Kong and Kuwait University. While also noted for his work in a number of surgical fields, his scholarly work later focused increasingly on the new field of medical education, in which he became a leading figure.

== Career ==
A son of Martin Ware, editor of the British Medical Journal, he attended Bryanston School and studied medicine at the University of Cambridge and graduated in 1966. He then trained as a surgeon and became a Fellow of the Royal College of Surgeons in 1971. Until 1974 he worked as a surgeon at Charing Cross Hospital.

He then moved to Karolinska Institute in Sweden, where he became Associate Professor of Surgery. In 1989 he became Professor in Emergency and Critical Care Medicine at the United Arab Emirates University. He was Professor and Head of Section for Clinical Sciences at the International Medical University in Kuala Lumpur 1996–2000. He held professorships at the University of the Witwatersrand in Johannesburg 2000–2003 and at the Chinese University of Hong Kong 2003–2006. From 2000 he focused increasingly on the emerging field of medical education, becoming an international figure in the field.

From 2006 to 2011 he was Professor and Director of Medical Education at Kuwait University.
