= Chinese University of Hong Kong =

Public university in New Territories, Hong Kong

The Chinese University of Hong Kong
- 香港中文大學
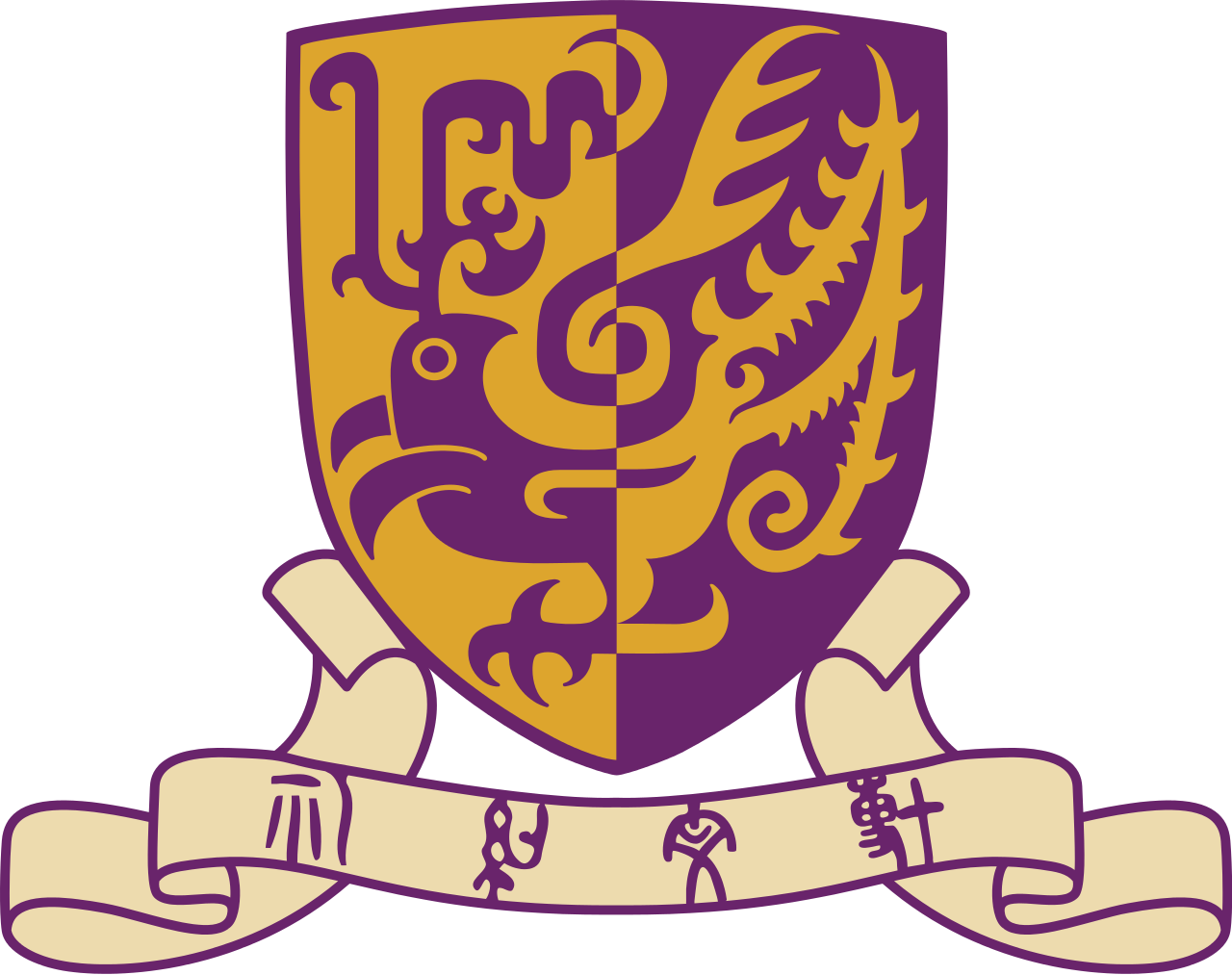
- Coat of Arms (Note: The Chinese University of Hong Kong has a coat of arms granted by the College of Arms in 1967. The full arms is very rarely used, while the shield-only emblem (found below) is the most common symbol of the university.)
- Motto: 博文約禮
- Motto in English: Through learning and temperance to virtue
- Type: Public research university
- Established: 17 October 1963; 63 years ago
- Affiliations: ACU; ACUCA; ASAIHL; BHUA; GHMUA; Heads of Universities Committee; JQRC; JUPAS; MISA; UGC
- Chairman: John Chai
- Chancellor: John Lee Ka-chiu
- Vice-Chancellor: Dennis Lo
- Provost: Poon Wai-yin, Isabella
- Pro-Vice-Chancellors: Poon Wai-yin; Sham Mai-har; Anthony T.C. Chan; Irwin King Kuo-chin; Kenneth Chen Wei-on
- Academic staff: 1,729 (2023)
- Students: 21,110 (2023)
- Undergraduates: 17,780 (2023)
- Postgraduates: 4,241 (2023)
- Location: Shatin, New Territories, Hong Kong; 22°25′11″N 114°12′24.45″E
- Campus: Rural 137.3 hectares (1.373 km^{2})
- Language: Chinese, English
- Colours: Purple & gold
- Mascot: Chinese phoenix
- Website: cuhk.edu.hk

Chinese name
- Traditional Chinese: 香港中文大學
- Simplified Chinese: 香港中文大学
- Cantonese Yale: Hēunggóng Jūngmàhn Daaihhohk
Transcriptions
Standard Mandarin
- Hanyu Pinyin: Xiānggǎng Zhōngwén Dàxué
Yue: Cantonese
- Yale Romanization: Hēunggóng Jūngmàhn Daaihhohk
- Jyutping: Hoeng1gong2 Zung1man4 Daai6hok6
- IPA: [hœ̂ːŋkɔ̌ːŋ tsʊ́ŋmɐ̏n tàːihɔ̀ːk]

The Chinese University of Hong Kong (Note: The word "Chinese" refers not only to the Chinese language, which "中文" means in modern Chinese. "Chinese" in this context refers to the ethnic group and, more importantly, the Chinese culture, according to the university's founding vice-chancellor.) (CUHK) is a public research university in Sha Tin, New Territories, Hong Kong. The Chinese University of Hong Kong (CUHK) is traditionally considered one of Hong Kong's "Big 3" universities, alongside The University of Hong Kong (HKU) and The Hong Kong University of Science and Technology (HKUST) due to their long history, strong academic programs, and high global standing.

Established in 1963 as a federation of three colleges – Chung Chi College, New Asia College, and United College, it is Hong Kong's second-oldest university, with the first being the University of Hong Kong. Predecessors of the university included St. John's University, Lingnan University and Yenching University, alongside 10 other Christian universities in China.

The university is organised into nine constituent colleges and eight academic faculties, and remains the only collegiate university in Hong Kong. The university operates in both English and Chinese.

CUHK's affiliated faculty members and researchers include one Nobel Prize laureate and one Dan David Prize winner. It is the only university in Hong Kong that appears in the Nobel Prize Laureates and Research Affiliations list published by the Nobel Prize organisation. This recognition is attributed to Professor Charles Kuen Kao, who was awarded the 2009 Nobel Prize in Physics and was affiliated with CUHK at the time of the award.

== History ==
=== Origins ===
The university was formed in 1963 as a federation of three existing colleges. The first of these, New Asia College, was established in 1949 by anti-Communist Confucian scholars from mainland China amid the Chinese Communist Revolution there. Among the founders were Ch'ien Mu, Tang Junyi, and Tchang Pi-kai. The college's curriculum focused particularly on Chinese heritage and social concerns. The early years of this school were tumultuous, with the campus relocating several times between rented premises around Kowloon. Academics there were often self-exiled from the mainland and struggled financially, with students sometimes sleeping on rooftops and teachers forgoing pay to sustain the college. Funds were gradually raised and the school moved to a new campus in Kau Pui Lung, built with the support of the Ford Foundation, in 1956.

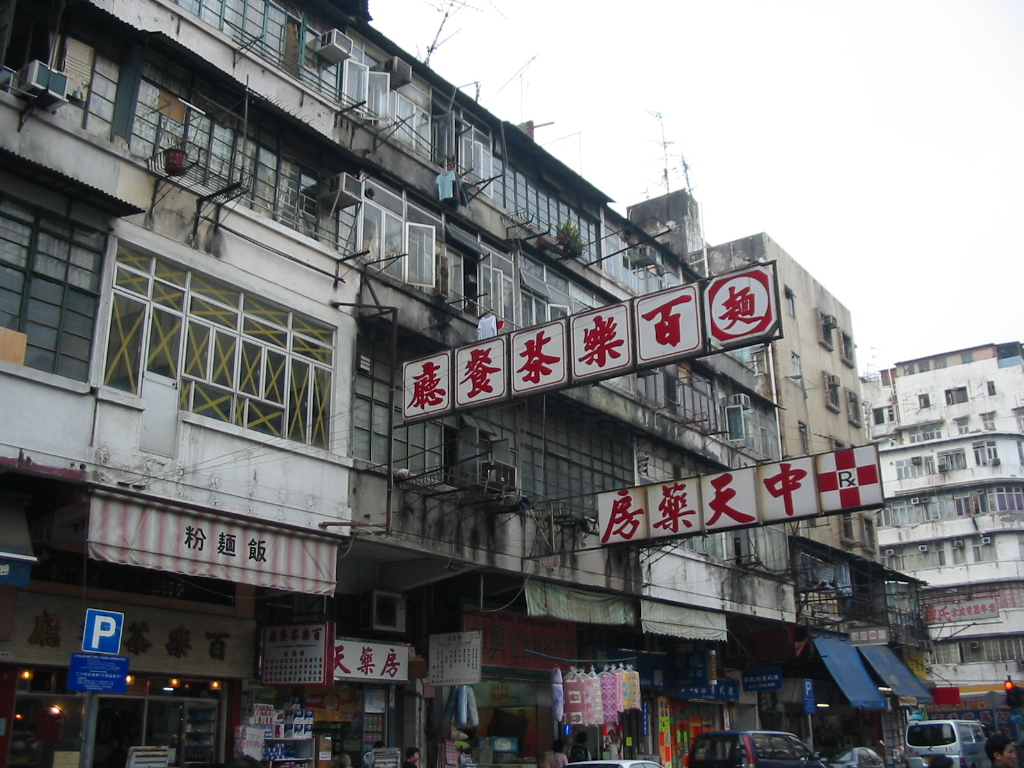
Former campus of New Asia College in Sham Shui Po

Following the Communist revolution in China and the breakdown in relations between the People's Republic of China and the United States with the 1950 outbreak of the Korean War, all Christian colleges and universities in China were shut down. Chung Chi College was founded in 1951 by Protestant churches in Hong Kong to continue the theological education of mainland churches and schools. The 63 students in its first year of operations were taught in various churches and rented premises on Hong Kong Island. The college moved to its present location in Ma Liu Shui (i.e., the present CUHK campus) in 1956. By 1962, a year before the founding of CUHK, Chung Chi had 531 students in 10 departments taught by a full-time faculty of 40 (excluding tutors).

United College was founded in 1956 with the merging of five private colleges in the Guangdong province: Canton Overseas, Kwang Hsia, Wah Kiu, Wen Hua, and Ping Jing College of Accountancy. The first school president was F.I. Tseung. The original campus on Caine Road on Hong Kong Island accommodated over 600 students.

In 1957, New Asia College, Chung Chi College, and United College came together to establish the Chinese Colleges Joint Council.

=== Foundation ===
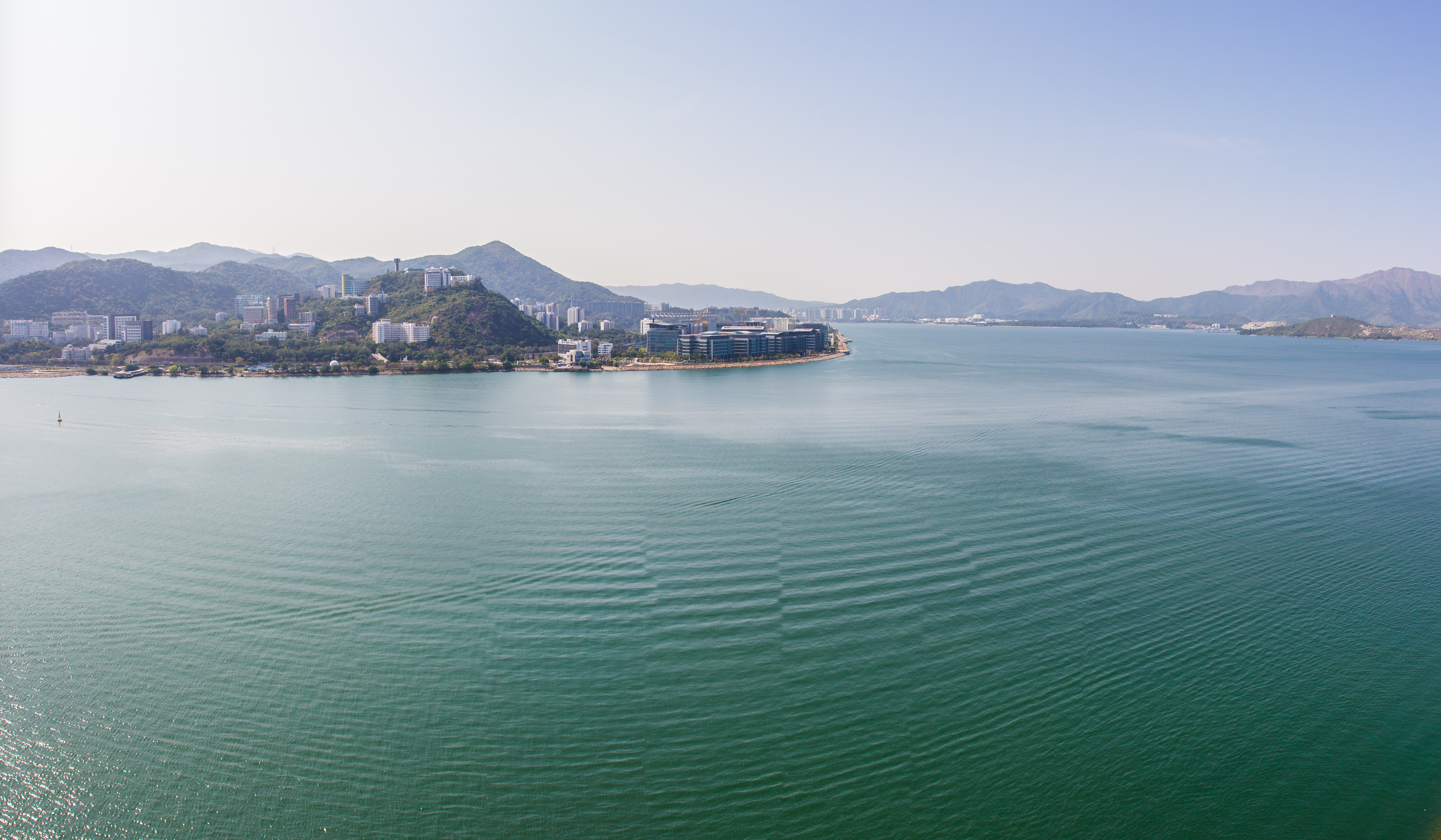
The campus is adjacent to the Tolo Harbour

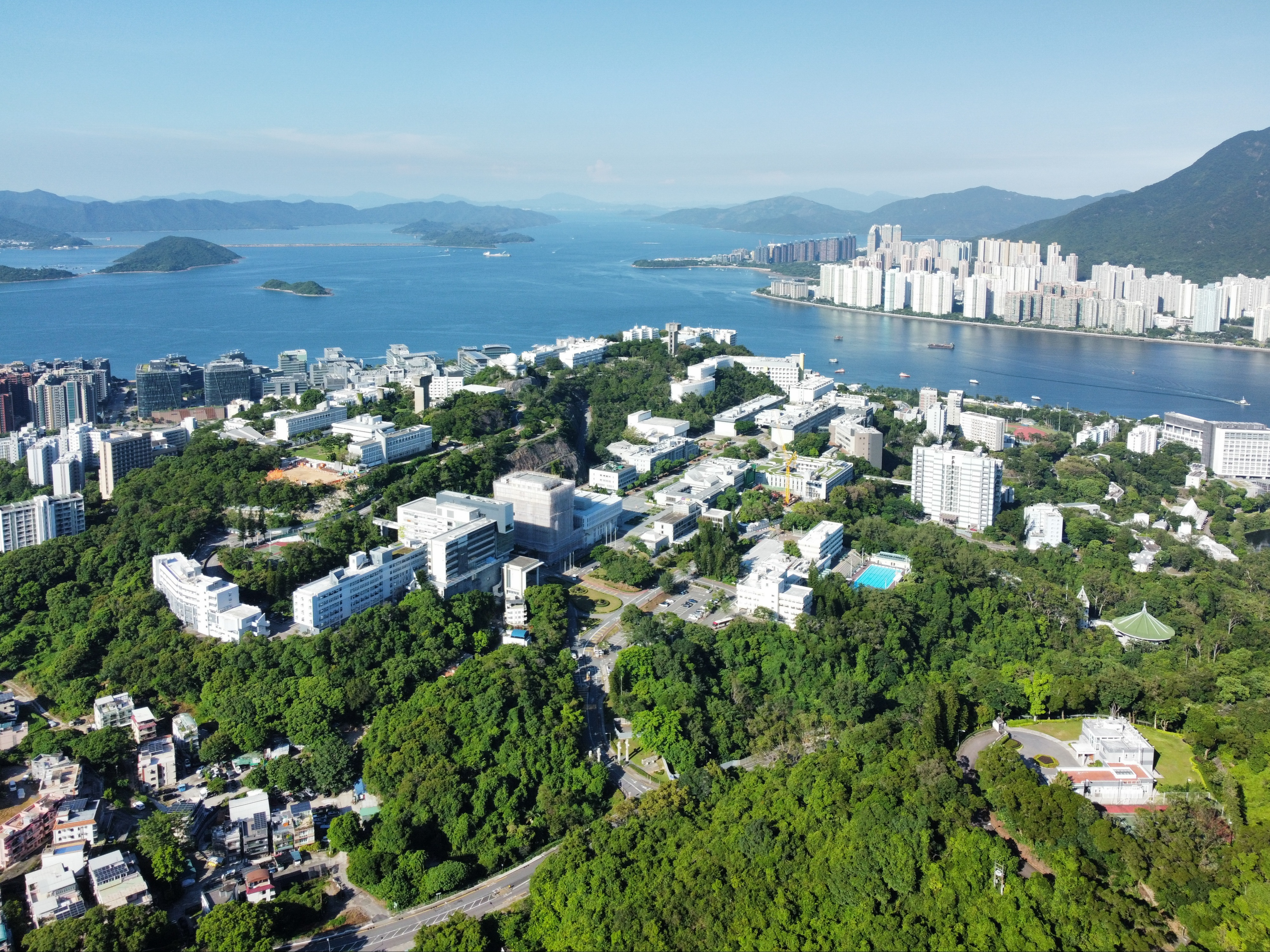
A view of the campus in Ma Liu Shui

In June 1959, the Hong Kong government expressed its intent in establishing a new university with Chinese as the medium of instruction. The same year, the Post-Secondary Colleges Ordinance was announced to provide government funding and official recognition to New Asia, Chung Chi, and United colleges in hopes that the money would "enable them to raise their standards to a level at which they might qualify for university status, probably on a federal basis". The ordinance was enacted on 19 May 1960.

The Chinese University Preparatory Committee was established in June 1961 to advise the government on possible sites for the new university. The following May, the Fulton Commission was formed to assess the suitability of the three government-funded post-secondary colleges to become constituent colleges of the new university. The commission, headed by Vice-Chancellor John Fulton of the newly-established University of Sussex, visited Hong Kong over the summer and produced an interim report recommending the establishment of the federal university comprising the three colleges.

The Fulton Commission report was tabled in the Legislative Council in June 1963, and the Chinese University of Hong Kong Ordinance was passed in September of that year. The school was officially inaugurated in a ceremony at the City Hall on 17 October 1963, officiated by the founding chancellor, Sir Robert Brown Black. The next year, Li Choh-ming was appointed the first vice-chancellor of the university. The university originally consisted of the Faculty of Arts, the Faculty of Science, and the Faculty of Social Science. Construction began at the site of the new campus in the Ma Liu Shui area, where Chung Chi College was already established, for new facilities to house central administration and the relocated New Asia and United colleges.

=== 1963–present ===
Construction of the new campus continued throughout the 1960s to a development plan produced by W. Szeto and Partners. Above the valley occupied by Chung Chi College, on two plateaux formed by granite quarrying for the Plover Cove dam, the quarters for the other two colleges would flank the Central Campus housing administrative buildings and other shared facilities. Some of the most iconic buildings on campus, like the University Library, were built in this period along the monumental axis of the University Mall in the subdued concrete aesthetic for which the school is known. The School of Education, which would later become a faculty, was founded in 1965. The Graduate School, the first in Hong Kong, was founded in 1966 and the first batch of master's degrees were awarded the following year.

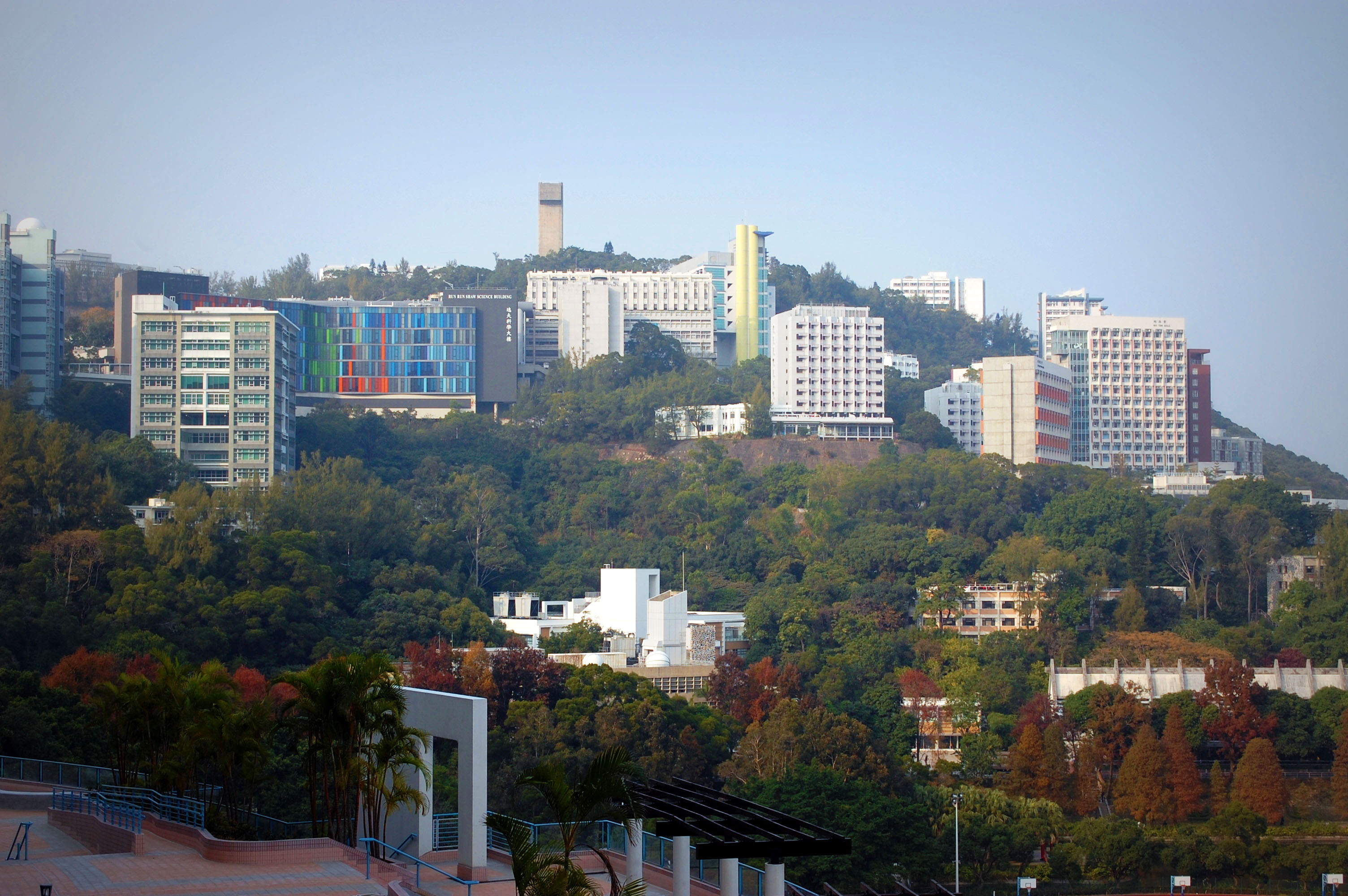
View from Chung Chi College towards New Asia College on the summit

In the early 1970s, New Asia and United Colleges moved into their new premises on the highest plateau of the campus. The Student Union was established in 1971, as "The Student Union of The Chinese University of Hong Kong" (香港中文大學學生會)(CUSU). The School of Medicine was founded in 1977 and its teaching hospital, the Prince of Wales Hospital in nearby Sha Tin New Town, was established years later in 1984.

The university constitution was also reviewed in the 1970s with an aim to assessing the school's growth and charting its future. In 1975, the chancellor appointed an external commission, again chaired by John Fulton, to review the university constitution. Aside from Fulton, the commission comprised I.C.M. Maxwell (its secretary), Sir Michael Herries, and C.K. Yang. The commission held five days of filmed hearings to garner comments from stakeholders. This second Fulton Report recommended that academic policy, finances, matriculation of students, appointment of staff, curriculum, examinations, and the awarding of degrees fall under the purview of the university administration. Buildings would also be maintained by the university regardless of which college owned them. The colleges would be entrusted with small group "student-oriented teaching". Rationalisation was suggested to reduce duplication of efforts among the different colleges.

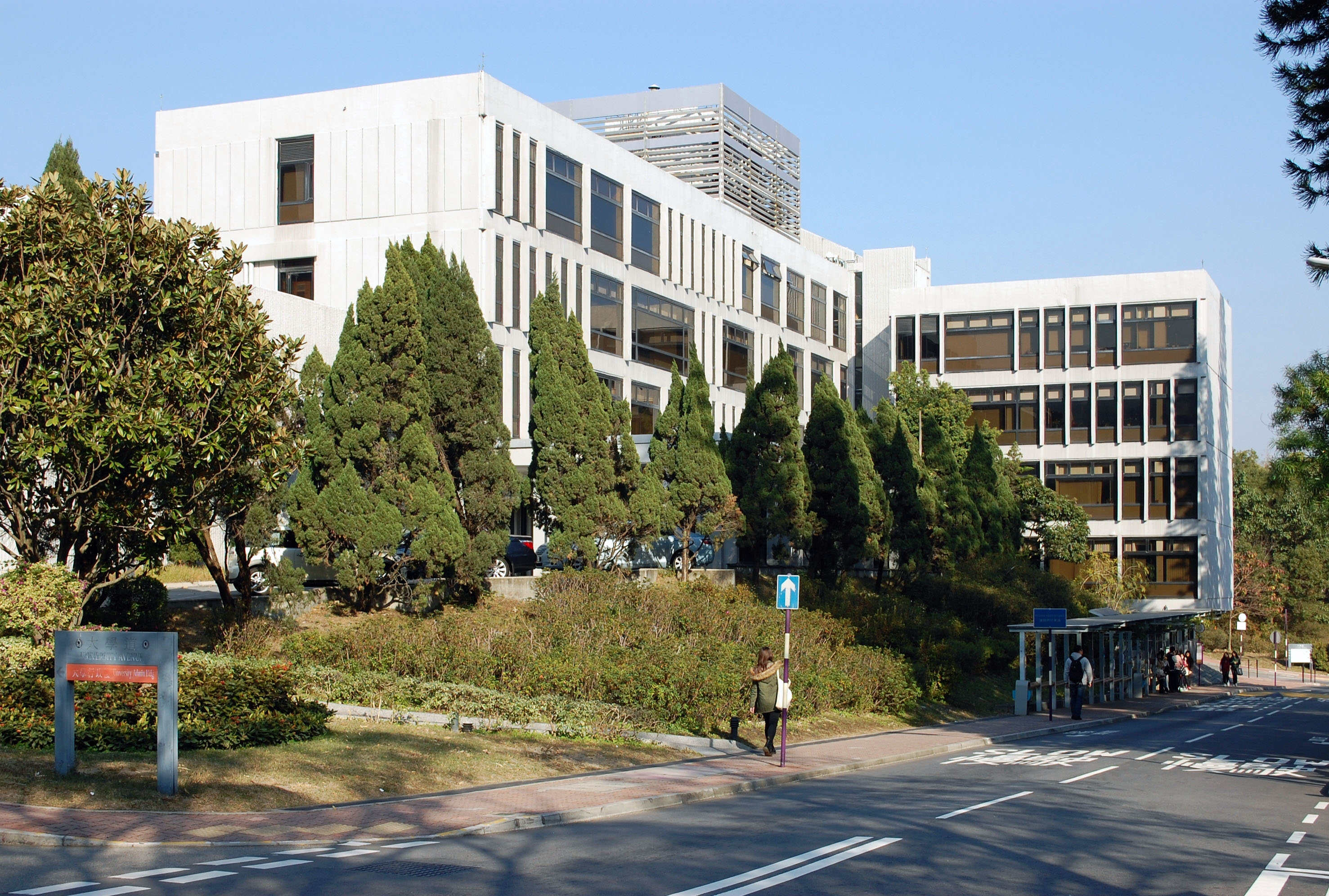
The University Administration Building

The federal structure of the university would thus be replaced by something closer to that of a unitary university. This was controversial among the colleges. The Board of Governors of New Asia College flatly rejected the recommendations of the report, alleging that it would destroy the collegiate system, turning the colleges into "empty shells". Dr. Denny Huang, a longtime member of the Board of Governors of Chung Chi College, criticised the effort to centralise powers and stated that the college governorship would be reduced to "nothing more than managers of an estate". The Fulton Report recommendations were packaged into the Chinese University of Hong Kong Bill 1976. In defence of the bill the acting Secretary for Social Services, M.C. Morgan, said that "a situation with each college developing into a little university of its own was not compatible with the sensible evolution of a modern major seat of higher learning". The changes recommended by the report came into effect in December 1976.

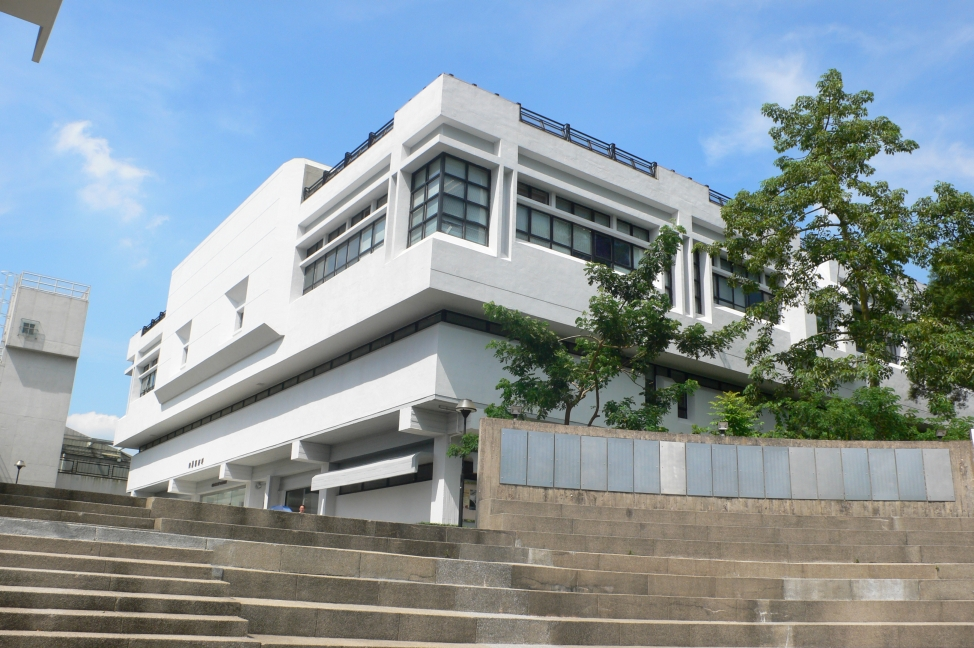
Ch'ien Mu Library

The first non-founding college, Shaw College, was named after its patron, Sir Run Run Shaw, who donated five hundred million Hong Kong dollars toward its establishment in May 1985. The Chinese University of Hong Kong (Declaration of Shaw College) Ordinance was passed by the Legislative Council in July 1986, and the fourth college was officially opened in March 1990 by Sir Run Run Shaw and Governor David Wilson.

The university established Hong Kong's first internet connection in September 1991.

The 1990s brought about another building boom. The original Chung Chi teaching and administration blocks were demolished and replaced with much larger and modern structures in several phases over the course of a decade. The Ho Sin-Hang engineering block opened in 1994 to house the new School of Engineering. In 1994, the school transitioned to the British-style three-year bachelor's degree system. The Hong Kong Internet Exchange (HKIX), a metropolitan network backbone, was founded in 1995 and remains an internet hub for the region. According to the Snowden Revelations in June 2013 the HKIX was targeted and hacked by the NSA.

In the 2000s, the university underwent another period of expansion, in part to accommodate increased student numbers brought about by the 334 Scheme. Five new colleges came into operation: Morningside College and S. H. Ho College were announced in 2006, and were followed in 2007 by C. W. Chu College, Wu Yee Sun College and Lee Woo Sing College. These colleges are smaller in scale than the older ones, each comprising only one or two blocks rather than an entire section of campus and housing fewer students, but they nonetheless each contain the usual array of facilities like student hostels, amenities and communal dining halls. New teaching blocks and a student amenity centre were also opened near the railway station.

==== Goddess of Democracy ====
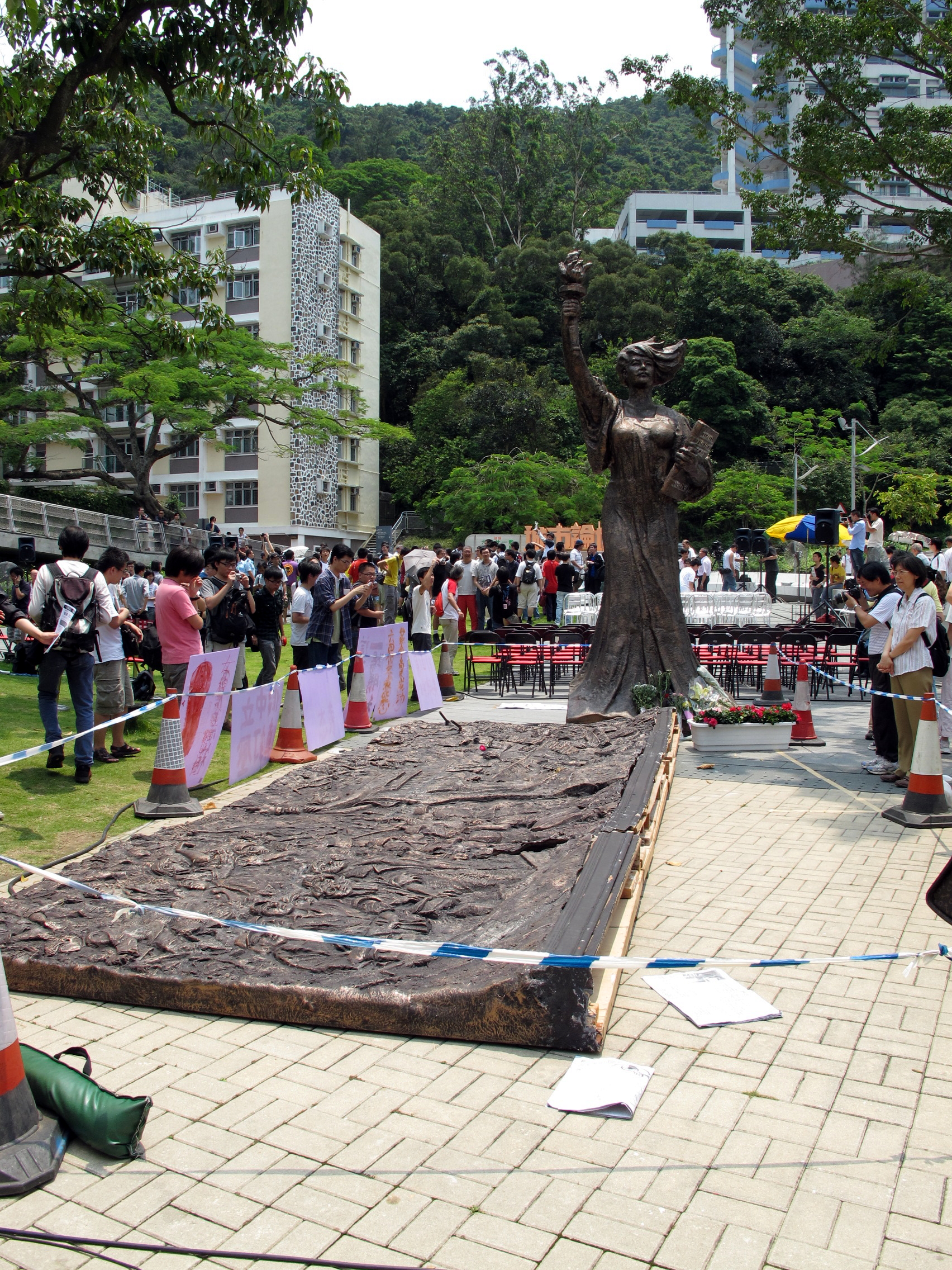
The Goddess and accompanying relief

On 29 May 2010, when the CUHK student union sought to permanently locate a 'Goddess of Democracy' statue on campus, the administrative and planning committee of the university convened an emergency meeting for 1 June, chaired by incumbent vice-chancellor Lawrence Lau, to consider the request. The application was turned down; the reason provided was the need for the university to maintain political neutrality. Staff and students objected to the refusal, however, accusing the committee of self-censorship; students declared they were prepared for a stand-off against the university, saying they would ensure the statues were accommodated on campus "at all costs".

A student meeting was convened, and student union President Eric Lai told 2,000 attendees that the university officials should apologise for their opposition of the art display. On 4 June, bowing to public outcry and student pressure, the university relented, and allowed the statue on campus.

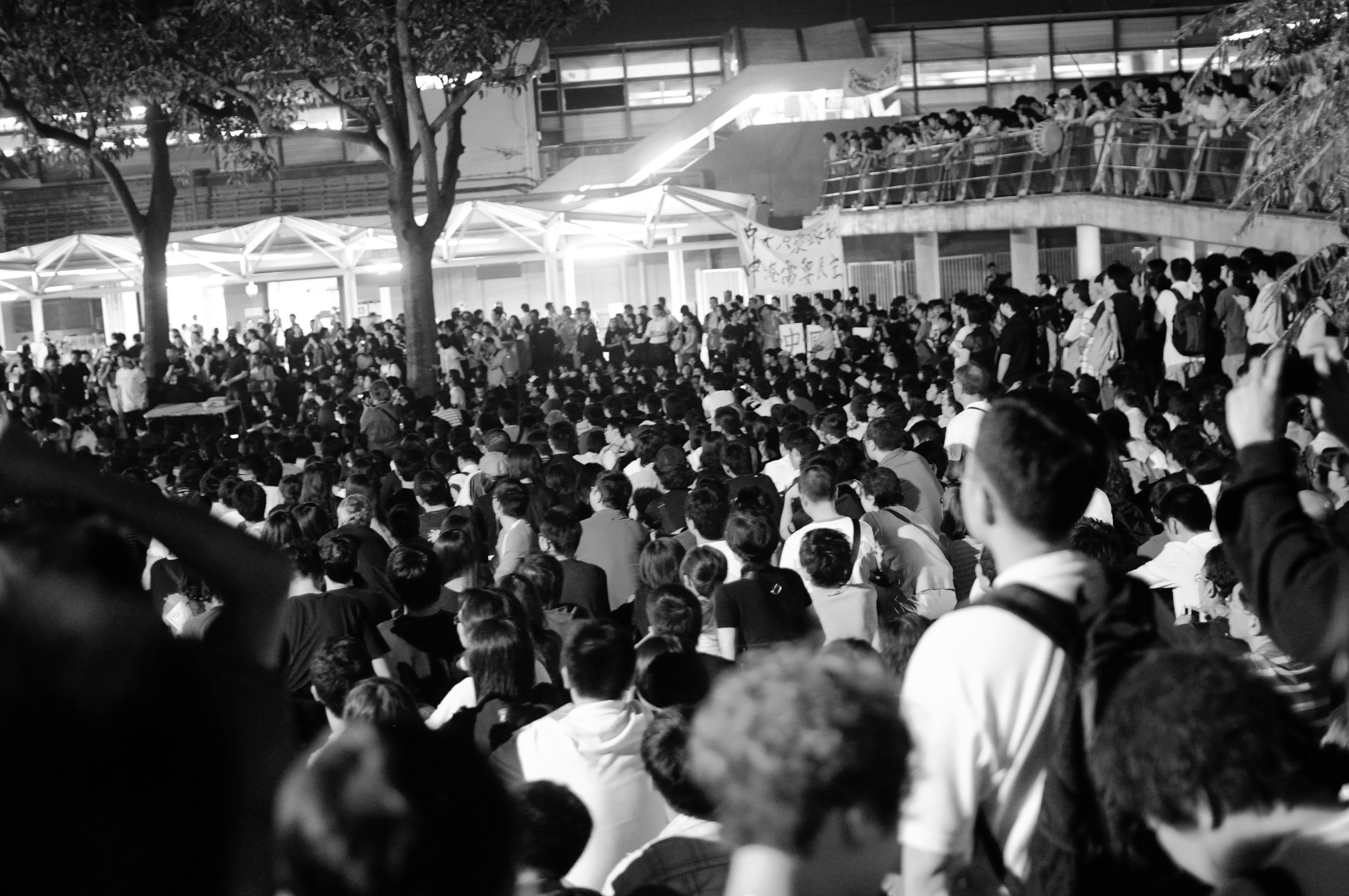
Students attending an open-air meeting on campus

Vice-chancellor-designate Joseph Sung, who was consulted on the vote in absentia, admitted that it was the biggest political storm in 21 years. He revealed that, in addition to preserving political neutrality, safety and security concerns were factors in the decision. He also drew a distinction between this application – for a permanent University installation – and hypothetical applications for short-term expressions of free speech, suggesting the latter would have been more likely to be approved, but he criticised the management team as "immature" and "inexperienced" in handling the incident.

An editorial in The Standard criticised the committee's naivety in not anticipating the reaction. It was also highly critical of Sung for seeking to distance himself from the decision with such a "lame excuse". Outgoing vice-chancellor Lawrence Lau defended the committee's decision as "collective and unanimous" after "detailed consideration," citing the unanimous vote of the administrative and planning committee, and he disagreed with Sung's characterisation of the management team. While the vote was unanimous, however, Sung stated that he had suggested the wording of the decision include the qualification that the committee "had not reached a consensus."

The student union said the two professors should have communicated to reach a consensus, and that Lau's reply "failed to explain why the school used political neutrality as a reason to reject the statue."

==== 2019 protest conflict ====
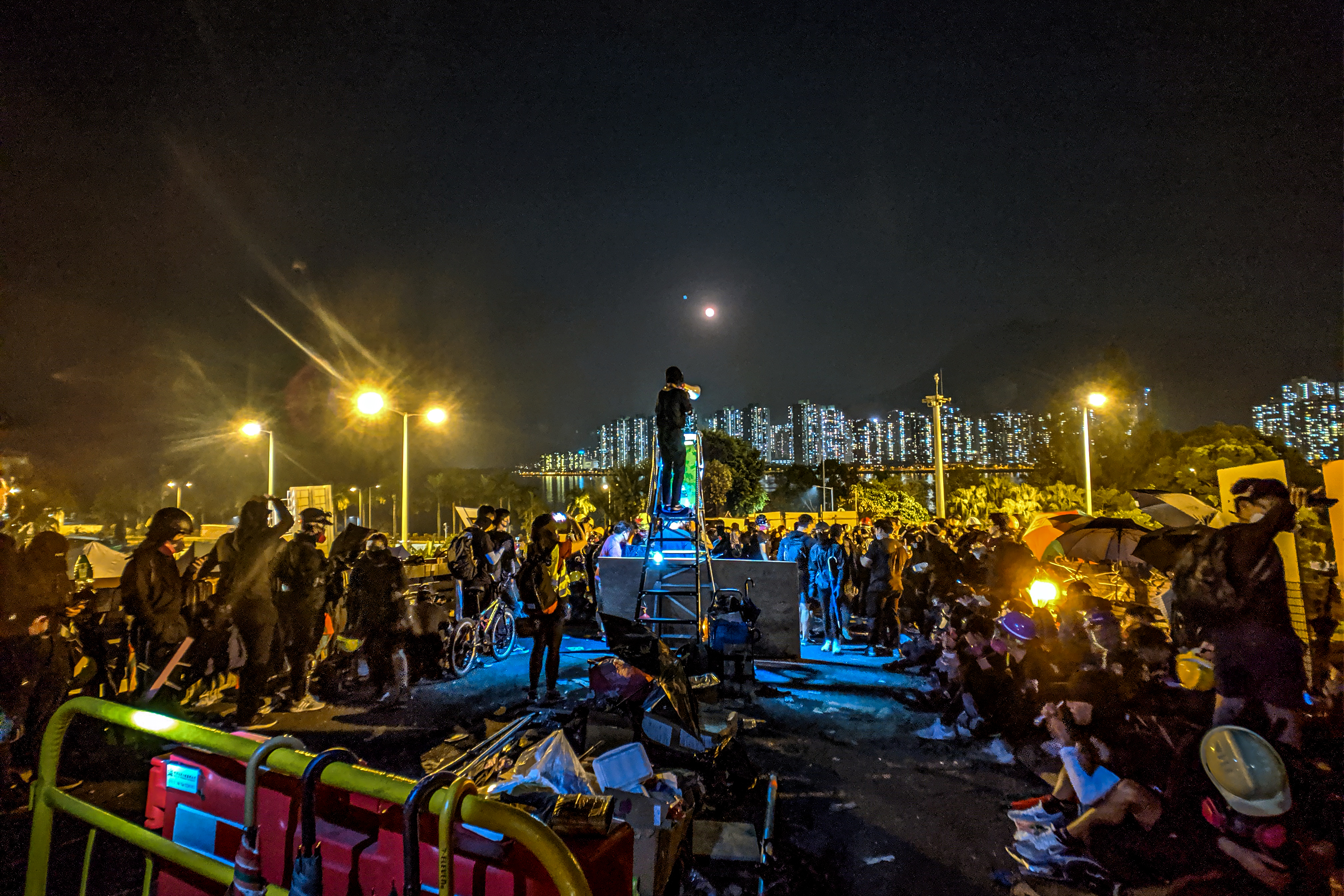
Confrontation between protesters and the police on the No. 2 Bridge of CUHK on 13 November 2019

During the 2019–20 Hong Kong protests, the campus became the site of a series of clashes between protesters and the police. Students and protesters disrupted traffic near the university, including the Tolo Highway, to facilitate a Hong Kong-wide general strike on 11 November 2019. On 12 November, riot police entered the campus to disperse the protestors, firing 1,567 tear gas rounds, 380 bean bag rounds and 1,312 rubber bullets while protesters built barricades, threw bricks and petrol bombs. Vice-chancellor Rocky Tuan tried to seek mediation with the police, which was rejected. It resulted in a two-day siege of the university by the police from 13 to 15 November. Most protesters left the campus by 15 November, with at least 70 students being injured. Protestors barricaded most entrances and exits, leading to a campus-wide traffic disruption. The increasing violence led to the University Senate voting to cancel the ongoing semester, followed by a university-wide evacuation. Mainland students were evacuated from the school by the Marine Police by marine vessels upon their request.

== Administration and organisation ==
=== Governance ===
Prior to Hong Kong's handover, the colony's governor was the de jure chancellor of the university. That role was assumed by the territory's chief executive following the handover. For a list of pre- and post-handover university chancellors, refer to the articles for the governor of Hong Kong and the chief executive of Hong Kong.

=== Administration ===
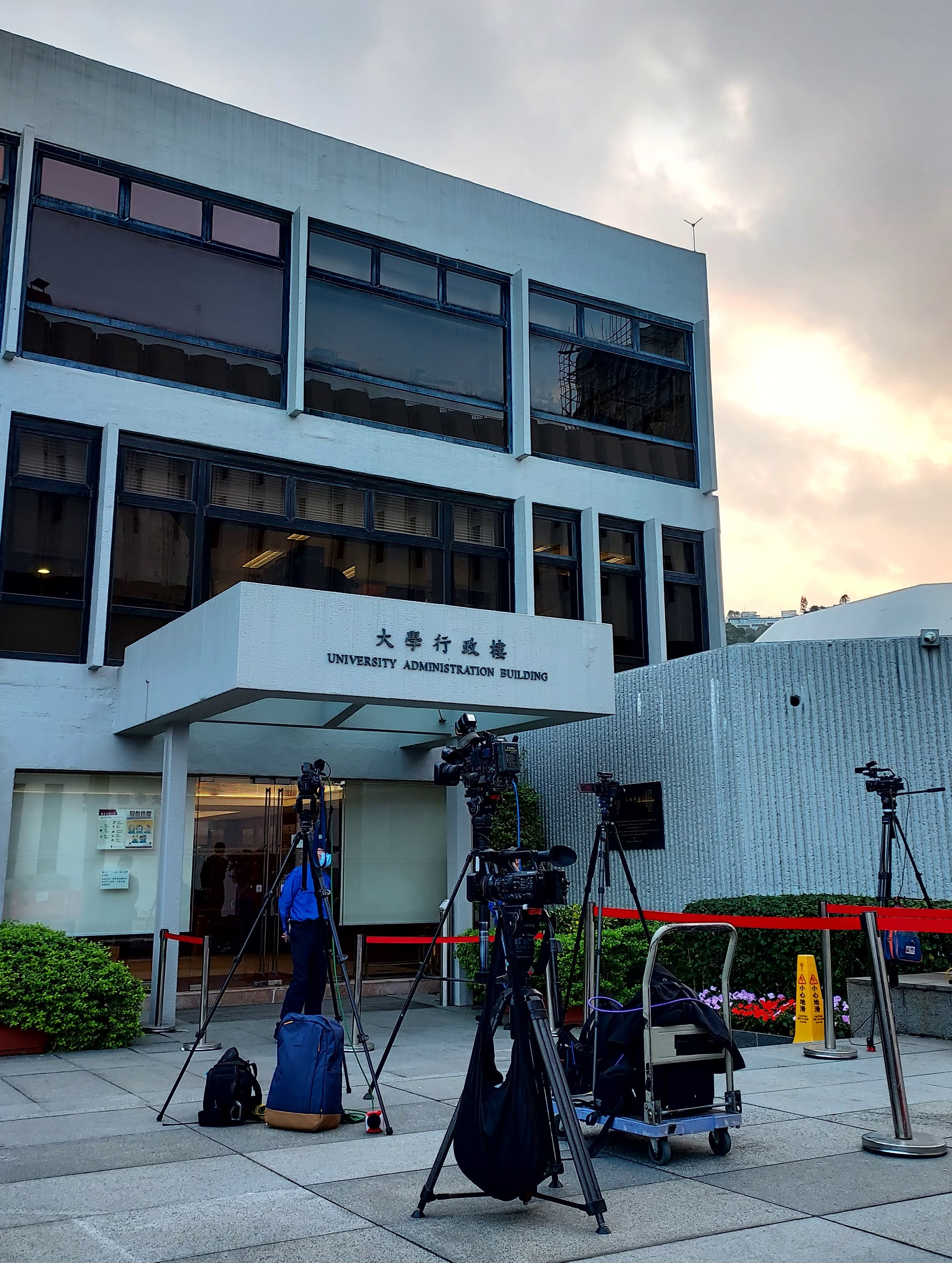
University Administration Building, with television crews after Rocky Tuan announced resignation in 2024

==== President and vice-chancellor ====
The president/vice-chancellor is under the council of the university, followed by the pro-vice-chancellor/vice-president. There are nine colleges and eight faculties, each of which has its own dean/head.

List of presidents and vice-chancellors since 1963

- Yung Chi-tung (Vice-principal as acting vice-Chancellor; 17 October 1963 – 6 February 1964)
1. Li Choh-ming (7 February 1964 – 30 September 1978)
2. Ma Lin (2 October 1978 – 30 September 1987)
3. Sir Charles Kao (2 October 1987 – 31 July 1996)
4. Arthur Li (1 August 1996 – 31 July 2002)
5. Ambrose King (11 September 2002 – 30 June 2004)
6. Lawrence Lau (1 July 2004 – 30 June 2010)
7. Joseph Sung (1 July 2010 – 31 December 2017)
8. Rocky Tuan (1 January 2018 – 7 January 2025)
9. Dennis Lo (from 8 January 2025)

=== Organisation ===
CUHK is a comprehensive research university with most departments and schools organised into eight faculties, namely the Faculties of Arts, Business Administration, Education, Engineering, Law, Medicine, Science, and Social Science, along with a graduate school which administers all the postgraduate programmes provided by different academic units. Moreover, associate School of Continuing and Professional Studies (CUSCS) offers associate degree and higher diploma programmes.

=== Funding ===
In 2005, the university budget was HK$4,558 million, with government subvention of about HK$2,830 million. In the 2018–19 fiscal year (starts 1 April), total income was increased to $9,624 million while government subvention had risen to $5,121 million, about 53.2% of the total budget.

== Academics ==
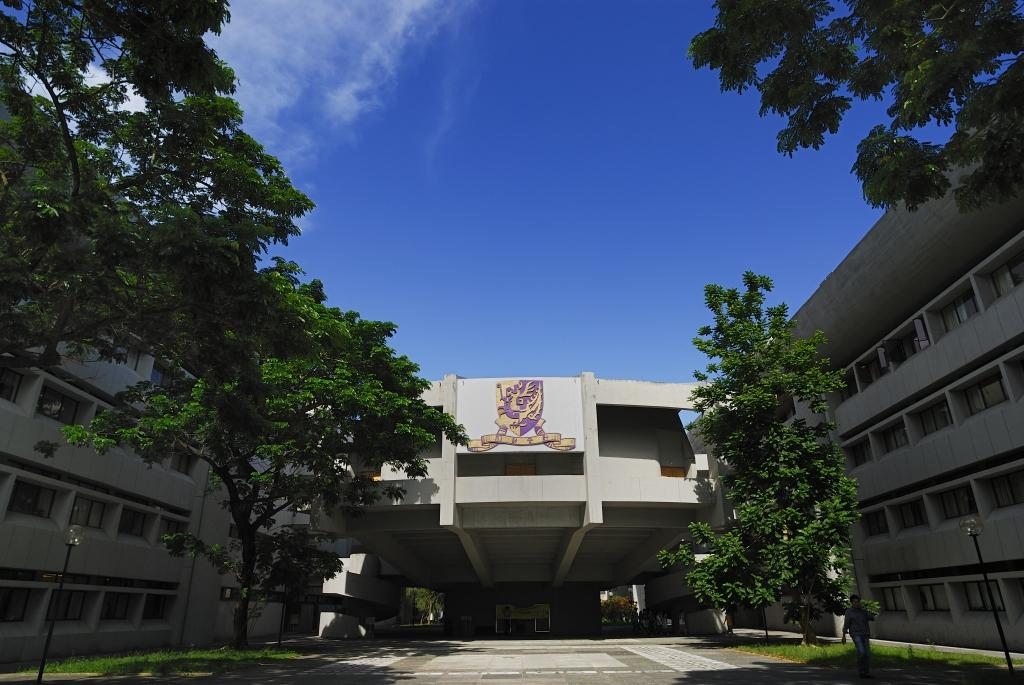
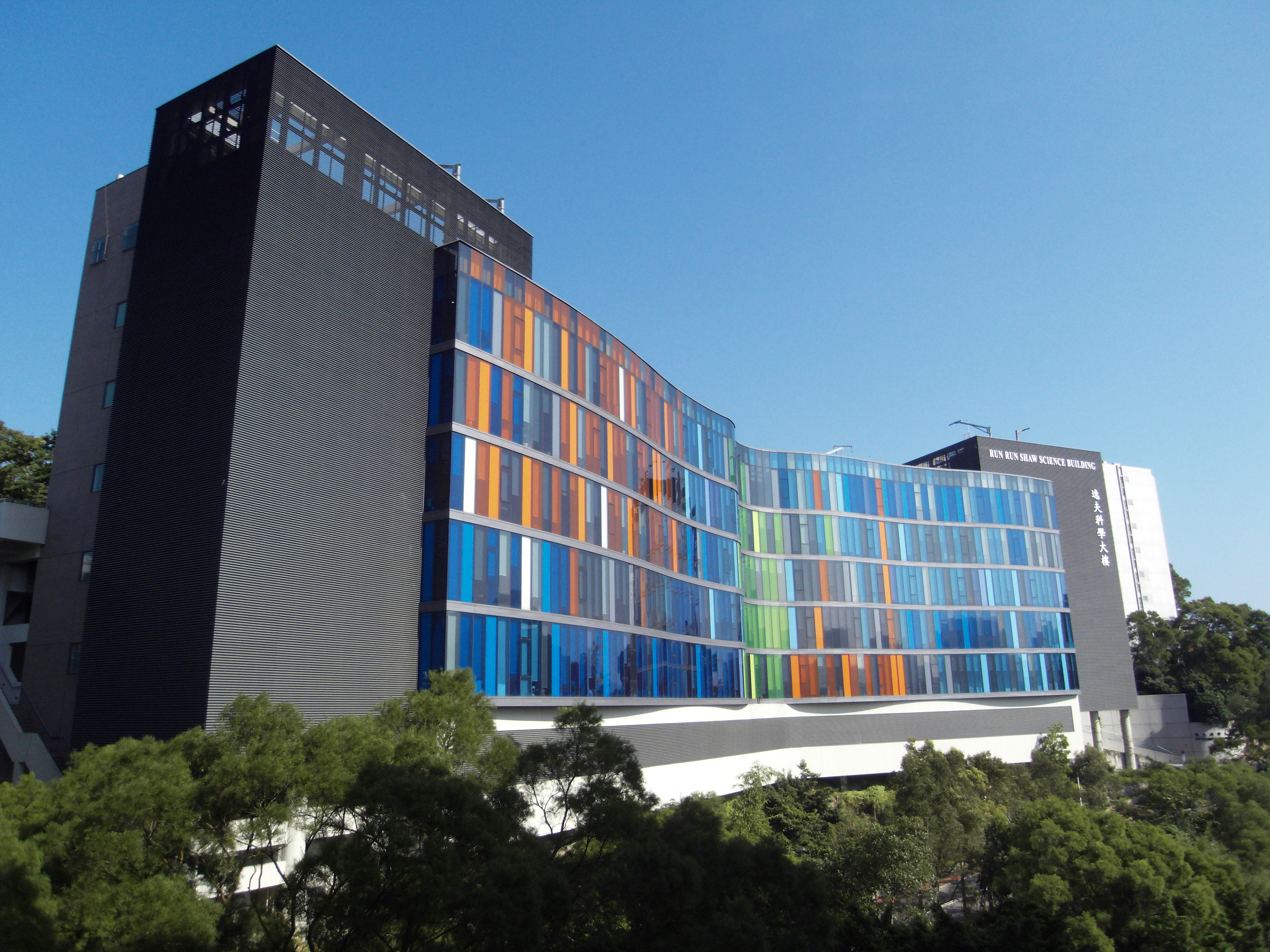
University Science Centre

=== Teaching and learning ===
CUHK currently adopts a strategic plan in five fields of academic inquiry: Biomedical Sciences, Chinese Studies, Economics & Finance, Geoinformation & Earth Sciences and Information Sciences. Despite the stipulation of using Chinese language as the principal medium in the university's ordinance, CUHK has emphasised the importance of both English and Chinese.

=== Research ===
The Yale-China Chinese Language Centre (CLC), formerly New Asia – Yale-in-China Chinese Language Center, was founded in 1963 under the joint auspices of New Asia College and the Yale-China Association. The centre became part of Chinese University in 1974 and has been responsible for the teaching of one language education (Putonghua and Cantonese) of university students as well as other Putonghua and Cantonese learners. Courses are offered for non-native speakers and for native speakers of Chinese. Programmes are divided into Putonghua courses for local students, Cantonese courses for mainland Chinese Students and Putonghua and Cantonese courses for non-native Chinese speakers.

The university also hosts several research centres. The Childhood Bilingualism Research Centre (CBRC) is part of the Department of Linguistics and Modern Languages. Research at the centre includes documenting the development of bilingualism in bilingual children and assessing the bilingual competence they gain in childhood; raising the public's awareness of Hong Kong children's development of biliteracy and trilingualism; and studying and supporting the revitalisation of minority languages in the context of bilingual and multilingual education. The centre is directed by Professor Virginia Yip and Professor Stephen Matthews. The Research Centre for Translation both studied translation as a scholarly subject and published the journal, Renditions from 1973 to 2024.

The Universities Service Centre for China Studies (USC), founded in 1963 as "The Universities Service Center," was renamed and moved from Kowloon to the campus in 1988. Its mission is to support the study of contemporary China and Hong Kong, especially among mainland Chinese, Hong Kong, and international scholars. The centre houses a major collection of mainland newspapers, periodicals, and official publications.

=== Libraries and museums ===
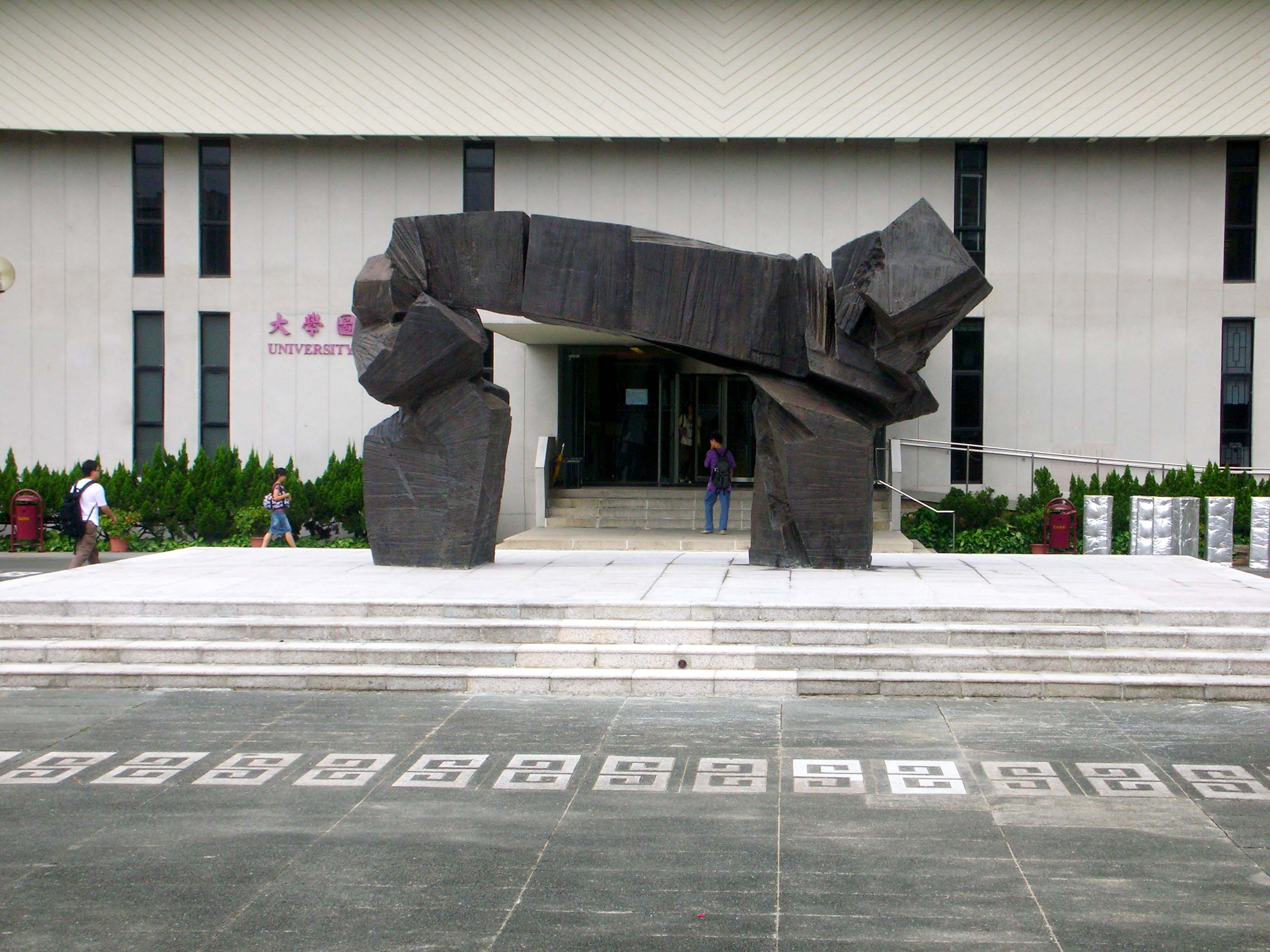
Gate of Wisdom, a 1987 bronze sculpture by Ju Ming, standing outside of the University Library

The University Library System (ULS) comprises seven different libraries and several special collections. The largest library is the University Library at the Central Campus, which recently underwent a significant renovation and building expansion. The other six libraries are the Elisabeth Luce Moore Library, Ch'ien Mu Library, Wu Chung Library, Architecture Library, Li Ping Medical Library, and Lee Quo Wei Law Library.

Among the collections housed by ULS includes the Hong Kong Studies Archive, Hong Kong Literature Collection, Chinese Overseas Collection, Nobel Laureate GAO, Xingjian Collection, Nobel Laureate CY Yang Archive, American Studies Resource Collection and Modern Chinese Drama Collection.

CUHK also houses the Chinese University of Hong Kong Art Museum, which houses "a wide range of artefacts illuminating the rich arts, humanities and cultural heritage of ancient and pre-modern China."

A new 800 square metres (8,600 sq ft) Museum of Climate Change, the first such museum in Hong Kong, opened in December 2013 in the Yasumoto International Academic Park building. Funded by the Hong Kong Jockey Club, the 100 exhibits on display illustrate the effects of climate change. The museum is open to the public free of charge. Also in 2013, the University Gallery opened in the central library to showcase the history of the school in light of its Golden Jubilee anniversary.

== Reputation and rankings ==
University rankings

Global – Overall
- ARWU World: 101-150 (2026)
- QS World: 18 (2027)
- THE World: 41 (2026)
- USNWR Global: 28 (2026)

Regional – Overall
- QS Asia: 5 (2027)
- THE Asia: 10 (2026)
- USNWR Asia: 5 (2026)

CUHK has been consistently regarded as one of the top two universities in Hong Kong by various university rankings, with the other being the University of Hong Kong.

=== Overall rankings ===
CUHK was ranked #18 worldwide in QS WUR 2027, #41 worldwide in THE WUR 2026, and #28 worldwide in US News & Report 2026–2027, and #101-150 worldwide in ARWU 2026. CUHK has been the top Hong Kong institution in the ARWU, which is based on awards and research output, including those league tables in 2006, 2010, 2011, and 2013. The HKU Public Opinion Programme survey (2012) gave it the 2nd place. China's Alumni Association placed it among the "6-Star Greater China's Universities" (the highest level). It was ranked fourth in the association's 2014 Ranking of Institutions with the Most Best Disciplines in HK, Macau and Taiwan.

CUHK was 65th worldwide in terms of aggregate performance across THE, QS, and ARWU, as reported by ARTU 2023.

=== Subject/area rankings ===
Besides overall rankings, a list of subject rankings of Hong Kong tertiary institutions is available to show the strength of its individual disciplines ranked by the above organisations. CUHK business school was ranked 17th in the Financial Times EMBA rankings, and its MBA programme was placed 27th worldwide in the Global MBA Rankings (2013) and 94th in the Economist's 2012 ranking.

CUHK received eight Higher Education Outstanding Scientific Research Output Awards (Science and Technology) from mainland China's Ministry of Education (MoE) in 2014, including two first-class awards and five second-class awards in Natural Sciences, making it the institution receiving the highest number of awards among Hong Kong tertiary institutions.

Despite a short history of 43 years as of 2024, CUHK's medical school was ranked as world's #49 in 2014, #47 in 2016, and #28 in 2024 in QS ranking. It has built abundant specialty research centres and hailed constant research innovations by its faculty. The medical school curriculum also places a heavy emphasis on bioethics and humanity in medicine and has built this course track in collaboration with Columbia University. The university's non-profit private teaching hospital, CUHK Medical Centre, opened in 2021.

== Student life ==
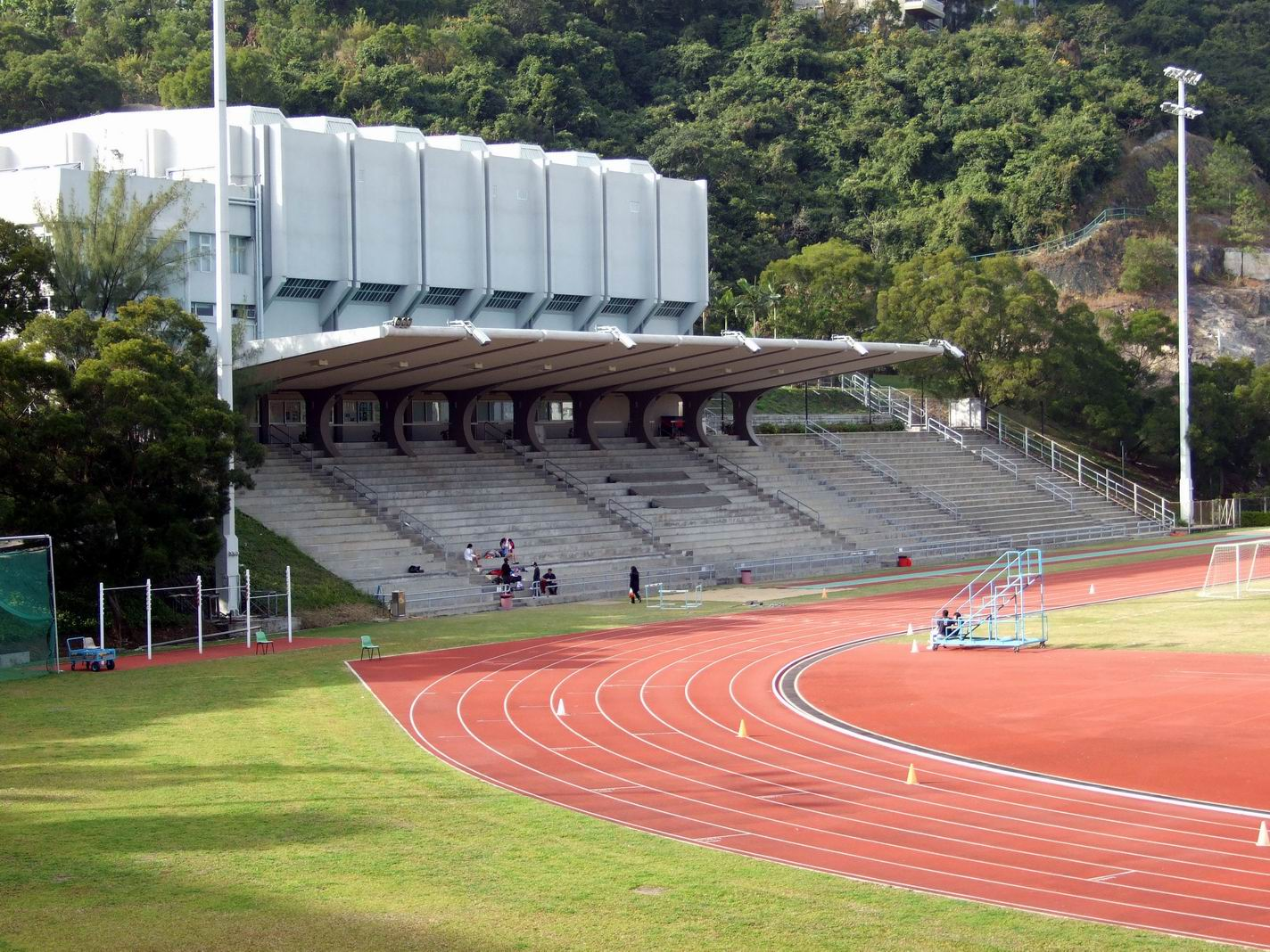
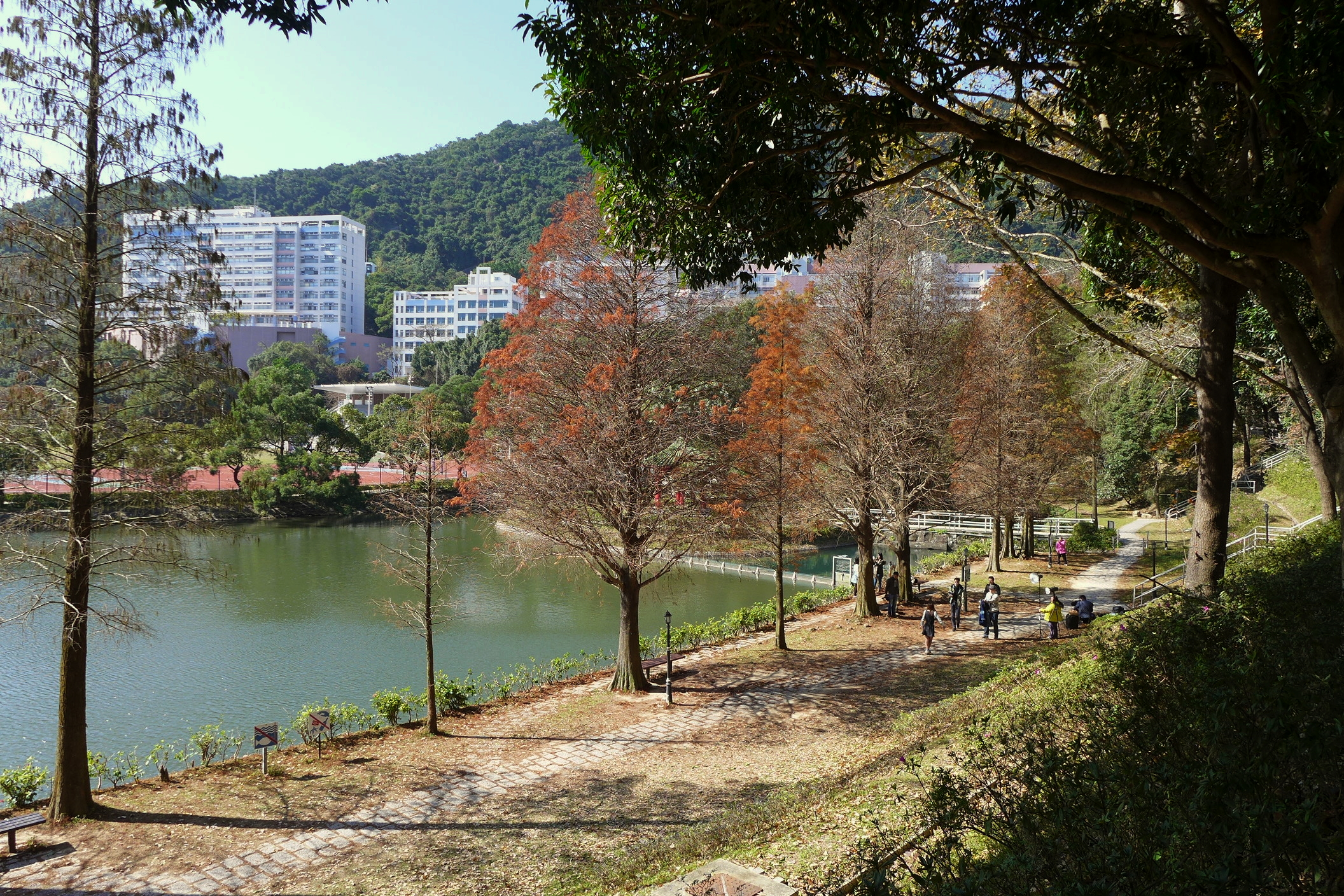
Sir Philip Haddon-Cave Sports Field; Lake Ad Excellentiam

=== School environment ===
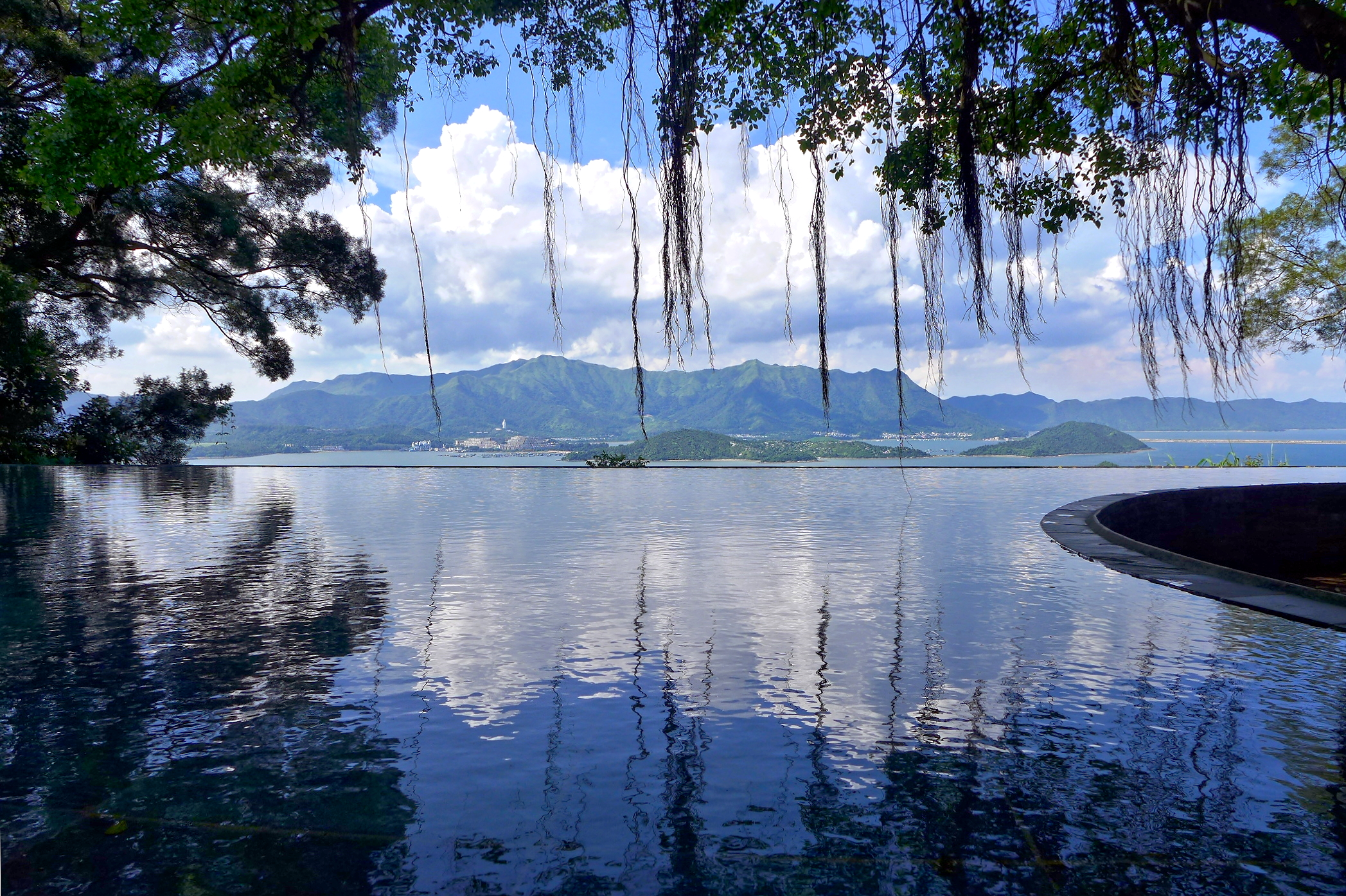
The Pavilion of Harmony, located in New Asia College, is a landmark of CUHK.

CUHK possesses the largest and greenest campus of all higher education institutions in Hong Kong. The hilly 138.4-hectare (342-acre) campus hosts facilities such as libraries, art museums, music halls, a swimming pool, sports fields, tennis courts, squash courts, a water sports centre, and gymnasiums. Many points (e.g. the Pavilion of Harmony) around the campus offer attractive views of Tide Cove and the Tolo Harbour.

The university has two full-size sports grounds with running tracks: the Sir Philip Haddon-Cave Sports Field and the Lingnan Stadium. The Olympic-size swimming pool at the Benjamin Franklin Centre was completed in 1973; its opening ceremony was held in October 1974 and hosted by Charles T. Cross. The university's Water Sports Centre, on the shore of Tide Cove, offers facilities and equipment hire for sailing, rowing, and windsurfing.

Most of CUHK's campus is located within Sha Tin District, though small parts of it are in Tai Po District.

=== Collegiate system ===
As a collegiate university, the school consists of nine colleges that differ in character and history, each retaining substantial autonomy on institutional affairs: Chung Chi College, New Asia College, United College, Shaw College, Morningside College, S. H. Ho College, Lee Woo Sing College, Wu Yee Sun College and C. W. Chu College. All undergraduates are affiliated to one of them.

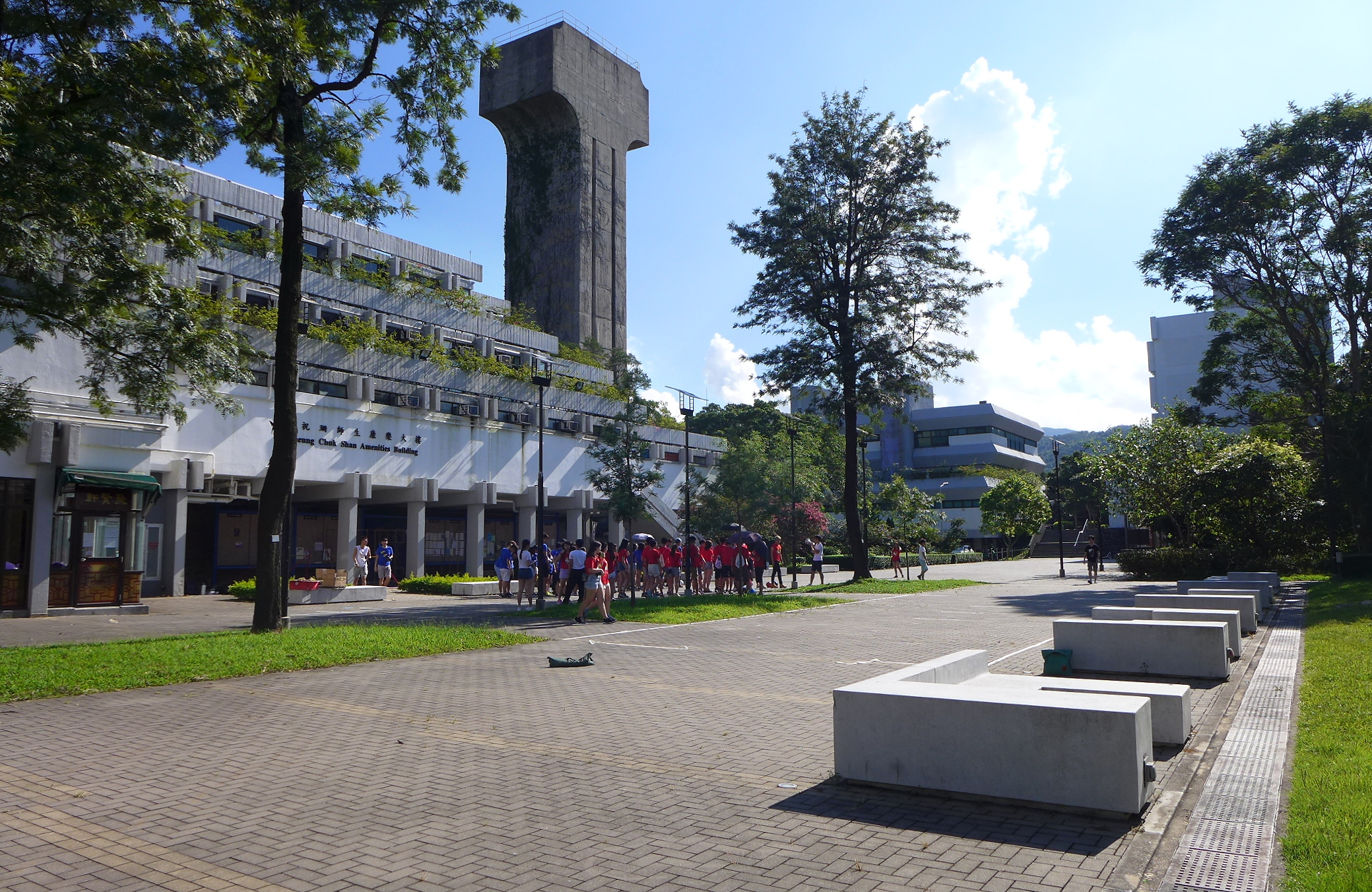
United College (above) and Chung Chi Tong student centre (below).

Colleges are designed as communities with their own hostels, dining halls, and other facilities. Students receive pastoral care and whole-person education, including formal and non-formal general education by means of close interaction with teachers and peers, and in some colleges, assemblies and final-year projects. Colleges promote extracurricular social and athletic activities with an aim of building camaraderie among students. This focus on 'student orientated teaching' – education through both formal teaching and student empowerment – distinguishes CUHK from other universities in the territory.

When the structure of the university was revamped in 1976, and the autonomy of the colleges diminished, John Fulton clarified the role of the colleges: "the natural home of student-oriented teaching is the college [which] is an association of senior and junior members come together in pursuit of shared academic interests and aims." He wrote that the colleges help students achieve "a sense of his or her personal significance and responsibility, and on that basis to enrich the common life."

=== Transportation ===
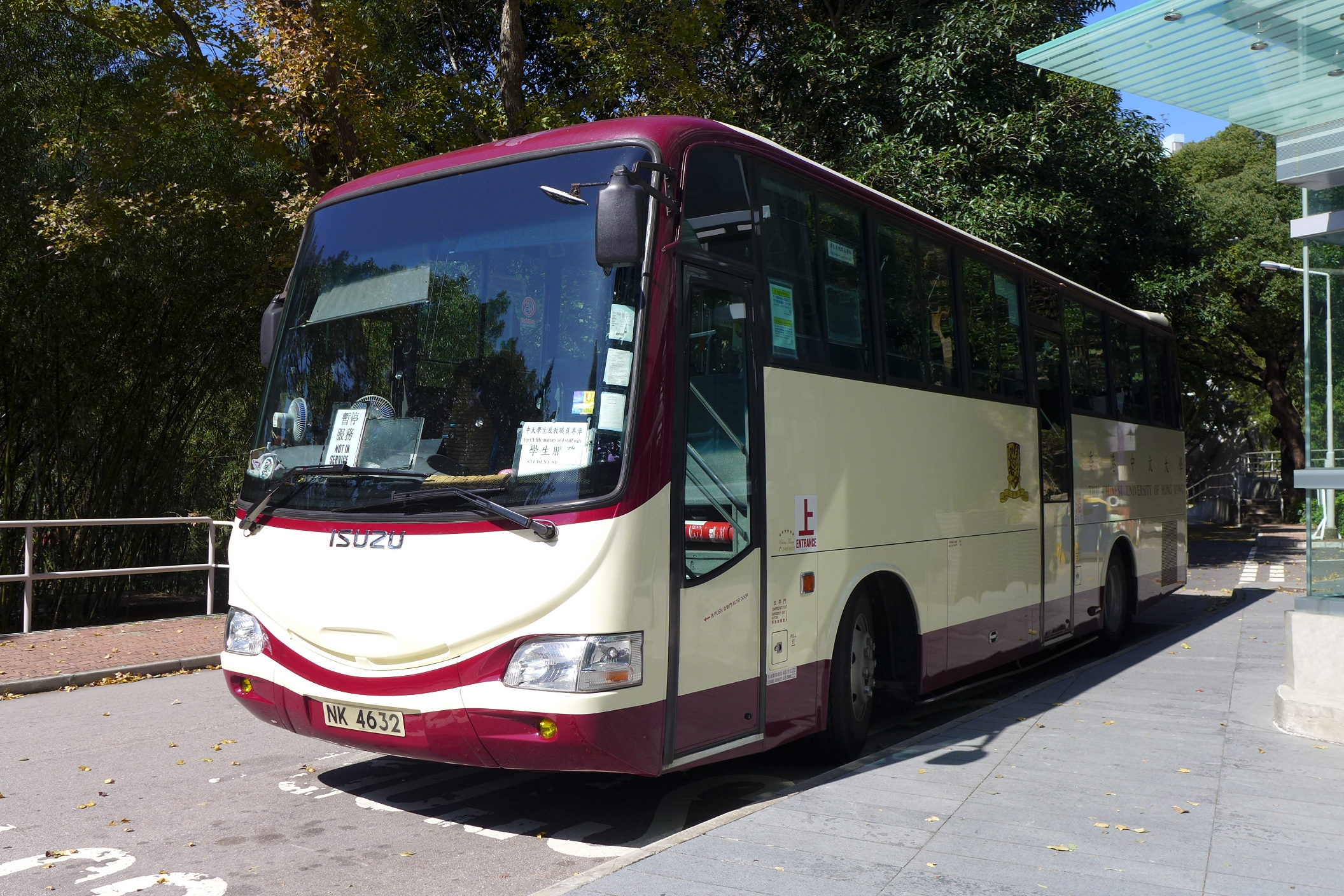
A shuttle bus operated by the Transport Office of CUHK

The university is accessible by the University station of the MTR East Rail Line and several bus routes. Bus and railway stations are located beside Chung Chi College, with additional bus stops just outside the two school entrances on Tai Po Road. Exit D of the MTR University station was opened in September 2012 to cope with the new students from the 3-3-4 education system.

A system of shuttle bus routes, operated by the university's Transport Office, runs between the MTR station, academic buildings, and residences. Shuttle buses are free for students and staff, and are intended for the use of students and staff only. Despite this, many visitors use the shuttle buses. Alongside the free shuttle bus service, paid shuttle light bus operates from Monday to Saturday.

The topography of the campus, as well as a layout confusing to newcomers, may deter many from walking around campus. Many buildings incorporate lifts and bridges designed to provide shortcuts in ascending the hill. The latest campus master plan proposes development of walking routes to reduce reliance on the campus bus system.

== Notable people ==
As of 2024, four Nobel Prize laureates are associated with the university, namely Chen Ning Yang, James Mirrlees, Robert Alexander Mundell, and the university's former vice-chancellor and president, Sir Charles K. Kao.

Other notable faculty members include mathematician Shing-Tung Yau, laureate of the Fields Medal and the Veblen Prize, computational theorist Andrew Yao, laureate of the Turing Award, and surgeon James Ware, who was a leading figure in the then emerging field of medical education.

== CUHK–Shenzhen ==
In 2014, The Chinese University of Hong Kong, Shenzhen (CUHK–Shenzhen) was officially founded in Shenzhen, a city of Guangdong Province on the southern coast of mainland China near Hong Kong. According to CUHK, its campus in Sha Tin and CUHK–Shenzhen are "one brand, two campuses", and are supervised by the same Senate. Graduates from CUHK–Shenzhen are awarded degrees of CUHK, the same as those awarded to CUHK graduates (but denoting "Shenzhen" in the main text), as well as a graduation certificate approved by the Ministry of Education and conferred by CUHK–Shenzhen.

== Hong Kong Institute of Asia-Pacific Studies ==
Hong Kong Institute of Asia-Pacific Studies 香港中文大學香港亞太研究所
- Established: 1990
- Mission: To promote multi-disciplinary research on social, economic and political development
- Chair: Chi-yue Chiu
- Head: Anthony Y. H. Fung JP
- Address: Room 507, 5/F; Esther Lee Building; Chung Chi College; The Chinese University of Hong Kong
- Location: Hong Kong
- Coordinates: 22.41445°N 114.208454°E
- Interactive map of Hong Kong Institute of Asia-Pacific Studies 香港中文大學香港亞太研究所
- Website: https://www.hkiaps.cuhk.edu.hk/

The Hong Kong Institute of Asia-Pacific Studies is an institute of The Chinese University of Hong Kong. It was established in 1990 with the aims to "promote multi-disciplinary research on social, economic and political development". The institute itself has a total of 10 research centres and 9 research programmes. The institute conducts itself through academic exchange by organising regular public lectures, seminars and international conferences. The Institute also publishes research findings to the public through the publication of research monographs and occasional papers.

The current director of the institute is Professor Anthony Y. H. Fung JP while the chairman of the management committee is Professor Chi-yue Chiu.

=== Research centres and programmes ===
==== Research Centres ====
- Centre for Chinese Family Studies
- Centre for Social Innovation Studies
- Centre for Social and Political Development Studies
- Centre for Urban Innovations
- Centre for Youth Studies
- Economic Research Centre
- Gender Research Centre
- International Affairs Research Centre
- Public Policy Research Centre
- Research Centre for Urban and Regional Development

==== Research Programmes ====
- Chinese Law Programme
- Economic Policy Programme
- Financial Markets Programme
- Global China Research Programme
- Sexualities Research Programme
- South China Programme
- Programme for Economic Education
- Research Forum@HKIAPS
- Trade and Development Programme

== See also ==
- Education in Hong Kong
- Joint University Programmes Admissions System
- List of buildings and structures in Hong Kong
- List of universities in Hong Kong
- Orientation camps in Hong Kong
- Renditions
- Chinese University of Hong Kong Chorus
- Chinese University of Hong Kong Press
- CUHK democracy wall standoff
