= New Asia College Ch'ien Mu Library =

College library in Hong Kong

- 新亞書院錢穆圖書館
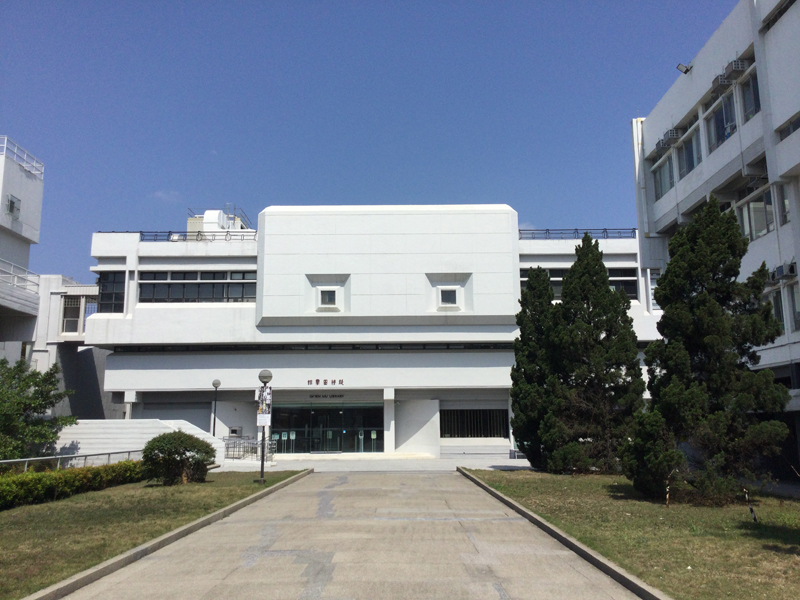
- Ch'ien Mu Library
- 22°25′17″N 114°12′31″E
- Location: Ma Liu Shui, Hong Kong
- Type: Academic library
- Established: 1954

Other information
- Affiliation: Chinese University of Hong Kong
- Website: lib.cuhk.edu.hk/nal

Chinese name
- Traditional Chinese: 新亞書院錢穆圖書館
- Simplified Chinese: 新亚书院钱穆图书馆
Transcriptions
Standard Mandarin
- Hanyu Pinyin: Xīn Yà Shūyuàn Qiánmù Túshūguǎn
Yue: Cantonese
- Jyutping: san1 aa3 syu1 jyun2 cin4 muk6 tou4 syu1 gun2

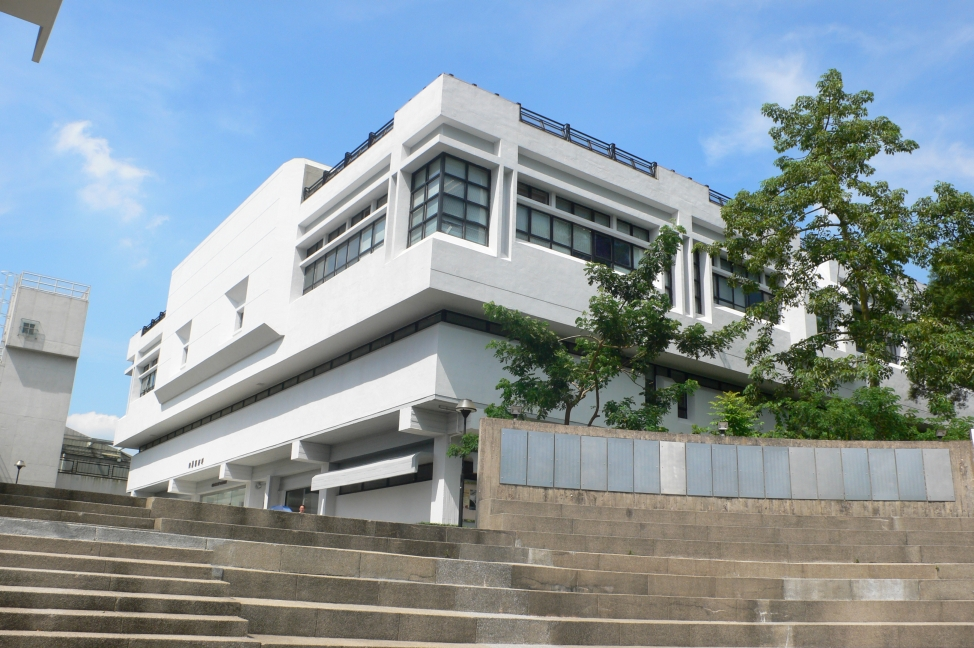
Ch'ien Mu Library

New Asia College Ch'ien Mu Library (新亞書院錢穆圖書館; noted as NAL) is the library of the New Asia College of the Chinese University of Hong Kong (CUHK).

As one of the seven libraries of CUHK and named after Ch'ien Mu, the Ch'ien Mu Library houses the collections on Chinese Language and Literature, Fine Arts, Japanese Language and Literature and General Education, and provides various facilities including Exhibition Areas, 24-Hour study facilities, Group Study Rooms and Outdoor Reading Area.

== Background ==
The New Asia College Library was first founded as part of the New Asia College on Farm Road, Kowloon in 1954. As the New Asia College became one of the constituent colleges of the CUHK, the library was also moved into the Ma Liu Shui campus in 1973 and named "Jing Ye Guan" afterwards. In 1975, it was renamed after Prof. Ch'ien Mu, the founder of the New Asia College. The bust of Mr. Ch’ien Mu, sculpted by Prof. Wu Wei-shan who was director of the Academy of Fine Art of Nanking University, was placed in the lobby of the Ch’ien Mu Library in 2004. The design of the elevated mezzanine in the building is modelled after the library of Berea College in Kentucky, United States.

== Resources and facilities ==
The collections of Ch’ien Mu Library focus on Chinese Language and Literature, Japanese Language and Literature and Fine Arts, in order to support the research activities and the teaching of programmes offered by the Department of Chinese Language and Literature, the Department of Japanese Studies and the Department of Fine Arts of the CUHK. In addition, the Library provides themed collections including the Ch'ien Mu Collection, New Asia College Collection, Local Art Archive, and Art Collection.

The 24-Hour study is located on the lower ground floor. On the ground floor, three Group Study Rooms and the learning cluster provide collaborative learning environment. Besides, the Exhibition Gallery on the mezzanine floor and second floor were established in 2004 for CUHK students and staff to display their artworks.
