= List of subject rankings of Hong Kong tertiary institutions =

This page lists various subject rankings, including QS University Subject Rankings, U.S. News & World Report, Times Higher Education World University Subjects Rankings and Academic Ranking of World Universities, of universities and colleges in Hong Kong. They adopt different ranking methodologies.

== Abbreviation ==
HKU: The University of Hong Kong
CUHK: The Chinese University of Hong Kong
HKUST: The Hong Kong University of Science and Technology
CityU: City University of Hong Kong
PolyU: The Hong Kong Polytechnic University
HKBU: Hong Kong Baptist University
LU: Lingnan University
EdU HK: The Education University of Hong Kong

== QS World University Rankings by Faculty ==
	2016		2017		2018		2019	
Discipline	Rank	Institute	Rank	Institute	Rank	Institute	Rank	Institute
Arts & Humanities	19; 30; 65; 97; 135; 181; 235	HKU; CUHK; CityU; PolyU; HKUST; HKBU; LU	13 31 54 106 127	HKU CUHK CityU PolyU HKUST	18 29 82 115	HKU CUHK CityU PolyU	16 31 89 95	HKU CUHK PolyU CityU
Engineering & Technology	14; 26; 41; 44; 60; 371	HKUST; HKU; CUHK; PolyU; CityU; HKBU	15 27 50 51 76	HKUST HKU CUHK PolyU CityU	17 30 41 56	HKUST HKU CUHK PolyU	18 35 57 70 79	HKUST HKU CUHK PolyU CityU
Life Sciences & Medicine	36; 76; 266; 341	HKU; CUHK; HKUST; PolyU	34 65 287	HKU CUHK HKUST	40 74 330	HKU CUHK HKUST	44 84 351	HKU CUHK HKUST
Natural Sciences	15; 29; 101; 103; 108; 307	HKU; HKUST; CUHK; PolyU; CityU; HKBU	21 42 111	HKU HKUST CUHK	26 48 118	HKU HKUST CUHK	31 42 100	HKU HKUST CUHK
Social Sciences & Management	14; 26; 27; 48; 49; 247	HKU; HKUST; CUHK; CityU; PolyU; HKBU	11 26 27 54	HKU CUHK HKUST PolyU	10 24 25 43 48	HKU HKUST CUHK CityU PolyU	18 26 30 59 69	HKU HKUST CUHK CityU PolyU

== QS World University Rankings by Subjects (top 200) ==
		2011		2012		2013		2014		2015		2016	
Discipline	Subject	Rank	Institute	Rank	Institute	Rank	Institute	Rank	Institute	Rank	Institute	Rank	Institute
Arts & Humanities	Philosophy	49	CUHK	21	CUHK	30; 43; 151-200	HKU; CUHK; HKBU	41; 101-150; 101-150	HKU; HKBU; LU	51-100; 101-150; 101-150	CUHK; LU; HKU	51-100; 51-100; 101-150	CUHK; HKU; LU
Arts & Humanities	Modern Languages	28; 35; 101-150; 151-200; 151-200	HKU; CUHK; HKUST; PolyU; CityU	15; 42; 51-100; 51-100; 51-100	HKU; CUHK; CityU; PolyU; HKUST	18; 34; 51-100; 151-200	HKU; CUHK; CityU; HKUST	11; 17; 41; 51-100; 51-100; 151-200; 151-200	CUHK; HKU; HKUST; CityU; PolyU; HKBU; LU	15; 30; 51-100; 101-150; 151-200	HKU; CUHK; CityU; PolyU; LU	15; 42; 101-150; 101-150; 151-200; 151-200	HKU; CUHK; CityU; PolyU; LU; HKBU
Arts & Humanities	Geography & Area Studies	20; 34; 151-200	HKU; CUHK; PolyU	33; 151-200	CUHK; PolyU	33; 101-150; 101-150; 101-150	CUHK; HKBU; PolyU; HKUST	25; 51-100; 101-150	HKU; CUHK; HKUST	19; 46; 101-150; 101-150; 101-150	HKU; CUHK; HKBU; PolyU; HKUST	13; 49; 51-100; 101-150; 101-150	HKU; CUHK; PolyU; HKBU; HKUST
Arts & Humanities	History	-	-	-	-	-	-	38; 101-150	HKU; HKUST	40; 45; 101-150	HKU; CUHK; HKUST	51-100; 101-150; 151-200	HKU; CUHK; HKUST
Arts & Humanities	Linguistics	27; 47	CUHK; CityU	40; 51-100	CityU; CUHK	22; 35; 45	CityU; CUHK; PolyU	18; 23; 24; 48	HKU; PolyU; CityU; CUHK	9; 18; 21; 35; 101-150	HKU; CityU; CUHK; PolyU; HKUST	10; 25; 29; 41; 101-150	HKU; CUHK; CityU; PolyU; EdUHK
Arts & Humanities	English Language & Literature	21; 47; 51-100; 101-150; 151-200	HKU; CUHK; CityU; HKUST; PolyU	34; 35; 43; 101-150; 151-200	HKU; CityU; CUHK; HKUST; PolyU	26; 38; 42; 101-150; 151-200; 151-200	HKU; CUHK; CityU; PolyU; HKUST; LU	-	-	24; 51-100; 51-100; 101-150	HKU; CityU; CUHK; PolyU	24; 51-100; 51-100; 101-150	HKU; CityU; CUHK; PolyU
Engineering & Technology	Computer Science & Information Systems	26; 41; 51-100; 51-100; 101-150	HKUST; HKU; CityU; CUHK; PolyU	13; 22; 42; 51-100; 51-100	HKUST; HKU; CUHK; CityU; PolyU	10; 12; 19; 49; 51-100	HKU; HKUST; CUHK; PolyU; CityU	11; 14; 18; 50; 51-100	HKUST; HKU; CUHK; PolyU; CityU	8; 12; 18; 51-100; 51-100; 251-300	HKUST; HKU; CUHK; PolyU; CityU; HKBU	14 19 22 49 49	HKUST HKU CUHK CityU PolyU
Engineering & Technology	Chemical Engineering	51-100; 51-100; 101-150	HKUST; HKU; CUHK	20; 51-100; 101-150; 151-200	HKUST; HKU; CUHK; PolyU	22; 51-100; 101-150; 101-150	HKUST; HKU; CUHK; PolyU	26; 51-100; 51-100; 101-150	HKUST; CUHK; HKU; PolyU	27; 51-100; 51-100; 101-150	HKUST; CUHK; HKU; PolyU		
Engineering & Technology	Civil & Structural Engineering	25; 42; 51-100; 51-100	HKU; HKUST; CityU; PolyU	14; 28; 50; 51-100	HKU; HKUST; PolyU; CityU	8; 16; 17; 51-100	HKU; PolyU; HKUST; CityU	10; 12; 15; 31	HKU; HKUST; PolyU; CityU	9; 11; 17; 35	HKU; HKUST; PolyU; CityU		
Engineering & Technology	Electrical & Electronic Engineering	21; 28; 51-100; 51-100; 151-200	HKU; HKUST; CUHK; CityU; PolyU	17; 20; 51-100; 51-100; 101-150	HKUST; HKU; CUHK; CityU; PolyU	14; 19; 22; 44; 51-100	HKUST; HKU; CUHK; CityU; PolyU	11; 27; 38; 51-100; 51-100	HKUST; HKU; CUHK; CityU; PolyU	19; 22; 25; 37; 51-100	HKUST; HKU; CUHK; CityU; PolyU	20 22 25 51-100 51-100	CUHK HKU HKUST CityU PolyU
Engineering & Technology	Mechanical; Aeronautical & Manufacturing Engineering	44; 51-100; 151-200	HKUST; CityU; PolyU	19; 30; 51-100; 101-150; 101-150	HKUST; HKU; PolyU; CUHK; CityU	27; 35; 51-100; 51-100; 51-100	HKUST; HKU; CUHK; CityU; PolyU	20; 34; 43; 51-100; 51-100	HKUST; HKU; PolyU; CityU; CUHK	31; 46; 51-100; 51-100; 101-150	HKUST; HKU; PolyU; CUHK CityU	39 44 51-100 51-100 51-100	HKUST HKU CityU CUHK PolyU
Medicine	Medicine	45; 101-150	HKU; CUHK	28; 51-100	HKU; CUHK	24; 51-100	HKU; CUHK	24; 49	HKU; CUHK	28; 51-100	HKU; CUHK	30; 51-100; 301-400	HKU; CUHK; CityU
Medicine	Biological Sciences	46; 51-100; 101-150	HKU; HKUST; CUHK	42; 101-150; 151-200	HKU; HKUST; CUHK	51-100; 101-150; 101-150	HKU; CUHK; HKUST	42; 51-100; 51-100	HKU; CUHK; HKUST	51-100; 101-150; 101-150; 301-400; 301-400	HKU; CUHK; HKUST; CityU; PolyU	49; 101-150; 101-150; 301-400; 301-400	HKU; CUHK; HKUST; CityU; PolyU
Medicine	Psychology	30; 51-100; 151-200	HKU; CUHK; CityU	22; 37; 51-100	HKU; CUHK; CityU	18; 29; 101-150	HKU; CUHK; CityU	25; 41	HKU; CUHK	34; 43; 101-150	HKU; CUHK; CityU	41; 51-100; 101-150	HKU; CUHK; CityU
Medicine	Pharmacy & Pharmacology	-	-	34; 51-100	HKU; CUHK	51-100; 51-100	CUHK; HKU	37; 101-150	HKU; CUHK	34; 46	HKU; CUHK	37; 46	CUHK; HKU
Medicine	Dentistry	-	-	-	-	-	-	-	-	2	HKU	1	HKU
Medicine	Agriculture & Forestry	-	-	-	-	-	-	-	-	-	-	-	-
Natural Sciences	Physics & Astronomy	51-100; 51-100; 51-100; 151-200	HKU; CUHK; HKUST; CityU	51-100; 51-100; 101-150; 151-200	HKU; HKUST; CUHK; CityU	51-100; 51-100; 151-200; 151-200	HKU; HKUST; CUHK; CityU	51-100; 101-150	HKUST; HKU	51-100; 101-150; 151-200; 201-250; 201-250	HKUST; HKU; CUHK; CityU; PolyU	51-100; 51-100; 151-200; 201-250; 201-250	HKUST; HKU; CUHK; CityU; PolyU
Natural Sciences	Mathematics	50; 50; 51-100; 51-100; 101-150	HKUST; CUHK; CityU; HKU; PolyU	19; 23; 25; 51-100; 51-100; 101-150	CityU; CUHK; HKU; PolyU; HKUST; HKBU	25; 32; 40; 44; 51-100	CUHK; CityU; HKUST; HKU; PolyU	26; 40; 45; 45; 101-150	CUHK; CityU; HKUST; HKU; PolyU	20; 29; 33; 42; 101-150; 201-250	HKU; CityU; HKUST; CUHK; PolyU; HKBU	27 39 44 50 51-100	CUHK CityU HKU HKUST PolyU
Natural Sciences	Environmental Sciences	33; 50	HKU; HKUST	32; 37	HKUST; HKU	41; 49	HKU; HKUST	25; 51-100	HKUST; HKU	51-100; 51-100; 250-300	HKUST; HKU; HKBU		
Natural Sciences	Earth & Marine Sciences	101-150; 101-150; 151-200	HKU; HKUST; CUHK	19; 51-100; 151-200	HKU; HKUST; CUHK	51-100; 151-200; 151-200	HKU; HKUST; PolyU	34; 101-150; 151-200	HKU; HKUST; PolyU	26; 151-200; 151-200	HKU; PolyU; HKUST		
Natural Sciences	Chemistry	43; 47; 101-150	HKUST; HKU; CUHK	9; 11; 51-100; 151-200	HKU; HKUST; CUHK; CityU	20; 24; 101-150; 151-200	HKU; HKUST; CUHK; PolyU	19; 35; 151-200; 151-200	HKUST; HKU; CUHK; PolyU	23; 25; 101-150; 101-150; 151-200; 201-250	HKU; HKUST; CUHK; PolyU; CityU; HKBU		
Natural Sciences	Materials Sciences	35; 47; 51-100	HKUST; HKU; CityU	36; 51-100; 51-100; 101-150	HKUST; HKU; CUHK; CityU	23; 51-100; 51-100; 101-150	HKUST; HKU; CUHK; CityU	29; 51-100; 51-100; 151-200	HKUST; CUHK; HKU; CityU	44; 51-100; 51-100; 51-100	HKUST; CityU; HKU; CUHK		
Natural Sciences	Geography	-	-	-	-	-	-	-	-	19; 46; 101-150; 101-150; 101-150	HKU; CUHK; HKBU; PolyU; HKUST	13 49 51-100	HKU CUHK PolyU
Social Sciences	Statistics & Operational Research	26; 30; 40; 47; 51-100	HKU; HKUST; CUHK; CityU; PolyU	14; 16; 39; 51-100; 51-100	HKUST; HKU; CUHK; CityU; PolyU	7; 15; 21; 25; 43	HKUST; HKU; CUHK; PolyU; CityU	15; 19; 39; 43; 51-100	HKUST; HKU; PolyU; CUHK; CityU	15; 19; 39; 43; 51-100	HKUST; HKU; PolyU; CUHK; CityU	23; 24; 39; 46; 51-100	HKU; HKUST; CUHK; PolyU; CityU
Social Sciences	Sociology	26; 30; 40; 47; 51-100	HKU; HKUST; CUHK; CityU; PolyU	19; 30; 51-100	HKU; CUHK; CityU	39; 40; 101-150; 151-200	CUHK; HKU; CityU; PolyU	39; 41; 101-150; 101-150	CUHK; HKU; CityU; PolyU	26; 37; 51-100; 151-200	CUHK; HKU; CityU; PolyU	28; 39; 101-150; 151-200	HKU; CUHK; CityU; PolyU
Social Sciences	Politics & International Studies	27; 51-100	HKU; CityU	19; 46; 51-100	HKU; CUHK; CityU	12; 45; 51-100	HKU; CityU; CUHK	16; 38; 39	HKU; CityU; CUHK	26; 36; 51-100	HKU; CUHK; CityU	23; 51-100; 51-100	HKU; CUHK; CityU
Social Sciences	Law	31; 51-100	HKU; CUHK	16; 51-100	HKU; CUHK	20; 51-100; 51-100	HKU; CUHK; CityU	18; 51-100; 51-100	HKU; CityU; CUHK	19; 42; 51-100	HKU; CUHK; CityU	18; 50; 51-100	HKU; CUHK; CityU
Social Sciences	Economics & Econometrics	42; 43; 51-100; 101-150; 151-200	HKUST; HKU; CUHK; CityU; PolyU	29; 35; 51-100; 101-150; 101-150	HKU; HKUST; CUHK; CityU; PolyU	30; 32; 42; 101-150; 101-150	HKU; HKUST; CUHK; CityU; PolyU	28; 30; 34; 51-100; 101-150	HKU; HKUST; CUHK; PolyU; CityU	30; 36; 49; 51-100; 51-100	HKUST; HKU; CUHK; PolyU; CityU	25; 37; 46; 51-100; 51-100	HKUST; HKU; CUHK; PolyU; CityU
Social Sciences	Accounting & Finance	30; 41; 49; 51-100; 101-150	HKUST; HKU; CUHK; CityU; PolyU	22; 26; 49; 51-100; 51-100	HKUST; HKU; CUHK; CityU; PolyU	16; 23; 33; 51-100; 51-100	HKUST; HKU; CUHK; CityU; PolyU	18; 19; 27; 51-100; 51-100; 151-200	HKU; HKUST; CUHK; CityU; PolyU; LU	17; 23; 35; 51-100; 51-100	HKUST; HKU; CUHK; CityU; PolyU	19; 23; 30; 51-100; 51-100	HKUST; HKU; CUHK; CityU; PolyU
Social Sciences	Communication & Media Studies	-	-	21; 41; 51-100	HKU; CUHK; CityU	29; 36; 51-100; 101-150	CUHK; CityU; HKU; HKBU	19; 30; 50; 101-150	CUHK; CityU; HKU; HKBU	23; 51-100; 51-100; 51-100	CUHK; CityU; HKU; HKBU	26; 31; 43; 51-100	CUHK; CityU; HKU; HKBU
Social Sciences	Education	-	-	8; 26	HKU; CUHK	11; 23	HKU; CUHK	16; 25; 51-100	HKU; CUHK; HKIEd	6; 15; 20	HKU; HKIEd; CUHK	6; 12; 26	HKU; EdUHK; CUHK
Social Sciences	Statistics	-	-	-	-	-	-	-	-	20; 22; 45; 51-100; 51-100; 151-200	HKUST; HKU; PolyU; CityU; CUHK; HKBU	23 24 39 46	HKU HKUST CUHK PolyU

== U.S. News & World Report – Best Global Universities Rankings by Subjects ==
	2016		2019	
Discipline	Rank	Institute	Rank	Institute
Arts & Humanities	95	HKU	27 103 132	HKU CUHK CityU
Biology & Biochemistry	130	HKU	125	HKU
Chemistry	73 126 147 151 191	HKUST HKU PolyU CUHK CityU	39 164 181 185 201	HKUST HKU CUHK CityU PolyU
Computer Science	13 16 32 35 35	HKUST CityU CUHK PolyU HKU	11 17 27 34 76	CityU HKUST CUHK PolyU HKU
Clinical Medicine	94 104	HKU; CUHK	87 118	HKU CUHK
Economics & Business	57 57 63 85 96	CityU HKUST CUHK HKU PolyU	39 67 68 77	HKUST CityU CUHK HKU
Engineering	10 15 24 43 77	CityU PolyU HKUST HKU CUHK	15 16 25 34 83	CityU PolyU HKUST HKU CUHK
Materials Science	40 44 75 85 105	HKUST CityU PolyU HKU CUHK	22 31 48 73 86	HKUST CityU CUHK PolyU HKU
Mathematics	32 73 122 137	CUHK CityU PolyU HKBU	31 59 74	CUHK CityU PolyU
Pharmacology & Toxicology	57 76	CUHK HKU	71 102	CUHK HKU
Psychiatry & Psychology	96 134	HKU CUHK	86 145	HKU CUHK
Social Sciences & Public Health	108 143 152 229	HKU CUHK PolyU CityU	63 99 131	HKU PolyU CUHK

== Times Higher Education World University Subjects Rankings ==
The institution had ranked the top 50 universities in each of the six categories but was added to 100 in the latest 2013-14 league tables.

	2010-11		2011-12		2012-13		2013-14	
Subject	Rank	Institute	Rank	Institute	Rank	Institute	Rank	Institute
Art & Humanities	-	-	36	HKU	29	HKU	40; 65	HKU; CUHK
Clinical, Pre-clinical & Health	22	HKU	34	HKU	36	HKU	48; 73	HKU; CUHK
Engineering & Technology	19; 20	HKU; HKUST	28; 37	HKUST; HKU	23; 43	HKUST; HKU	21; 42; 80; 89	HKUST; HKU; CityU; PolyU
Life Sciences	29; 50	HKU; HKUST	-	-	-	-	-	-
Physical Sciences	36; 43	HKU; HKUST	-	-	-	-	86	HKU
Social Sciences	27	HKU	27	HKU	30; 50	HKU; HKUST	39; 45; 70	HKU; HKUST; CUHK

	2018		2019	
Subject	Rank	Institute	Rank	Institute
Arts and Humanities	28 59 126-150	HKU CUHK PolyU	29 64 126-150	HKU CUHK PolyU
Computer Science	28 38 55 74	HKUST CUHK HKU CityU	28; 37; 46; 74; 93; 176-200	HKUST; CUHK; HKU; PolyU; CityU; HKBU
Engineering & Technology	18 30 59 60	HKUST HKU CUHK CityU	23; 40; 61; 63; 70	HKUST; HKU; CityU; CUHK; PolyU
Clinical, Pre-clinical & Health	31 63	HKU CUHK	29; 49; 301-400; 401-500	HKU; CUHK; PolyU; HKBU
Physical Sciences	46 57 66	HKU CUHK HKUST	49; 54; 58; 98; 151-175; 251-300	CUHK; HKU; HKUST; CityU; PolyU; HKBU
Law	18 27 52	HKU CUHK CityU	22 45 49	HKU CityU CUHK
Education	4 20	HKU CUHK	4 18	HKU CUHK
Psychology	49 76	HKU CUHK	54 73	HKU CUHK
Social Sciences	30 41 61	HKU CUHK HKUST	26 47 61	HKU CUHK HKUST

== Academic Rankings of World Universities by Subjects (top 200) ==
ARWU Board Subject fields	2013	
Subject	Rank	Institute
Natural Science & Mathematics	101-150	CUHK
Engineering & Computer Sciences	25; 34; 51-75; 76-100; 101-150	CityU; HKUST; CUHK; PolyU; HKU
Life & Agriculture Sciences	151-200	HKU
Clinical Medicine & Pharmacy	151-200; 151-200	HKU; CUHK
Social Sciences	51-75; 76-100; 101-150; 101-150; 101-150	HKUST; PolyU; HKU; CUHK; CityU

ARWU Specific Subjects	2013	
Subject	Rank	Institute
Mathematics	40; 49; 51-75; 151-200	CUHK; CityU; PolyU; HKBU
Physics	-	-
Chemistry	76-100; 76-100; 151-200; 151-200	HKU; CUHK; CityU; HKUST
Computer Sciences	24; 29; 42; 51-75; 51-75; 151-200	HKUST; CUHK; CityU; HKU; PolyU; HKBU
Economics/Business	51-75; 76-100; 101-150; 101-150; 101-150	HKUST; CityU; HKU; CUHK; PolyU

ARWU Specific Subjects	2018	
Subject	Rank	Institute
Computer Science & Engineering	19; 38; 49; 51-75; 51-75; 201-300	CUHK; CityU; PolyU; HKUST; HKU; HKBU
