= Chinese University of Hong Kong Chorus =

The Chinese University of Hong Kong Chorus
- Choir
- Origin: Hong Kong
- Founded: 1972 (54 years ago)
- Genre: classical, Chinese music, Cantonese choral music
- Music director: Leon Chu
- Affiliation: The Chinese University of Hong Kong
- Awards: IFPI Hong Kong Top Sales Music Award 2014
- Website: www.cuchorus.org.hk

The Chinese University of Hong Kong Chorus (a.k.a. CU Chorus, formerly named The Student Chorus, the Student Union of the Chinese University of Hong Kong, Chinese: 香港中文大學合唱團 a.k.a. 中大合唱團) is founded by a group of students of the Chinese University of Hong Kong in December 1972.

For each season, the chorus would have its Annual Concert and Christmas Concert held respectively on the middle and the end of a year. While the former one would have a showcase on serious choral music chosen with selected artistic themes, the latter one would be a demonstration of the chorus' vividness and ability in engaging a pop, contemporary style featuring arrangements of Christmas pieces.

The most recent Annual Concert and Christmas Concert would be respectively "The Music of Jan Tien-hao" held in June 2014 and "CU Chorus x Howard McCrary", featuring the Grammy-nominated jazz musician Howard McCrary with a good number of jazz arrangements from traditional Christmas songs in December 2012.

Throughout the years, the chorus encompasses a repertoire ranging from Renaissance motets to Mahlerian choral symphonies (the chorus is the first university chorus in Hong Kong which has performed all choral symphonies of Mahler), up to the most avant-garde pieces from composers all over the world. As the pioneer of contemporary choral music, the chorus commissions young Hong Kong composers for new works every year. Recent commission works includes Dennis Wu's Below the Kau To Shan, Andy So's The Flower of Love, Samson Young's When He Said etc., with the most recent one being Lok-yin Tang's Frozen Tears I and II.

To lay a better foundation for its never-ending artistic pursuit, CU Chorus established charitable organization status with "CU Chorus Association" (a limited company) in January 2012. The new governing body, with its finer division of labour in artistic, management and administrative aspects, could facilitate the collaboration of CUHK undergraduates, postgraduates and alumni in their efforts to boost CU Chorus—a group coming from and basing in CUHK—to ever-greater artistic heights.

== Attention from Israel ==
In May 2009, the chorus won high praise in Israel because of a video clip that its members posted on YouTube.

The YouTube video clip documents a performance of Choral Selection from Schindler's List (sung in Hebrews and Yiddish) by the chorus in 2007, and the clip was posted immediately after the performance.

Shortly before the Holocaust Day 2009, after the film had been on the site for a long time without drawing much attention, it was discovered by an Israeli viewer who had started to distribute it via Email to his friends as "A Chinese choir performs songs in Hebrew to celebrate Holocaust Day". Within a few days, the film became a great hit in Israel and had over 100,000 viewings in Israel and abroad within one month, it also receiving hundreds of moving reactions by Israelis and Jews.

The popularity of the clip attracted a broad media coverage, including a news article by Yedioth Ahronoth, the best-selling newspaper in Israel.

== Selected repertoire ==
- Ludwig van Beethoven: Symphony No. 9 in D minor, Op. 125, "Choral"
- Gustav Mahler: Symphony No. 2 in C minor, "Resurrection"
- Gustav Mahler: Symphony No. 3 in D minor (Thailand première)
- Gustav Mahler: Symphony No. 8 in E flat major (Hong Kong and Macao première)
- Wolfgang Amadeus Mozart: Requiem, K626
- Wolfgang Amadeus Mozart: Mass in C major, K317, "Coronation"
- Arvo Pärt: Which was the son of...
- Andy So: The Flower of Love (World première in 2008 Shanghai Concert)
- Igor Stravinsky: Symphony of Psalms
- Xian Xinghai: Yellow River Cantata (original version, Moscow version)
- Dennis Wu: Below the Kau To Shan (World première in 2008 Annual Concert)
- Samson Young: When He Said (World première in 2009 Annual Concert)
- Lok-yin Tang: Frozen Tears I, II (World première in 2012 and 2013 Annual Concert respectively)
- Ng Wah-hei: The Blossom (World première in 2013 Annual Concert)
- Jan Tien-hao: Dream Catcher (World première in 2014 Annual Concert)

== Touring record ==
- 1977: University of the Philippines Diliman (Manila), University of the Philippines Baguio (Baguio)
- 1987: National Taiwan University (Taipei)
- 1991: National Cheng Kung University (Tainan)
- 1994: Central Conservatory of Music (Beijing), Tsinghua University (Beijing)
- 1996: National Taiwan University (Taipei), National Cheng Kung University (Tainan)
- 1997: Nanjing Union Theological Seminary (Nanjing)
- 2001: National University of Singapore (Singapore), Singapore Bible College (Singapore), Guangzhou University (Guangzhou)
- 2003: Shanghai Jiao Tong University (Shanghai)
- 2006: Shih Hsin University (Taipei)
- 2007: Macao International Music Festival (Macao), Sun Yat-sen University (Guangzhou)
- 2008: Shanghai Normal University (Shanghai)
- 2009: Dayeh University (Changhua County), Taipei Fushin Private School (Taipei)
- 2010: Siam Philharmonic (Bangkok)
- 2011: Crescendo Voices (Johor Bahru)
- 2013: Taichung Chamber Choir (Taichung)
- 2014: National Tainan University (Tainan)
- 2015: Shanghai Spring International Music Festival (Shanghai)
- 2018: National Taiwan Normal University, Taipei Contemporary Choir (Taipei)
- 2019: Taipei International Choral Festival (Taipei)
