= Orientation camps in Hong Kong =

Camps to welcome new students

In Hong Kong's universities and higher education institutions, orientation camps (Chinese: 迎新營), also known as “Ocamp”, are held by different student organisations in order to welcome new students before their first academic year. There are different types of orientation camps. “Big ocamps” (大O) are organised by the students' union or constituent colleges, while “small ocamp” (細O) are usually organised by faculty or departmental societies with a view to welcome students who study in the same faculty. The duration of camps is usually two to seven days.

The aim of organising Ocamps is to enable freshmen in meeting new friends through getting along with a group of freshmen in the camp. Also, it aims to let freshmen understand and then adapt to the lifestyle and culture in university. It also boosts the sense of belonging of students to the university. Furthermore, some Ocamps like to spread messages to students, for example, standing up against injustice etc.

== History ==
There is no accurate information about the first orientation camp in Hong Kong but the earliest camp recorded was in the 1970s, held by University of Hong Kong. Then other universities started organising it following Hong Kong University.

== Group Mother and Father ==
In each group, there will be two to four group leaders, mostly voluntary senior students (Year 2 or above) and also some alumni. They are known as “Group Mother” (組媽) and “Group Father” (組爸) as their role in the groups is to take care of the freshmen, i.e. the “group sons” (組仔) and “group daughters” (組女). They also have to design and create some handy gifts to the freshmen such as bags, hand fans and bracelets, which represent their groups.

== Dem Beat ==
Dem beat (demonstration of beat), also known as dem cheers in some universities, means shouting slogans with a certain beat or rhythm created by claps and steps. All groups (either as university houses or colleges) have their own beat. The aim of this activity is to promote team spirit and togetherness.

== Campfire ==
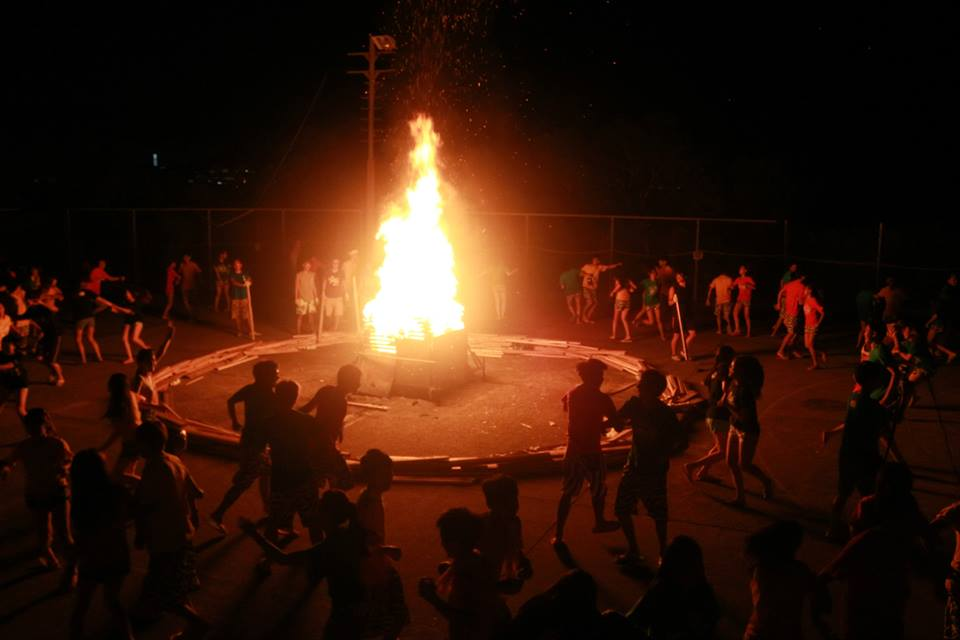
Students forming a circle surrounding the fire.

“Campfire” is held at night in which house captains start a fire together with torches and then all participants form a circle surrounding the fire and dance with music. Some common songs are My Bonnie Lies over the Ocean, Dschinghis Khan (Cantonese version) and Pieces of Sea Wave and Spray. Before the activity ends, captains will share their feelings towards the camp.

== Game ==
=== Situation Game ===
Situation Game, known as “Sit. Game”, in which committees of the camp first gather all participants in a venue, usually a sports centre. The committees deceive the participants by creating a situation that all group leaders have to leave the camp immediately. Group leaders sometimes cry in front of the participants to make the situation more convincing. They then ask freshmen to speak out if there is any solution towards the situation. Before the committees announce the truth, they let participant enjoy their “last moment” with their leaders. Situation Game aims to teach and encourage participants to stand out and give voice to unfairness. Besides, it consolidates the relationship in groups including participants and group leaders.

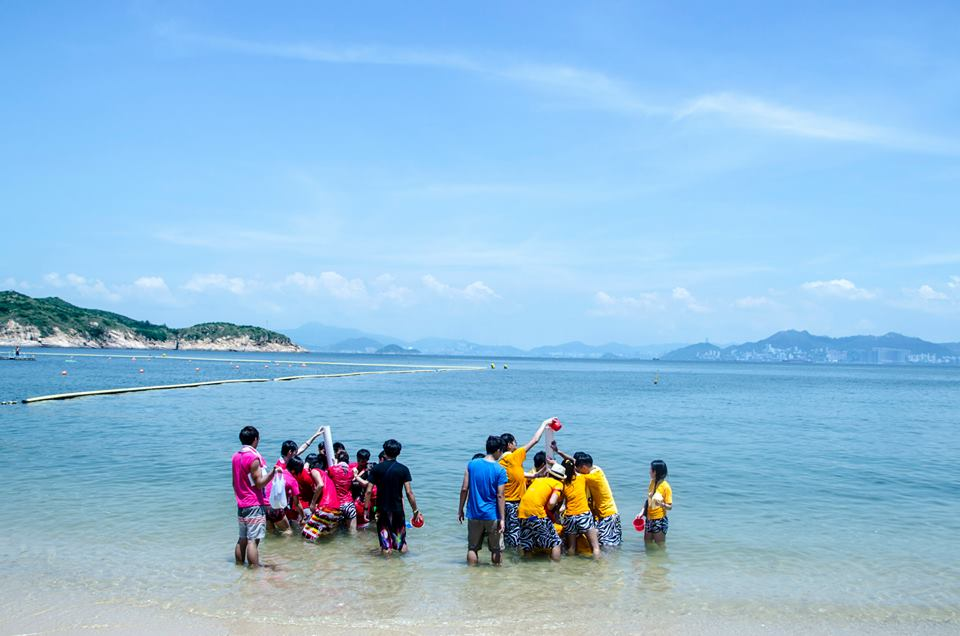
Students playing with each other at the beach.

=== Hong Kong Hunt ===
Students are required to complete different tasks set by the committee as they run around in the city in limited time. By completing each task, students can get a certain score. At the end of the day, the team getting the highest score will be crowned with championship.

=== Water Game ===
Water game (水戰) is a common game in orientation camp. It is the game playing with water such as playing in the beach or playing with water guns. Participants will absolutely get wet.

=== Room Game ===
As a pastime after the conclusion of all planned activities in a day, “room games" (房 Game) are often played. Room games often last overnight. Participants will follow committees' instructions and play. Usually the games involve some penalties for the losers.

Popular room activities include "First Impression".

== Controversy ==
In recent years, orientation camps have become associated with sexual misconduct, particularly involving the power difference between older and younger students.

For example, in 2004 Hong Kong Polytechnic University's Health and Social Sciences Faculty freshmen were asked to kiss strangers on the lips, some of whom might develop a bad feeling during such an activity.

Besides, games requiring close contact between the participants have been long described as being obscene and having too much intimacy. These include the “caterpillar game” as both the girls and boys in participation are required to wrap their legs around one another's waist. Another example is the ‘jumbo’ held by students at Hong Kong University of Science and Technology (HKUST) in 2013, where the females were asked to lay down above the male's body.

Activities of cheers have also been condemned by some mass media for the inappropriate slogans used by students, which simply aim to verbally abuse the others. For example, in 2002, in the ocamp held by the Chinese University of Hong Kong (CUHK), students from Shaw College slandered girls from New Asia College with the use of chants. Some wordings were said to be even discriminating the disabled. According to a daily news article, the Chairperson of Joint Committee on New Student Orientation of CUHK, Kenneth W.Y. Leung, responded that the committee will explain the problems instead of launching a censorship as they believe the self-discipline of students.

In 2023 the controversy reemerged when numerous sexual assaults, including rape, took place at multiple universities during their orientation camps.
