= United College Wu Chung Library =

Academic library in Hong Kong

- 聯合書院胡忠圖書館
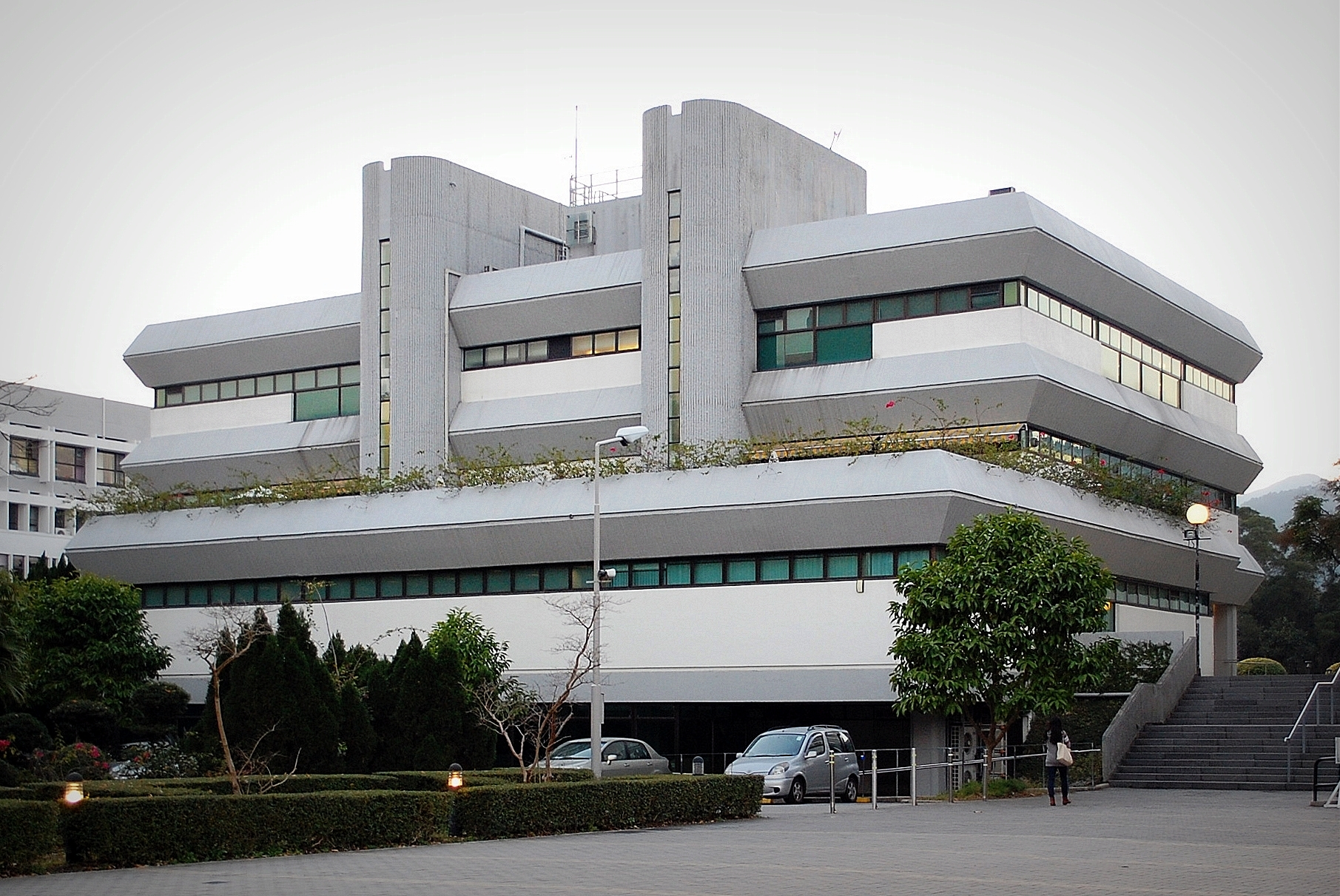
- Wu Chung Library
- 22.42090645548497°N 114.20482028098537°E
- Location: Ma Liu Shui, Hong Kong
- Type: Academic library
- Established: 1956

Other information
- Affiliation: Chinese University of Hong Kong
- Website: lib.cuhk.edu.hk/ucl

United College Wu Chung Library (聯合書院胡忠圖書館; noted as UCL) is the library of the United College of the Chinese University of Hong Kong (CUHK).

As one of the seven libraries in CUHK and named after Wu Chung, the United College Library houses the Philosophy collection, major Chinese monograph series collection and General Education collection, and provides facilities including 24-Hour study facilities, Group Study Rooms and Outdoor Reading Area.

== Background ==
The United College Library was first founded in 1956 and located at Caine Road, Hong Kong. In 1972, with a donation by Wu Chung, the Library was named as the Wu Chung Library and moved into its present campus in Shatin. The Library was renamed as the Wu Chung Multimedia Library to house the collection of audiovisual materials in 2001. On 1 July 2018, after distributing the multimedia collection to other CUHK Libraries according to the subject designation of the materials, the Library reverted to its original name as the Wu Chung Library.

== Resources and facilities ==
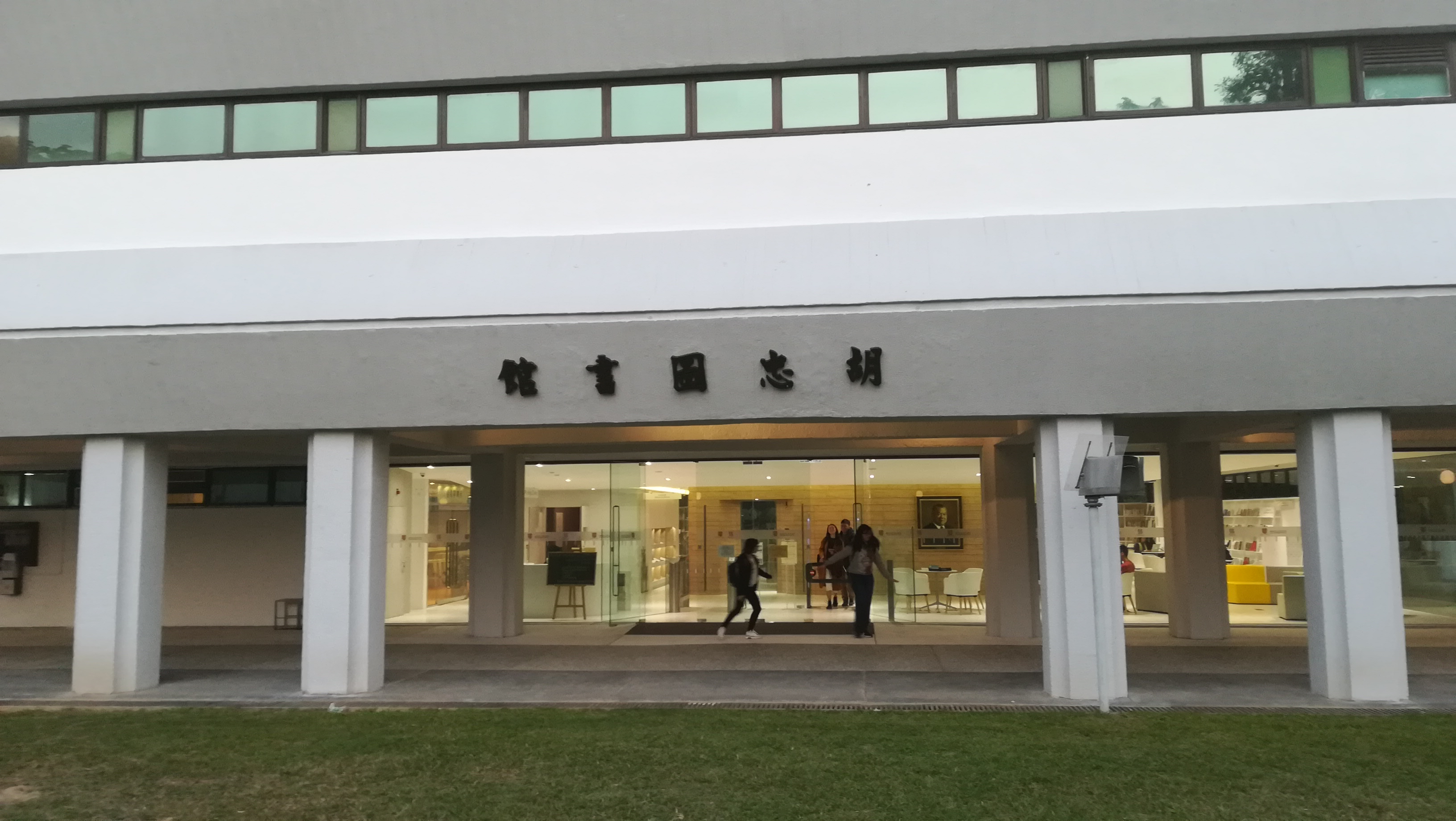
Main entrance

After transforming from a multimedia library to a humanities-based library, the Wu Chung Library now houses the collections on Philosophy, Classical Chinese Reference (AC Class) and General Education.

The redesigned library applies the frameless transparent window walls, which located on the lower ground floor and the ground floor, to merge the indoor and outdoor for users to enjoy the waterfall and greenery. The 24-Hour study is located on the lower ground floor with IT rich facilities, three booths, and the learning cluster provide collaborative learning environment. The ground floor houses a cluster of computing facilities together with collaborative study space and five Group Study Rooms, as well as the Tien Chi Microcomputer Laboratory. On the first floor, it offers the Outdoor Reading Area, the Seminar Room and the Independent Learning Centre. The second floor provides further collaborative study place and six Faculty Study Rooms.
