= Collegiate university =

Form of university organisation

A collegiate university is a university where functions are divided between a central administration and a number of constituent colleges. Historically, the first collegiate university was the University of Paris and its first college was the Collège des Dix-Huit. The two principal forms are residential college universities, where the central university is responsible for teaching and colleges may deliver some teaching but are primarily residential communities, and federal universities where the central university has an administrative (and sometimes examining) role and the colleges may be residential but are primarily teaching institutions. The larger colleges or campuses of federal universities, such as University College London and University of California, Berkeley, are effectively universities in their own right and often have their own student unions.

For universities with residential colleges, the principal difference between these and non-collegiate halls of residence (or dormitories) is that "colleges are societies (Latin collegia), not buildings". This is expressed in different ways in different universities; commonly students are members of a college, not residents of a college, and remain members whether they are living in the college or not, but this is not universal and the distinction may be drawn in other ways (see, e.g., the University of Otago below). Residential colleges also commonly have members drawn from the university's academic staff in order to form a whole academic community. Students in residential colleges are often organised into a junior common room, with postgraduate students in a middle common room, and academic staff forming a senior common room.

== History ==
The development of the collegiate university in western Europe followed shortly after the development of the medieval university itself. The first college to be established was the Collège des Dix-Huit at the University of Paris, founded in 1180 by John of London shortly after he had returned from Jerusalem. This has led to the suggestion that the college was inspired by madrasas he saw on his travels, although this has been disputed, particularly as, unlike madrasas, the early Paris colleges did not teach. Other colleges appeared in Paris shortly after this, including the College of St Thomas du Louvre (1186) and the College of the Good Children of St Honore (1208–1209) – although these may both have had more of the character of grammar schools than colleges of the university – various monastic colleges starting with the Dominicans in 1217, and the College of Sorbonne for non-monastic theology students in 1257. From Paris, the idea spread to Oxford, where William of Durham, who had been a Regent Master of Theology at Paris, left a legacy to found University College, Oxford in 1249. Although this is taken as the foundation date of University College, it was not until after 1280 that the college actually began operating. At around the same time Balliol College was founded by John de Balliol via a grant of land in 1263 as a penance imposed by the Bishop of Durham, and Merton College was founded with an endowment by Walter de Merton in 1264.

These original Oxford colleges were "merely endowed boardinghouses for impoverished scholars", and were limited to those who had already received their Bachelor of Arts degree and were reading for higher degrees (usually theology). It was not until 1305 that teaching started in the College of Navarre in Paris, an innovation that reached Oxford in 1379 with the foundation of New College – also the first college there to take undergraduate students. In Bologna and other Italian universities, the colleges, as Rashdall put it, "remained to the last (what all Colleges were originally intended to be) eleemosynary institutions for the help of poor students, boarding-houses and not places of education" and never acquired the same importance as the colleges of Oxford or Paris.

Colleges evolved in different directions in different places, but many European universities lost their colleges in the early 18th century. At the University of Coimbra, for example, many colleges were established in the 16th century, although these were limited to the study of theology with the other faculties remaining non-collegiate. These colleges, joined by others in the 17th and 18th centuries, persisted until 1834, when they (along with the religious orders that ran then) were suppressed following the Portuguese civil war. The colleges of Paris were closed along with the university itself and the rest of the French universities after the French Revolution, as were the colleges of the University of Salamanca.

While the continental universities retained control over their colleges, in England it was the colleges that came to dominate the universities. The Hebdomadal Board was established by William Laud at Oxford in 1631 with the intent of diluting the influence of Congregation (the assembly of regent masters) and Convocation (the assembly of all graduates). This led to criticism in the 19th century, with William Hamilton alleging that the colleges had unlawfully usurped the functions of the universities as the tutors had taken over the teaching from the professors. Royal Commissions in the 1850s led to Acts of Parliament in 1854 (for Oxford) and 1856 (for Cambridge) that, among other measures, limited the power of the colleges.

Prior to these reforms, however, the first two new universities in England for over 600 years were established, both offering new versions of the collegiate university. The University of Durham was founded in 1832, taking Oxford for its model, and University College, Durham was created at the same time. This college, unlike those of Oxford and Cambridge, was not legally distinct from the university and nor was it responsible for teaching, which was carried out by university professors rather than college tutors. This restored the teaching role of the central university that had been lost at Oxford and Cambridge and the original role of the college as a residential rather than educational institution (cf. Rashdall's comments on the Bologna colleges, above). It also pioneered the concept of residential colleges being owned by the university rather than being established as independent corporations, which provided a useful model for modern institutions looking to establish colleges. Unlike the earlier foundation of Trinity College Dublin, which had been established as "the mother of a university" but to which no other colleges had ever been added, the Durham system allowed for the university itself to found further colleges, which it did with the establishment of Hatfield College in 1846.

The University of London, founded in 1836, was very different. It was, in its original form, an examining body for affiliated colleges. The first two of these - University College London (UCL; founded 1826) and King's College London (founded 1829) were already in existence and resembled non-collegiate 'unitary' universities, as found in Scotland and continental Europe, except in their lack of degree-awarding powers. There had been much dispute over UCL's attempt to gain recognition as a university, and the University of London was designed as a political solution to put an end to this dispute and to enable the students at both UCL and King's to receive degrees. It was modelled to a certain extent on Cambridge, where (at that time) the senate of the university was responsible for examinations and the colleges for the teaching, and also took on some features of the University of France, an institution established under Napoleon in 1808 that had absorbed the formerly independent French universities as "academies" within a single university structure. Unlike Oxford and Cambridge, the affiliated colleges of London (which were spread across the country, not confined to London) were not constituent parts of the university and had no say in its running. Another major difference was that both UCL and King's were non-residential, providing teaching but not accommodation. This would provide the model for the civic colleges that were established in the major English cities, which later became the redbrick universities. After 1858 the requirement for colleges to be affiliated was dropped and London degrees were available to anyone who could pass the examinations. It was not until 1900 that London, after a period of sustained pressure from the teaching institutions in London, became a federal university. The London pattern spread the idea of the examining university with affiliated colleges around the British Empire, in particular to Canada where the University of Toronto was refounded as an examining university, its teaching arm becoming University College, Toronto, which federated other colleges in the region, and to India, where the universities of Calcutta, Madras and Bombay were founded in 1857, and New Zealand, where the federal University of New Zealand was established in 1874.

A modification of the University of London plan was used for the Queen's University of Ireland, established in 1850. This took in three newly established colleges: the Queen's Colleges of Belfast, Cork and Galway. This was more federal than London, but proved inflexible and was replaced in 1880 by the Royal University of Ireland, which was an examining university based more directly on London. Also in 1880 another federal university, the Victoria University, was established in the north of England to solve the problem of Owen's College, Manchester, seeking university status. This originally just took in Owen's College, but grew to take in university colleges in Leeds and Liverpool. However, it unravelled in 1903-4 after Birmingham successfully became England's first unitary university, with the three colleges all becoming universities in their own right.

The federal University of Wales was created in 1893 as a national university for Wales, taking in pre-existing colleges in Aberystwyth, Cardiff and Bangor that had been preparing students for London degrees. It lasted as a federal university until 2007, when it became a confederal non-membership degree-awarding body. The University of Durham became a very curious federal institution in 1908 – its Durham division was itself collegiate, while its Newcastle division had two independent colleges (Armstrong College, the civic university college affiliated to Durham since its creation in 1871, and the Medical College, which had been affiliated since the 1850s). The two colleges of the Newcastle division were merged in 1937, and Newcastle finally became an independent university in 1963. Similarly, the university college in Dundee, founded 1881, became a college of the University of St Andrews in 1897 before becoming an independent university in 1967.

The idea of the residential college spread to America in the early 20th century, with Harvard and Yale both establishing colleges (called "houses" at Harvard) in the 1930s. Like the Durham colleges, these were colleges established and owned by the universities with only limited involvement in teaching. The American state university systems also developed federal-style universities with autonomous campuses (although normally not legally independent). As these systems often developed from a single original campus, this often became identified as the 'flagship' campus of the state system.

== Types of collegiate university ==
An early typology of British university institutions by the Principal of the University of Edinburgh in 1870 divided them into three types: collegiate (Oxford, Cambridge and Durham), professorial (the Scottish universities – St Andrews, Glasgow, Aberdeen and Edinburgh – and the new colleges in Manchester and London) and non-teaching examination boards (London). However, even at that time drawing hard lines was difficult: Oxford had, until a few years prior to this, been an examination board for its colleges, and Trinity College Dublin combined elements of the collegiate and professorial styles. More recently, the collegiate and federal traditions have been seen as separate in Britain, although both inspired by different aspects of the colleges at Oxford and Cambridge, e.g. "With the partial exception of Durham (and in the twentieth century York, Kent and Lancaster) there has been no serious attempt to create in Britain a collegial tradition in the mode of Oxbridge, but the federal principle has been widely emulated." Similarly a conference on The Collegiate Way in 2014 concentrated entirely on universities with residential colleges (e.g. Oxford, Cambridge, Durham, etc.), making no mention of federal universities. This was in keeping with the idea that "The collegiate way is the notion that a curriculum, a library, a faculty, and students are not enough to make a college. It is an adherence to the residential scheme of things."

Yet the federal principle has also been called the "Cambridge principle", and is sometimes seen as essential to a collegiate university. There is also dispute as to what is meant by a federal university: some writers have argued that the distinct feature of a federal system is the separation of teaching and examination, but others see the distinction as being one of governance and distribution of authority. A distinction is sometimes made between federal universities, collegiate universities (where the college is the primary academic unit, i.e. Oxford and Cambridge) and universities that have residential colleges but where these do not participate in teaching. One definition of a collegiate university states that "it's the sense of community within a big environment that's the common feature".

=== Collegiate universities with centralised teaching ===
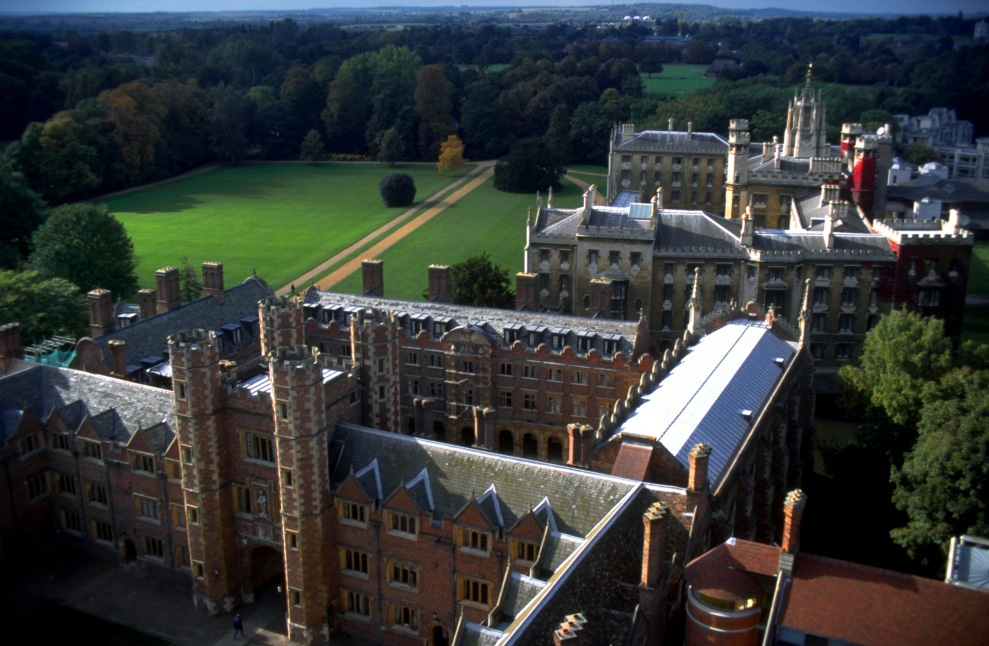
Buildings of St John's College, Cambridge

In many collegiate universities, the teaching is centrally organised through departments and faculties on a university-wide basis. The level of participation in teaching of colleges in such universities varies: they may provide no formal teaching (e.g. Durham), may provide some teaching to their own students (the Oxbridge model), may provide some teaching that is available university or faculty-wide (e.g. Toronto), or may be responsible for delivering centrally organised, university-wide teaching (e.g. Roehampton). Whatever their role in teaching, almost all are residential communities and they will often have their own halls for meals, libraries, sports teams and societies; such colleges are thus sometimes termed residential colleges. Monash University in Australia has, however, developed a non-residential college model, and New York University has similar "learning communities" to support non-residential students. The specifics of how the collegiate system is organised – whether college membership is necessary for students, whether colleges are legally independent, the role colleges play in admissions, etc. – vary widely between different universities.

While the ancient universities of Oxford and Cambridge consist of independent colleges that supplement the university's teaching with their own tutorials, some universities have built colleges that do not provide teaching but still perform much of the housing and social duties. Such colleges are planned, built and funded entirely by the central administration and are thus dependent on it, however they still retain their own administrative structures and have a degree of independence. This system was pioneered at Durham University in the United Kingdom in the 1830s, and has been described as "a far better model for people at other institutions to look to, than are the independent colleges of Oxford and Cambridge". This has been widely followed in the US, where the colleges at universities such as Harvard, Yale and Princeton are entirely owned by the central university. Some universities, such as the University of Otago in New Zealand, Durham University in the UK and the University of Pavia in Italy have a mix of independent and university-owned (or, in the case of Pavia, state-owned) colleges.

In many collegiate universities, following the pattern of Oxford and Cambridge, membership of a college is obligatory for students, but in others it is either not necessary or only necessary for students in particular faculties, e.g. at the University of Toronto, where the colleges are all associated with the Faculty of Arts and Sciences.

=== Non-centralised teaching collegiate universities ===
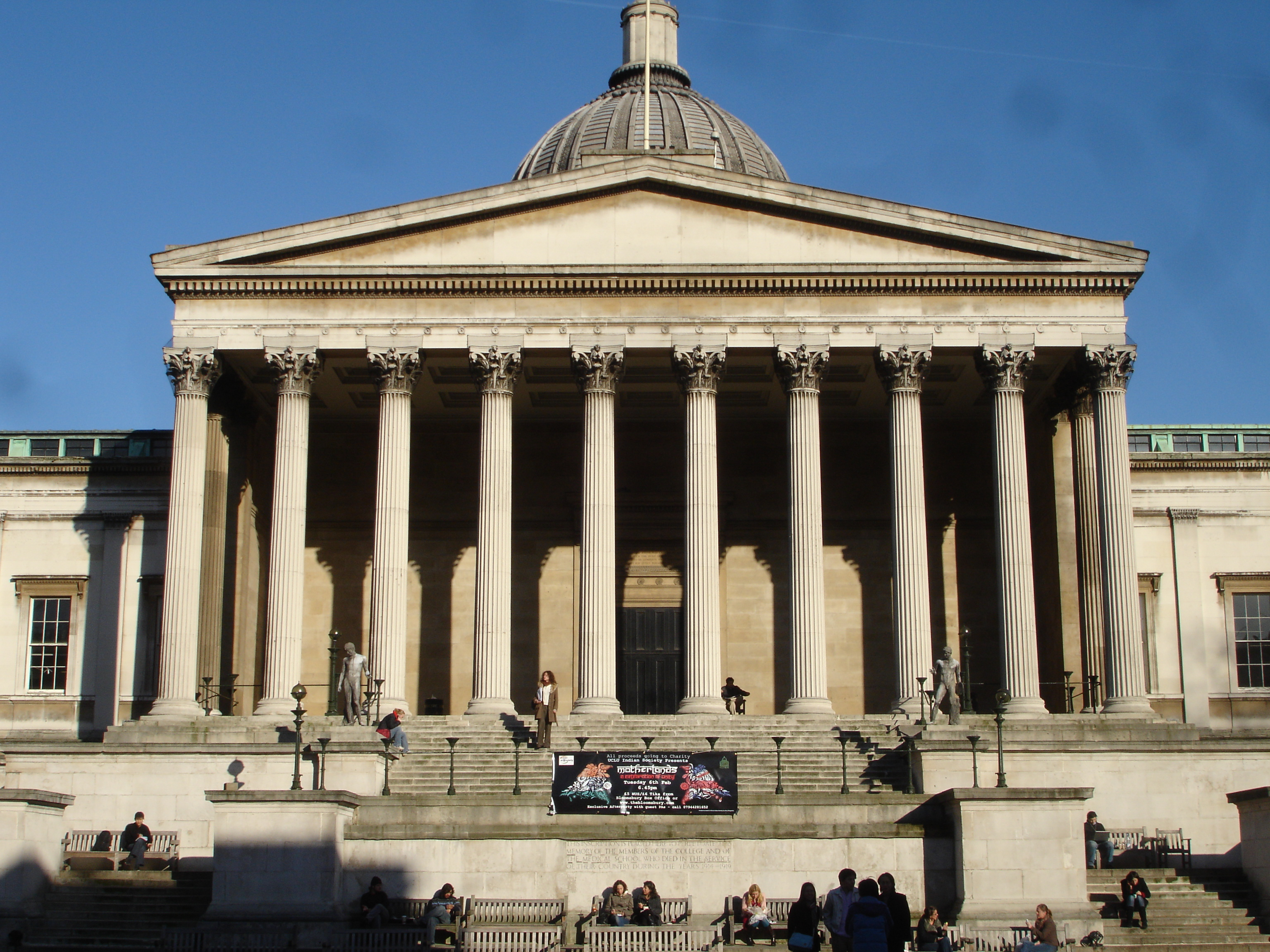
University College London

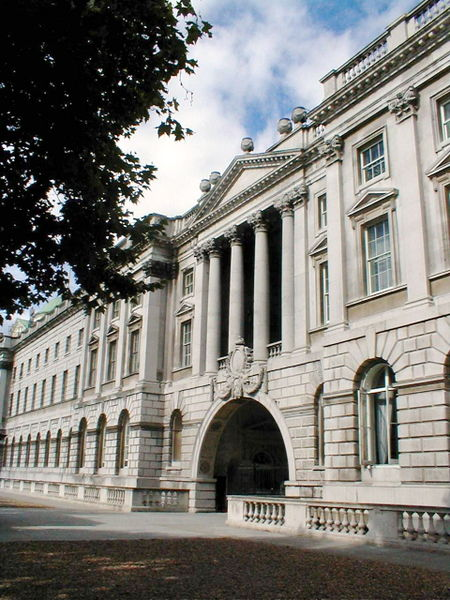
King's College London

Sometimes, as noted above, referred to as federal universities, these are universities where the teaching function is entirely carried out by constituent colleges, which will often have their own faculties and departments. This is represented by examples such as Oxford and Cambridge up to the mid 19th century, the University of Wales from 1893 to 2007, and the University of London from 1900. The level of legal separation – e.g. whether the colleges are separate corporate bodies – varies between universities. As the colleges are primarily teaching institutions, they may not always be residential communities and many are effectively universities in their own right.

Some colleges are part of loose federations that allow them to exercise nearly complete self-governance, and even (as in the case of colleges of the University of London) award their own degrees. Other colleges are not legally separate from their parent university, e.g. the University of the Arts, London (UAL) in the UK and many state university systems in the US. In some US state systems, a "flagship campus" may be identified – often the original campus of the system – which is considered (either officially or informally) to stand above the other campuses in the system (e.g. University of Wisconsin–Madison, University of Colorado Boulder).

Some universities may have centralised teaching but also have colleges that do not access that centralised teaching. Historically, this was the case at Durham University for the medical school and Armstrong College in the late 19th and early 20th century (prior to the formation of a true federal university in 1908) and for University College Stockton from 1994 to 2001. The two colleges of Queen's University Belfast, which is for the main part a unitary university, currently operate in this manner. This should not be confused with the situation where courses at an independent college are validated by a university but the college does not become part of that university, e.g. the relationship between the New College of the Humanities and Southampton Solent University from 2015 to 2020.

Over time, the level of federation may evolve, particularly as independent colleges grow and seek to establish themselves as universities in their own right. University College London and King's College London were for much of the 20th century dependent colleges of the central university, without separate legal identities, and all London colleges received funds through the University of London rather than directly. The trend since the latter half of the 20th century has been for increased decentralisation; taken to its ultimate, this has led some colleges to formally end their relations with the parent university to become degree-awarding universities. Examples include Cardiff University (formerly the University of Wales, Cardiff) and Imperial College London (formerly a college of the University of London). Similarly Newcastle University was part of the federal University of Durham until 1963 and the University of Dundee was a college of the University of St Andrews until 1967. A number of autonomous universities in South Africa were formerly colleges of the University of South Africa. Many of the US state systems started as single campuses but have evolved to become federal systems, and the University of the Philippines similarly started as one campus but is now a system of "constituent universities".

== Collegiate universities around the world ==
There are around 80 universities around the world with residential college systems.

=== Argentina ===
In Argentina, the first educational institution to host this administrative format was IUNA Instituto Universitario Nacional de las Artes, since 2014 renamed UNA National University of the Arts, in Spanish: UNA - Universidad Nacional de las Artes, established in 1993 as a Collegiate University, incorporation of various national institutions dedicated to the teaching of fine arts. The origins of the current UNA University lay in the 1875 founding of the National Society of the Stimulus of the Arts by painters Eduardo Schiaffino, Eduardo Sívori, and others. Their guild was rechartered as the National Academy of Fine Arts in 1905 and, then in 1923, on the initiative of painter and academic Ernesto de la Cárcova, created as a department of arts extension education in the University of Buenos Aires, known as the Superior Art School of the Nation in Spanish "Escuela Nacional Superior de las Artes".

=== Australia ===
In Australia, many universities have residential college systems, often combining independent (frequently denominational) and university-owned colleges. Some universities also have non-collegiate residences. Collegiate universities include the University of Queensland, the University of Tasmania, the University of Western Australia, the University of Sydney, the University of Melbourne, the Australian National University and the University of New South Wales. The ANU also operates a non-residential college, as does Monash University, for students living off campus.

=== Bangladesh ===
In Bangladesh, the National University, Bangladesh is a public collegiate university that was established in 1992 by an Act of Parliament as an affiliating university of the country to impart graduate and post-graduate level education to the students through its affiliated colleges, schools and professional institutions throughout the country. It is the second largest university in the world according to enrollment. The headquarters is in Gazipur, on the outskirts of Dhaka. After its establishment, it affiliated association degree awarding colleges, where many of them were previously affiliated by the University of Dhaka, University of Rajshahi and University of Chittagong.

=== Canada ===
In Canada, the University of Toronto has a collegiate system for students in the Faculty of Arts and Science on its St. George campus that took form from the mid 19th century, originally modelled after that of Oxford. Toronto has a mix of independent and dependent colleges, all of which offer academic programmes that are available faculty-wide rather that just to members of that college. While all students of the Faculty of Arts and Science on the St. George campus are members of one of the colleges, students in other undergraduate faculties (Applied Science and Engineering, Architecture, Landscape, and Design, Kinesiology and Physical Education, and Music) are only members of colleges if they live in a college residence, and its Mississauga and Scarborough campuses are non-collegiate.

Trent University in Peterborough, Ontario also has a collegiate model, with five colleges on the Peterborough campus. All students are affiliated to a college.

=== China ===
A notable collegiate university in Mainland China is The Chinese University of Hong Kong, Shenzhen, which inherits the tradition from The Chinese University of Hong Kong in Shatin, Hong Kong.

=== France ===
The number of collegiate universities in France has increased over the past years. These include:

- PSL University (Paris Sciences & Lettres), with its constituent colleges or « Grandes Écoles » including, the École normale supérieure - PSL, Collège de France, Chimie ParisTech - PSL, Mines ParisTech - PSL, Université Paris-Dauphine, Observatoire de Paris and the École pratique des hautes études;
- Paris-Saclay University, with its dependent colleges including, the Paris-Saclay Faculty of Sciences and Paris-Saclay Medical School; and constituent colleges or « Grandes Écoles » including, the École normale supérieure Paris-Saclay, CentraleSupélec, AgroParisTech and the Institut d'optique Graduate School;
- Polytechnic Institute of Paris, with its constituent colleges or « Grandes Écoles » including, the École polytechnique, ENSTA Paris, ENSAE Paris, Télécom Paris and Télécom SudParis;
- Université catholique de Lille, with 5 dependent colleges and 25 constituent colleges.

=== Hong Kong ===
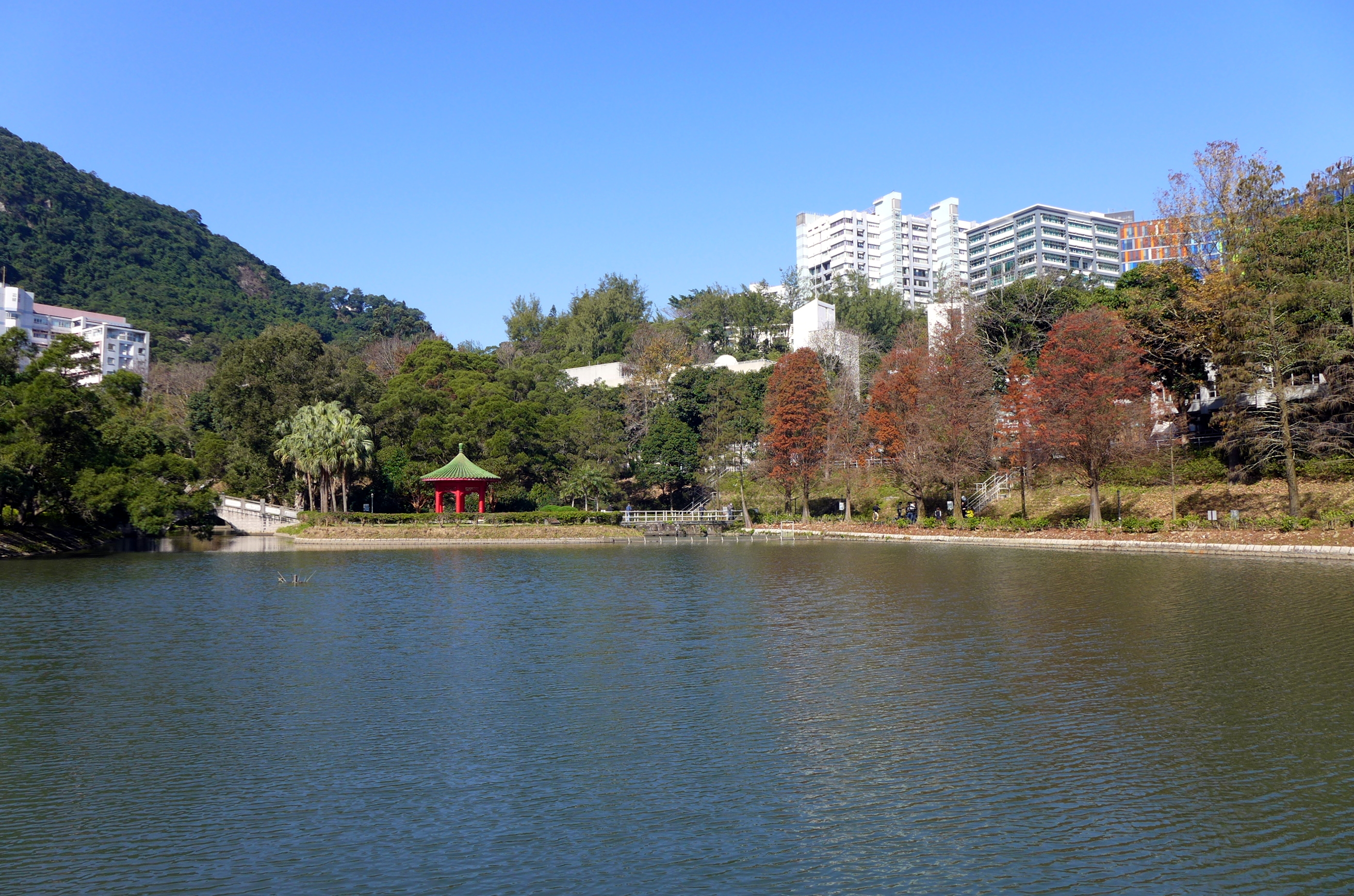
Chung Chi College

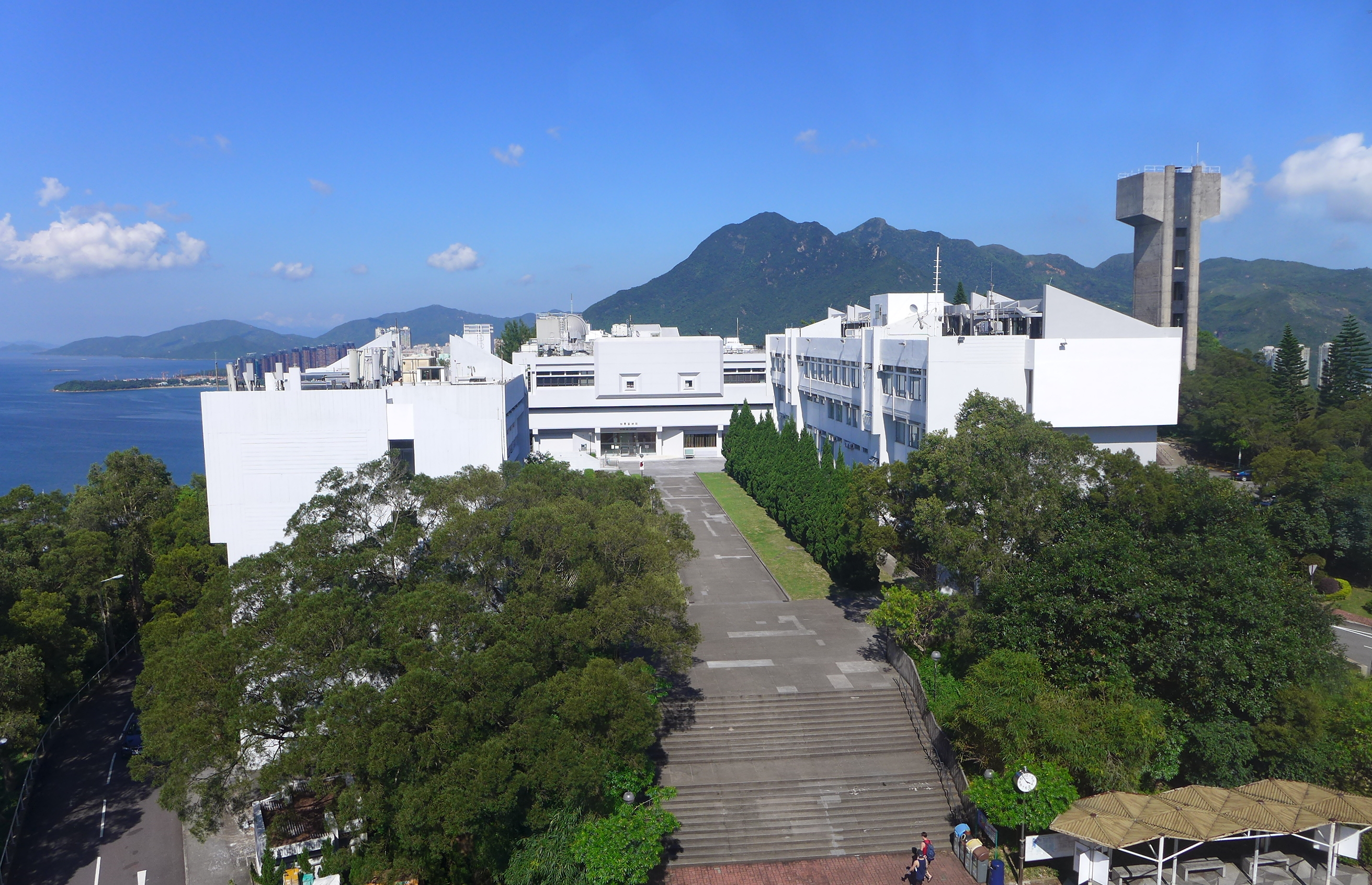
New Asia College

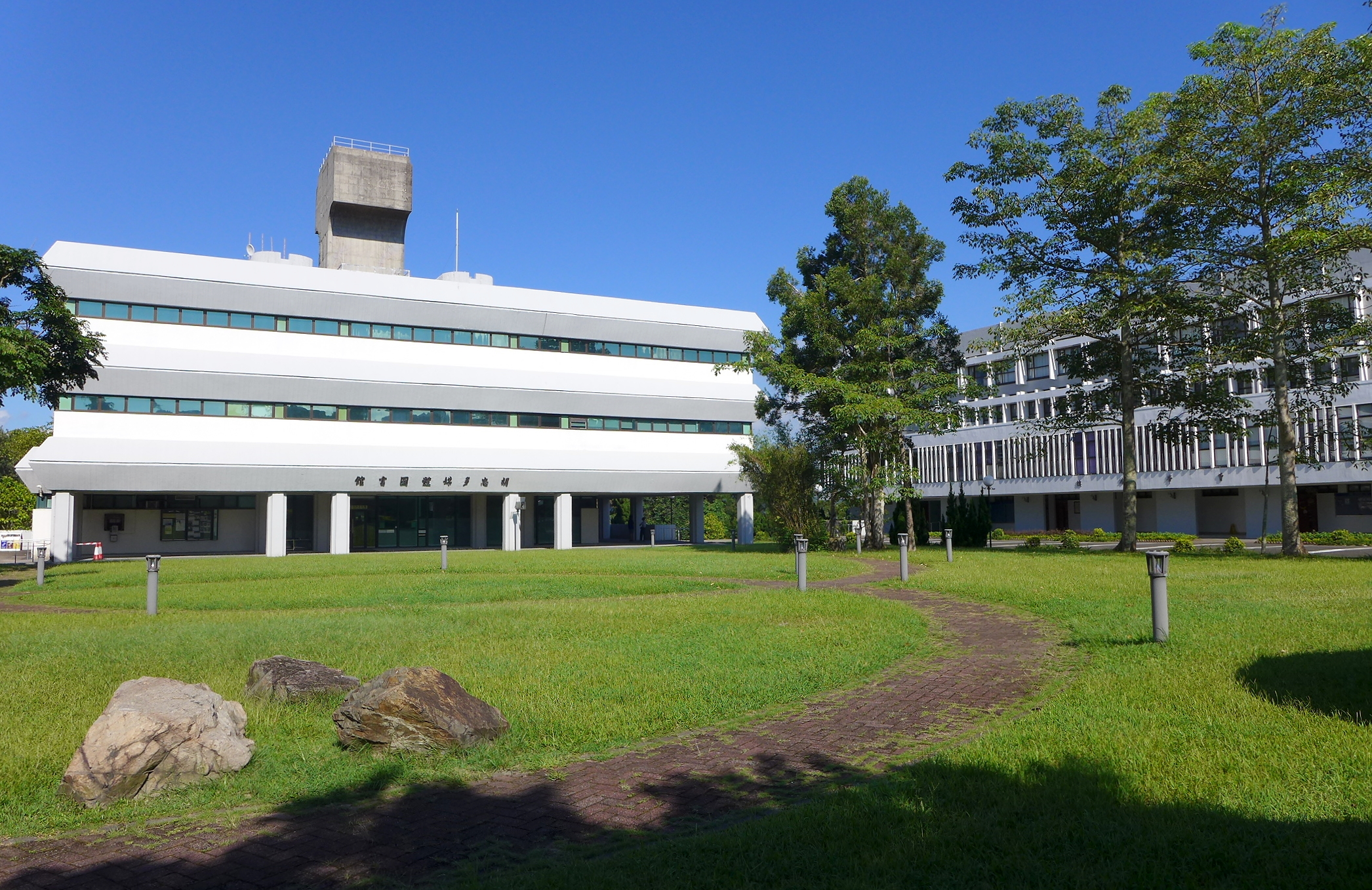
United College

The Chinese University of Hong Kong (CUHK) is the only collegiate university in Hong Kong. It is the city's second-oldest university and derives its collegiate system from its founding in 1963 as a federation of three originally separate colleges – Chung Chi College, New Asia College, and United College In the beginning, CUHK followed the federal university model, where the three constituent colleges had their own academic departments and conducted teaching separately, while the university handled administration, financial matters, and examinations. However, based on the advice of the Second Fulton Report, the teaching departments of the three colleges were gradually merged from 1976. Teaching and research were centralised under the university and the colleges became academic communities responsible for providing pastoral support and non-formal learning opportunities. Currently, CUHK has expanded from three to nine constituent colleges. All full-time undergraduates and academic staff at the university are affiliated with a college, regardless of whether they reside at the college or not.

The University of Hong Kong (HKU) has an affiliated Anglican college, St John's College, which was founded in 1912 and has its own charter. The university also established Robert Black College in 1967 as a university guesthouse. Over the past decade some of the new residential halls were named colleges, including the Lap-Chee College, the Shun Hing College and the Chi Sun College. Centennial College, a provider of post-secondary education, is affiliated with the university. Those not living in the residential colleges do not belong to a college.

The City University of Hong Kong has a Community College, similar to HKU's Centennial College, which been in a partnership arrangement with the University of Wollongong since 2014.

=== India ===
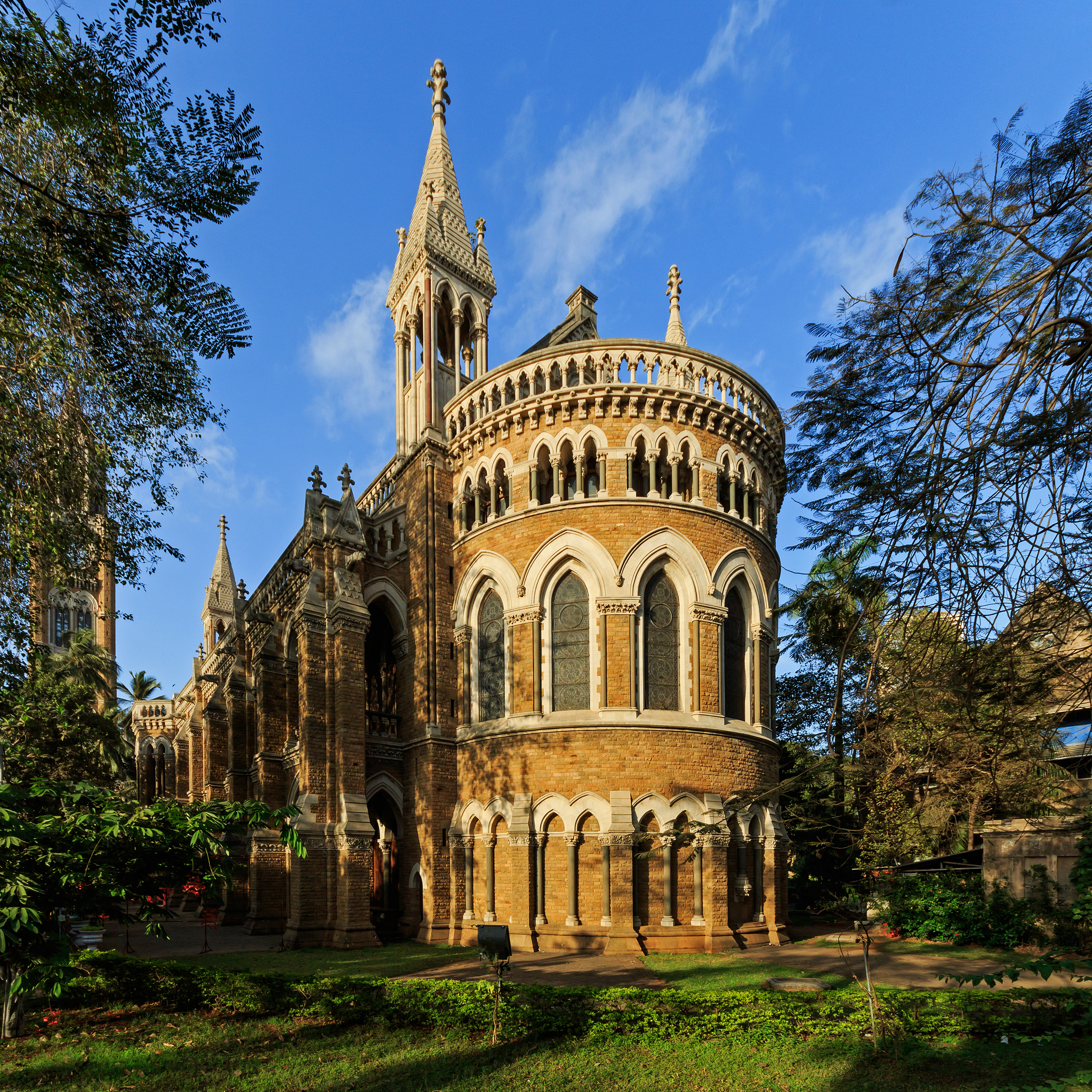
A building of the University of Mumbai

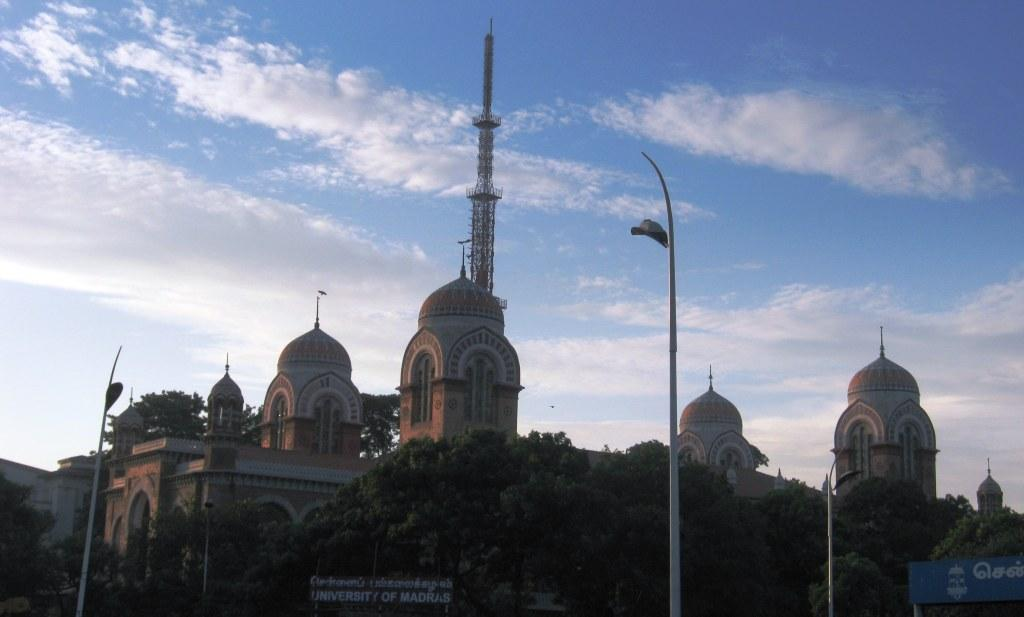
The University of Madras, established 1857, is one of the three oldest modern state universities in India

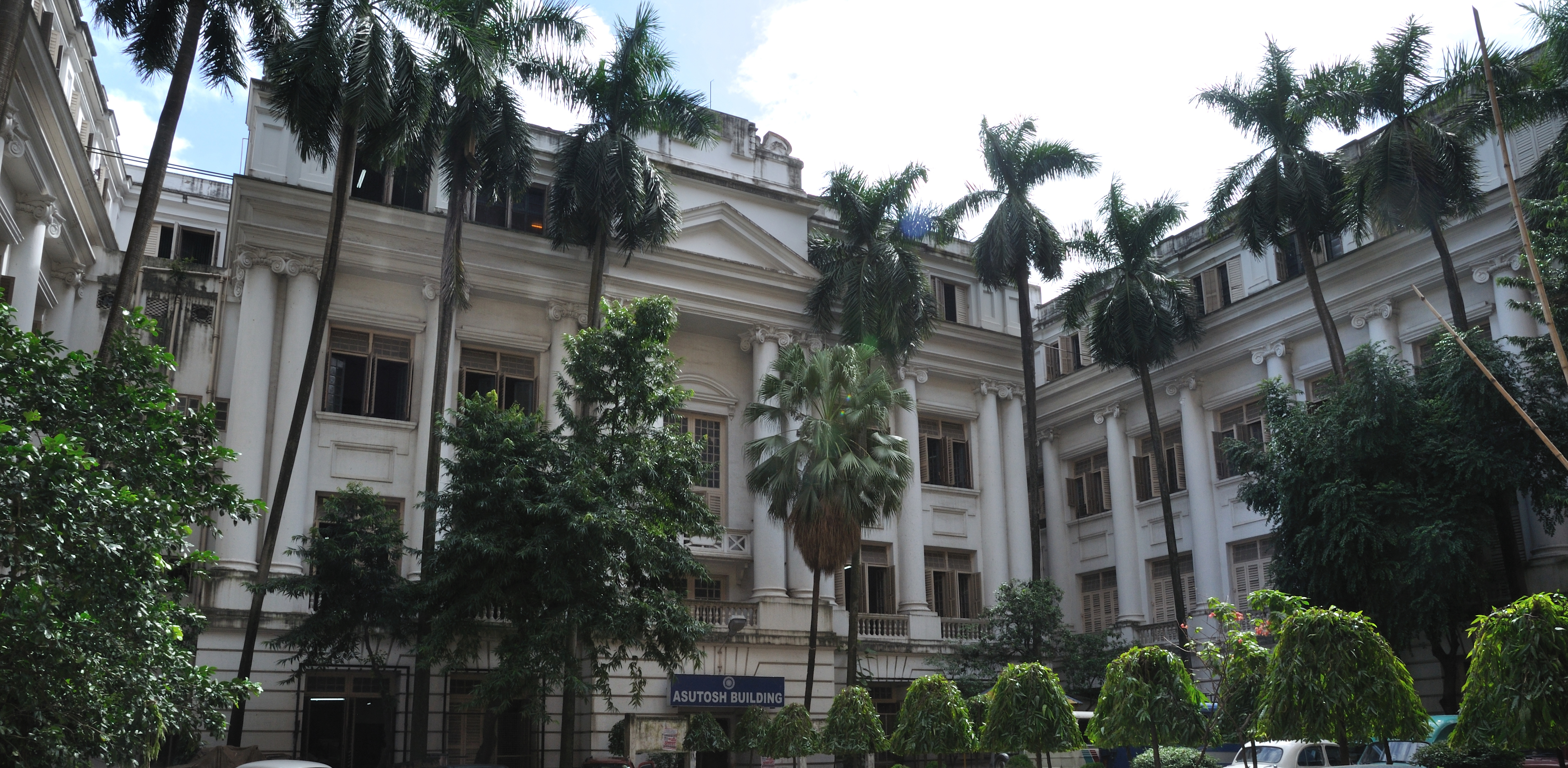
University of Calcutta, established in 1857, was the first multidisciplinary and secular Western-style institution in Asia.

Most of the public universities in India follow the collegiate system. The University of Mumbai, is a collegiate public state university located in the city of Mumbai, Maharashtra, India. The University of Mumbai is one of the largest universities in the world. As of 2013, the university had 711 affiliated colleges. As of 22 November 2021, the UGC lists 441 state universities. The oldest establishment date listed by the UGC is 1857, shared by the University of Calcutta, the University of Madras and the University of Mumbai. Most State Universities are collegiate universities administering many affiliated colleges (often located in small towns) that typically offer a range of undergraduate courses, but may also offer post-graduate courses. More established colleges may even offer PhD programs in some departments with the approval of the affiliating university.

=== Ireland ===
The only 'ancient university' in Ireland, North or Republic, is the University of Dublin. Created during the reign of Queen Elizabeth I, it is modelled on the collegiate universities of Cambridge and Oxford. However, only one constituent college was ever founded, hence the curious position of Trinity College Dublin (TCD), today. All of the teaching is provided by the college, with degrees being awarded by the university. Within the Republic of Ireland, the four constituent universities of the federal National University of Ireland (NUI) are, for all essential purposes, independent universities. The other truly collegiate university in Ireland is Ulster University, which is located in Northern Ireland (see United Kingdom on this list).

=== Italy ===
In Italy, independent halls of residence known as 'colleges of merit' operate in a number of university cities, offering tutoring, supplementary teaching, and additional diplomas. The university in which the collegiate model is most developed is the University of Pavia with four independent colleges (including two established in the 16th century: Collegio Borromeo, founded in 1561, and Collegio Ghislieri, founded in 1567) and 12 public colleges. However, neither in Pavia nor in any other Italian university do students have to be members of colleges.

=== Macau ===
The University of Macau has moved to a residential college system since 2010, when two pilot colleges were established. Further colleges have been founded since, and the university became collegiate in 2014, with 10 colleges in operation.

=== New Zealand ===
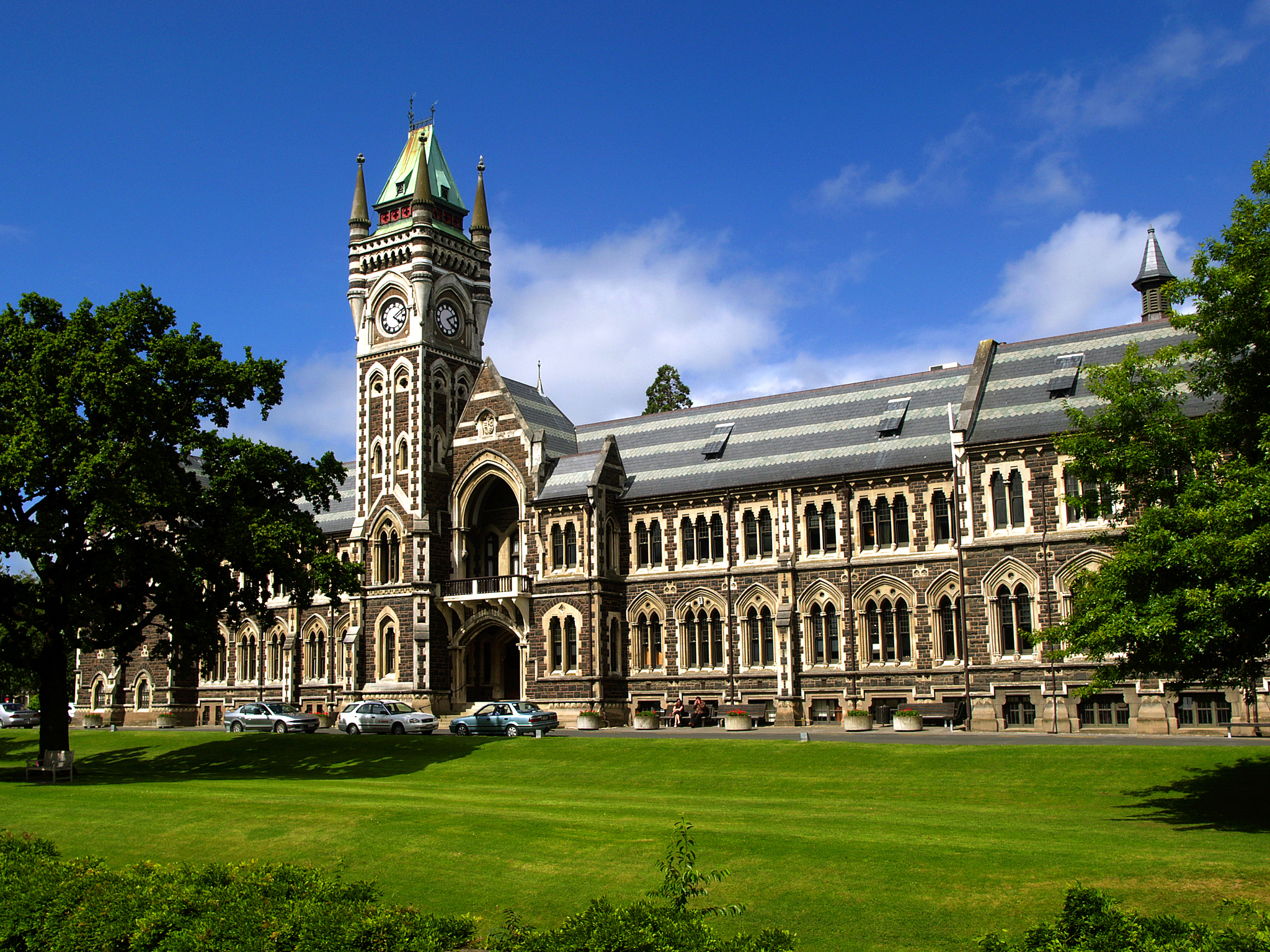
The University of Otago Registry Building

In New Zealand the University of Otago has 15 residential colleges, of which one (Abbey College) is postgraduate-only, nine are undergraduate-only and five take both postgraduate and undergraduate students. Most of the colleges are owned and managed by the university, but there are five independent "affiliated colleges" (City College, Knox College, St Margaret's College, Salmond College and Selwyn College). Membership of a college is not obligatory for students, and only students in residence count as college members. The colleges manage admission to the college (but not the university) and provide academic tutorials to students.

=== Singapore ===
The University of the Arts Singapore (UAS) is a publicly-funded private collegiate university in Singapore. It is a federation of two local arts colleges —Nanyang Academy of Fine Arts, and LASALLE College of the Arts. It was announced as a planned-university in 2021, and took its present name in 2022.

UAS will be the seventh local university of Singapore, and also will be the only publicly-funded private university other than the defunct and restructured UniSIM in Singapore. UAS will have its own degree-conferring power in Singapore.

=== United Kingdom ===
There are a number of British universities with colleges of different types. Some are listed bodies under the Education Reform Act 1988 legally recognised as "Institutions of a University", while others are not; (Note: The University of London's School of Advanced Studies, University Marine Biological Station, and University of London Institute Paris, Durham University's Wesley Study Centre, and the University of Manchester's Manchester Business School are also listed bodies as "Institutions of a University" but are not considered colleges by their parent universities) colleges of the University of London are recognised bodies under the 1988 act that have the right to award degrees of the University of London and (in many cases) their own degrees. Some colleges are legally independent of their parent university, while others are not.

Collegiate universities with centralised teaching and undergraduate teaching in colleges:

- University of Oxford (mostly independent colleges; listed bodies)
- University of Cambridge (independent colleges; listed bodies)

Collegiate universities with centralised teaching and residential-only colleges:

- Durham University (mostly dependent colleges; listed bodies) (with the exception of in-college teaching for ordinands at Cranmer Hall theological college within St John's)
- University of York (dependent colleges; not listed bodies)
- Lancaster University (dependent colleges; not listed bodies)
- University of Roehampton (dependent colleges; not listed bodies)

Collegiate universities where all teaching is carried out in the colleges:

- University of London (independent colleges; recognised bodies) (with the exception of teaching in the central bodies: the University of London Institute in Paris and the School of Advanced Study)
- University of the Arts London (dependent colleges; not listed bodies)
- University of the Highlands and Islands (independent colleges; listed bodies)

Unitary universities with centralised teaching and associated colleges that carry out their own teaching:

- Queen's University Belfast (two independent colleges; listed bodies)
- University of South Wales (two dependent colleges including one further education college delivering some higher education courses; listed bodies)
- University of Wales Trinity Saint David (one dependent further education college delivering some higher education courses; listed body)

=== United States ===
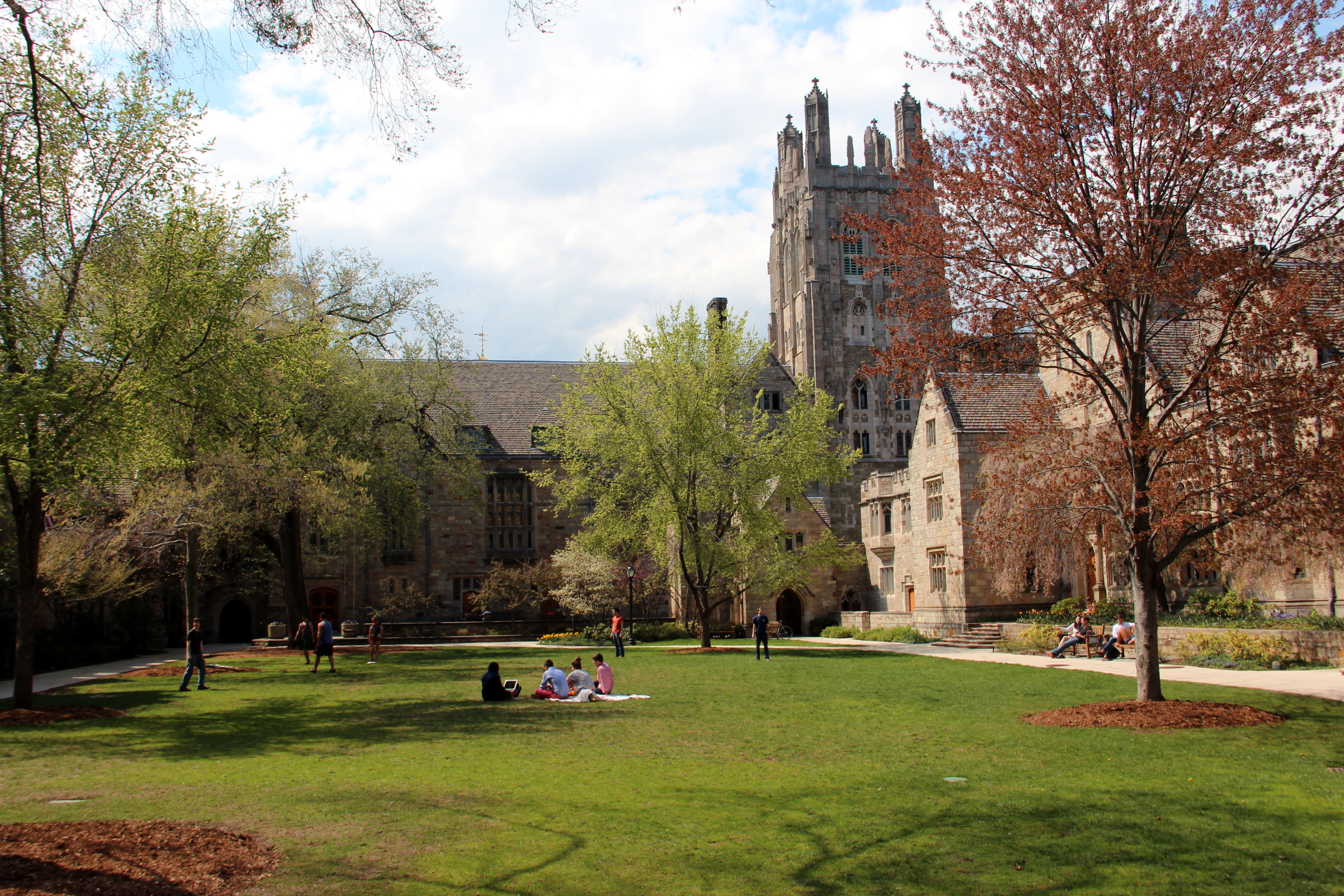
Branford College at Yale University

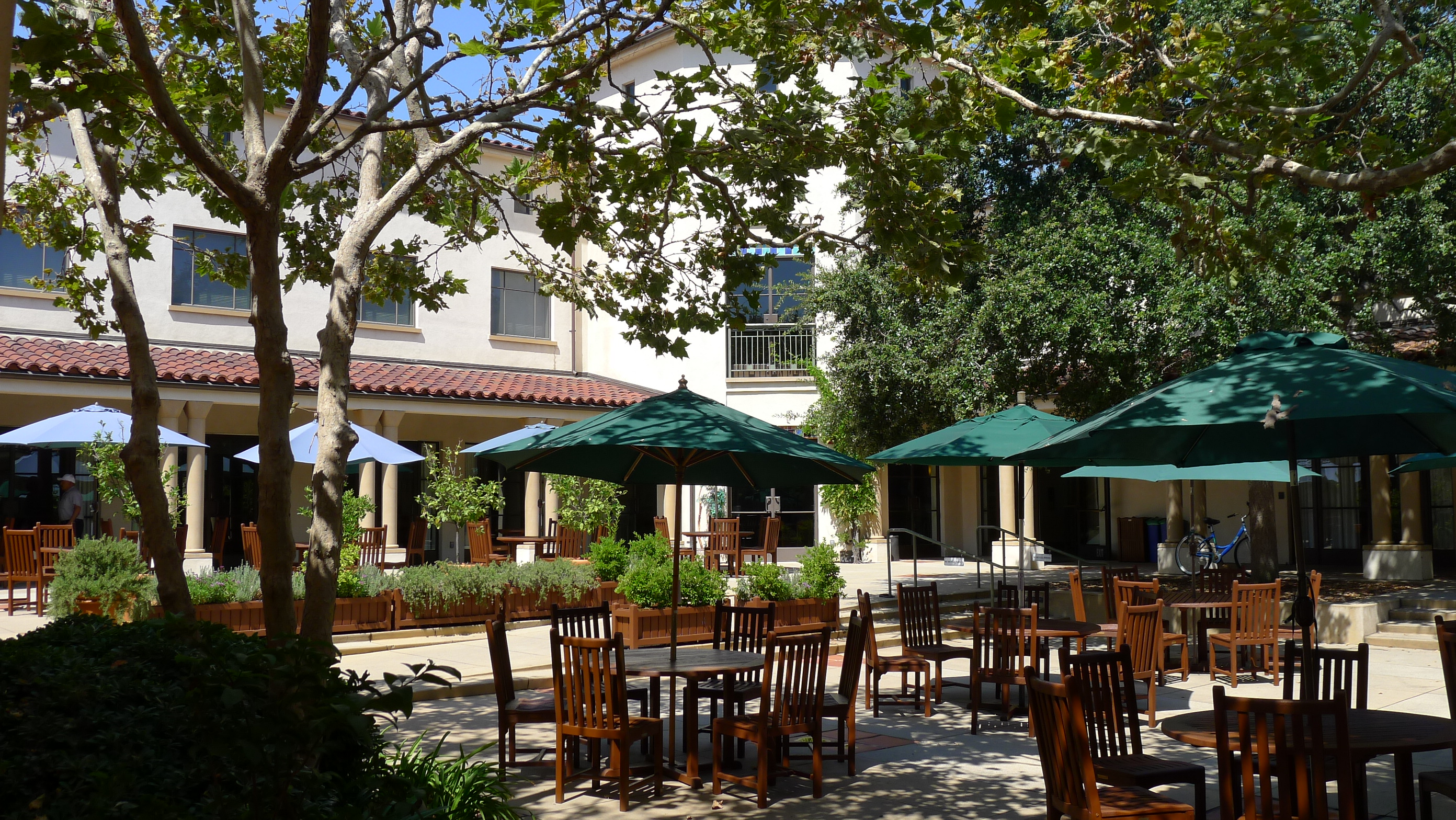
Avery House at the California Institute of Technology.

The US has a wide variety of systems. There are a number of universities with residential colleges, most of which are owned by the central university, which may be referred to as residential colleges or as houses. These do not normally participate in formal teaching, although there are exceptions to this. Most collegiate universities in the US were previously non-collegiate but have established residential colleges in the 20th or 21st century. There were around 30 universities with residential colleges in the US in 2010, examples include:

- Harvard University – Established in the 1930s, Harvard's house system has 12 residential houses for "upperclass" (second year and above) students, with a 13th non-residential house for students living off campus and postgraduate students. Students are assigned to colleges at the end of their first year.
- Yale University – Also established in the 1930s, Yale's residential college system has 14 colleges which follow the traditional British system of students joining a college when they join the university and remaining a member of that college.
- California Institute of Technology – Established in 1931, the house system at the California Institute of Technology has 8 houses for undergraduates, which students are selected into upon completion of a two-week "rotation" process when they first join the university. Students remain members of this house for the duration of their undergraduate education at Caltech, but may seek additional membership in other houses upon a public vote in the target house.
- Rice University – Established in 1957 with four colleges, Rice's residential college system now has 11 colleges. Students join a college when they enter the university and retain their membership throughout their time as an undergraduate, with around 75% living in college.
- University of California, Santa Cruz – Beginning in 1965 with the founding of Cowell College, the UC Santa Cruz residential college system has the most established collegiate system on the West Coast. All undergraduate students, whether they live on campus or not, are affiliated with one of 10 residential colleges.
- University of Notre Dame – Established in the 1960s, the Notre Dame residential college system features 32 halls in which all students are placed freshman year and remain for a minimum of 6 semesters. Students rarely switch halls, each of has its own spirit, coat of arms and colors, traditions, mascot, sport teams, events, dances and reputation.
- Princeton University – Established in the 1980s, Princeton's residential college system has six colleges, three of which house students from all years and the other three only first and second year students. Most students in the third year and above do not live in college accommodation, but retain their links to a college.
- Dartmouth College – Established in 2016, Dartmouth's house system has six houses that undergraduates are members of throughout their time at the university.

Many state university systems consist of campuses that are legally part of a single corporation (e.g., the Regents of the University of California is the corporation that owns and operates the entire University of California system), but are operationally independent. Examples of such institutions include the University of California, the State University of New York, the University of Michigan, the University of Texas System. Like UC Santa Cruz, UC San Diego also has a residential college system inspired by the British model. At both campuses, the academic resources are provided primarily by the university, but each residential college follows its own educational philosophy and sets out its own degree requirements.

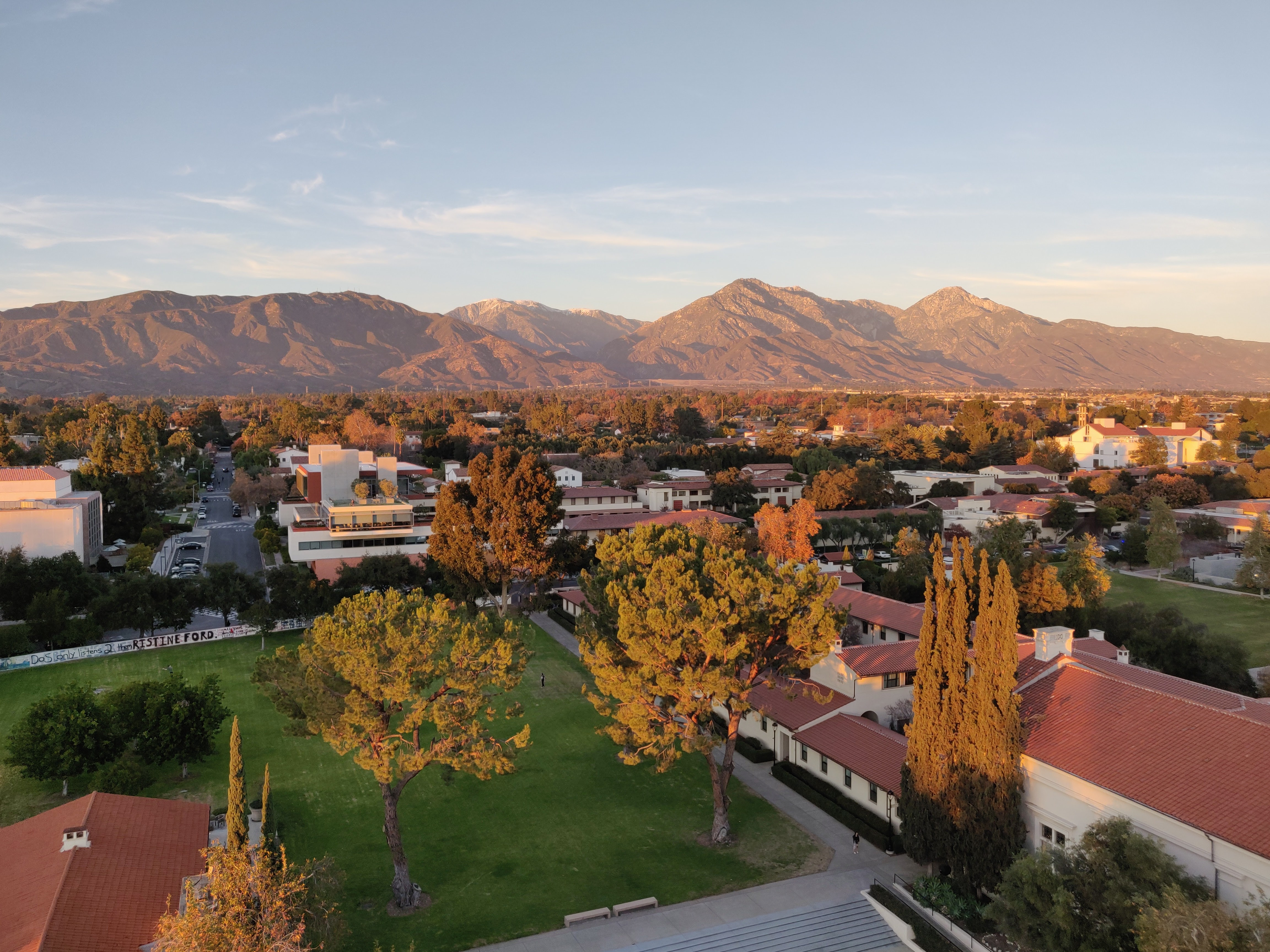
The Claremont Colleges

The Claremont Colleges in California operate a hybrid federal-constituent system. All 7 colleges are independently governed: Pomona College, Scripps College, Claremont McKenna College, Harvey Mudd College, Pitzer College as undergraduate colleges as well as Claremont Graduate University and Keck Graduate Institute of Applied Life Sciences as graduate universities. Their founding model was based on that of the University of Oxford and they are linked through the Claremont University Consortium, though, unlike other constituent college systems, degrees are conferred separately by the seven constituent institutions and they exist as universities and liberal arts colleges in their own right. The colleges are spread over a square mile site and share certain departmental, library and research facilities. In addition, the five undergraduate colleges operate two intercollegiate athletic programs, with Claremont, Harvey Mudd, and Scripps forming one program and Pomona and Pitzer the other.

== Former collegiate universities ==
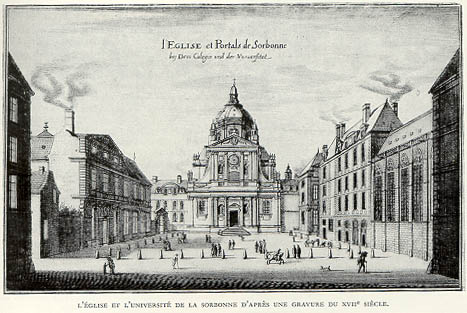
The University of Paris depicted in a 17th-century engraving

Some universities that once featured collegiate systems have lost them to mergers or suppression, due to financial, political or other reasons, or (in the case of federal universities) the individual colleges becoming independent universities. Examples include the following:

=== Former residential college systems ===
- At the University of St Andrews, the surviving colleges play a purely ceremonial role and are neither teaching nor residential bodies. The three colleges are St Mary's College for the Faculty of Divinity and United College for the other faculties, and St Leonard's College for postgraduates. University College, Dundee was incorporated into St Andrews in 1898 and was merged with the medical school, the dental school and the Dundee School of Economics in 1954 to form Queen's College. This became the independent University of Dundee in 1967.
- At the University of Coimbra, independent colleges much like the Oxbridge ones were created throughout the 16th, 17th and 18th centuries. They were abolished with the extinction of religious orders in 1836.
- The colleges of the former University of Paris were suppressed after the French Revolution.
- The University of Salamanca had a large number of colleges (four colegios mayores, or large colleges, and many colegios menores, or small colleges), which were abolished in 1807 when Napoleon invaded Spain.
- Leipzig University as an example of a medieval German university (currently the second oldest in the country) was structured into colleges in a similar way. Often they were set up by a particular monastic order to serve its members. Colleges served as places of living and collegiate teaching. They had jurisdiction over their members (i.e. municipal courts of the city of Leipzig would refuse to hear actions brought against them). In addition there were private residential halls (Bursen). Parallel to the college system there were four nations (university nations) similar to the model of the universities of Prague (Leipzig's 'mother' institution, see Decree of Kutná Hora) and Paris after which they were modelled. During the age of enlightenment this structure was abandoned. Still today, the names of the former colleges live on as names of buildings used by the university.
- The University of Kent abolished the position of college master in 2020. A revision of the university's ordinances in June 2025 deleted the section on colleges that had been present up to the 2024 revision, removing then from the university's constitutional documents. As of 2025, only three of the university's residences still bear the names of colleges.

=== Former federal universities ===
- The Victoria University, which split into the Victoria University of Manchester, the University of Liverpool and the University of Leeds.
- The University of Wales was a federal university from its formation in 1893 until 2007, when its colleges became independent and it was transformed into a non-membership accreditation body.
- The University of Durham was a federal university with two divisions in Durham and Newcastle between 1909 and 1963, when the Newcastle division became Newcastle University.
- The Federal University of Surrey was, from 2000 to 2004, a federation of the University of Surrey and the University of Surrey Roehampton (now Roehampton University). It was dissolved when Roehampton became an independent university.
- The University of France was established by Napoleon in 1808 and acted as a central university for the académies (the former universities) until 1896, when these were restored to full university status.
- The University of South Africa was formerly a federal university with constituent colleges in the various provinces of South Africa. After the Second World War, most of these colleges became autonomous universities, and the University of South Africa became primarily a distance education institution.

== See also ==
- Affiliated school
- List of residential colleges
