= Lee Woo Sing College =

Coordinates: 22.4224°N 114.2043°E

- 和聲書院
- Motto: 知仁忠和
- Motto in English: Wisdom, Humanity, Integrity, Harmony
- Type: Public
- Established: 2007
- Affiliations: The Chinese University of Hong Kong
- Master: Joseph Lau Wan Yee
- Location: Hong Kong
- Website: ws.cuhk.edu.hk

Lee Woo Sing College
- Traditional Chinese: 和聲書院
Transcriptions
Yue: Cantonese
- Yale Romanization: Wòh sīng syū yuhn
- Jyutping: Wo4 sing1 syu1 jyun6

Lee Woo Sing College is one of the constituent colleges of the Chinese University of Hong Kong, a public university in New Territories, Hong Kong. The college was founded by CUHK's university council in 2007 and admitted its first class of students in 2011. The naming of the college is made possible by a HK$150 million donation and is named after entrepreneur Lee Woo Sing.

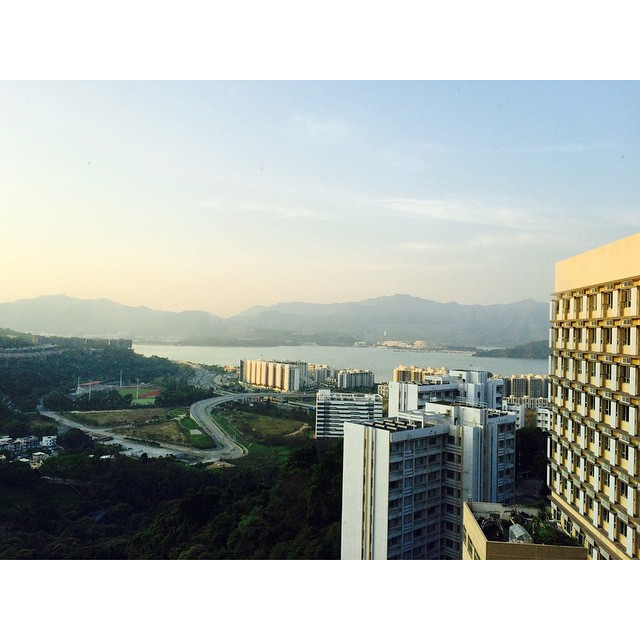
View from Dorothy and Ti-Hua KOO Building (Sunrise)

== Site ==
It is located to the northwest of the existing United College.

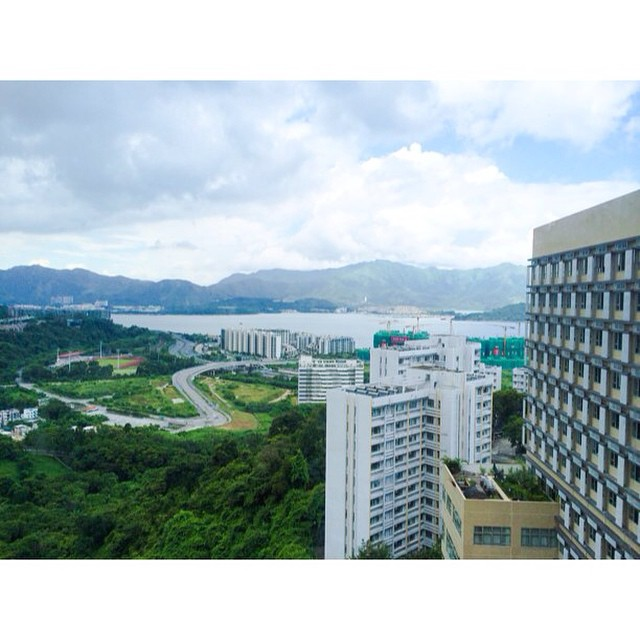
View from Dorothy and Ti-Hua KOO Building (South Block)

== Facilities ==
There are two buildings, North Block and Dorothy and Ti-Hua KOO Building (South Block). Facilities include a well equipped gym/fitness room, table tennis room, BBQ area, piano room, band room, cookery demonstration room, seminar rooms and multi-purpose theatres. The Catering Centre includes a food hall (WS Pavilion), a Shanghainese Restaurant (The Harmony) and a coffee shop (Café Tolo).

== System ==
The arrangement will be similar to that of the four existing colleges in The Chinese University of Hong Kong, i.e. students can be either residents or non-residents. It is estimated that it will accommodate 600 of each.
