= Morningside College =

Morningside College may refer to:

- Morningside College, a constituent college of the Chinese University of Hong Kong, in New Territories, Hong Kong
- Morningside University (formerly known as Morningside College), a private United Methodist Church university in Sioux City, Iowa, United States
