= Shaw College, Chinese University of Hong Kong =

College of the Chinese University of Hong Kong

Coordinates: 22.4228°N 114.2012°E

Shaw College
- 逸夫書院
- Motto: 修德講學
- Motto in English: Cultivate virtue, go more deeply into what I have learned
- Type: Public
- Established: 1986
- Affiliations: Chinese University of Hong Kong
- Head: Professor LEUNG Yiu-kin Freedom
- Location: Hong Kong
- Website: shaw.cuhk.edu.hk

Chinese name
- Traditional Chinese: 逸夫書院
- Simplified Chinese: 逸夫书院
Transcriptions
Standard Mandarin
- Hanyu Pinyin: Yìfū Shūyuàn
Yue: Cantonese
- Jyutping: jat6 fu1 syu1 jyun2

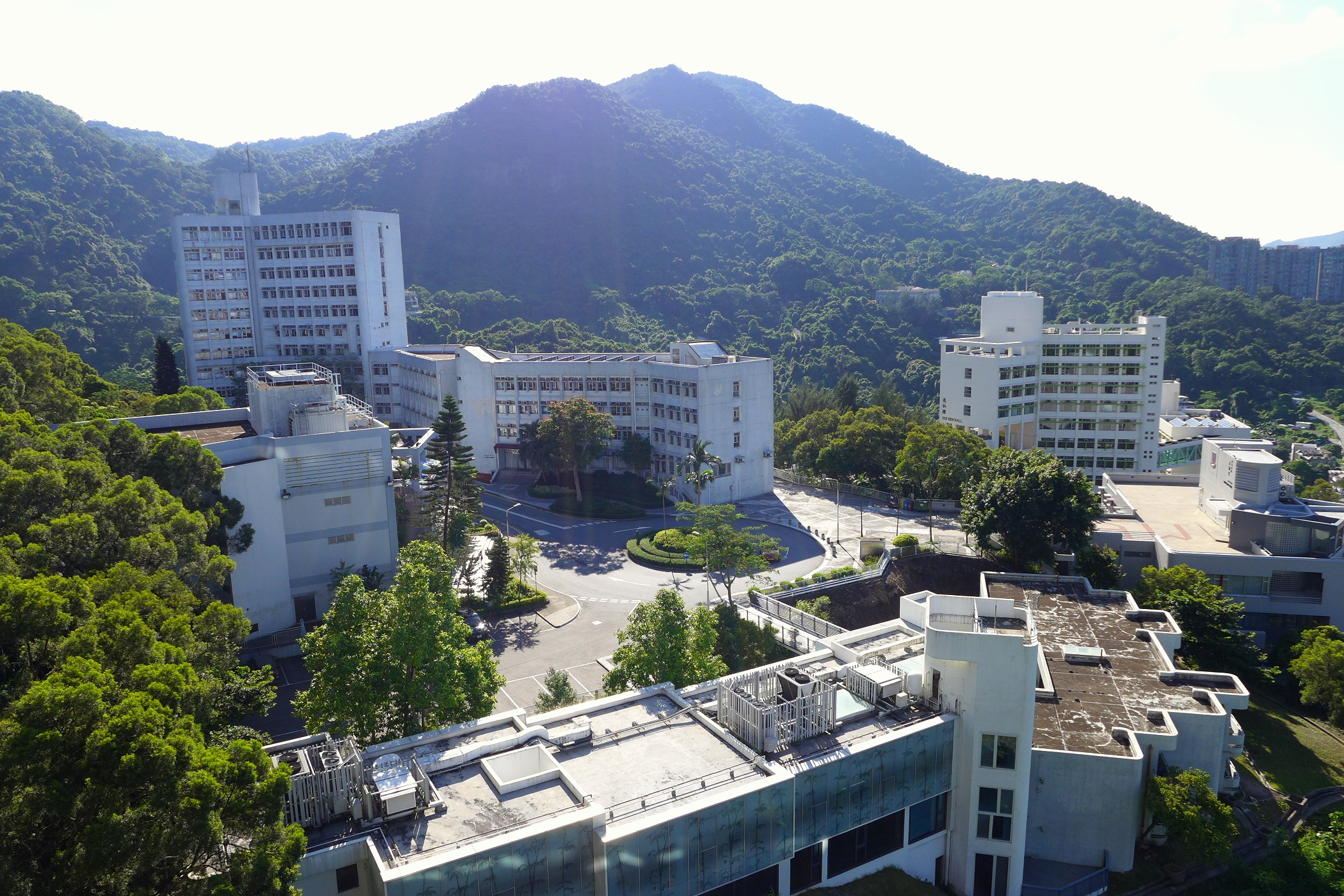
Shaw College

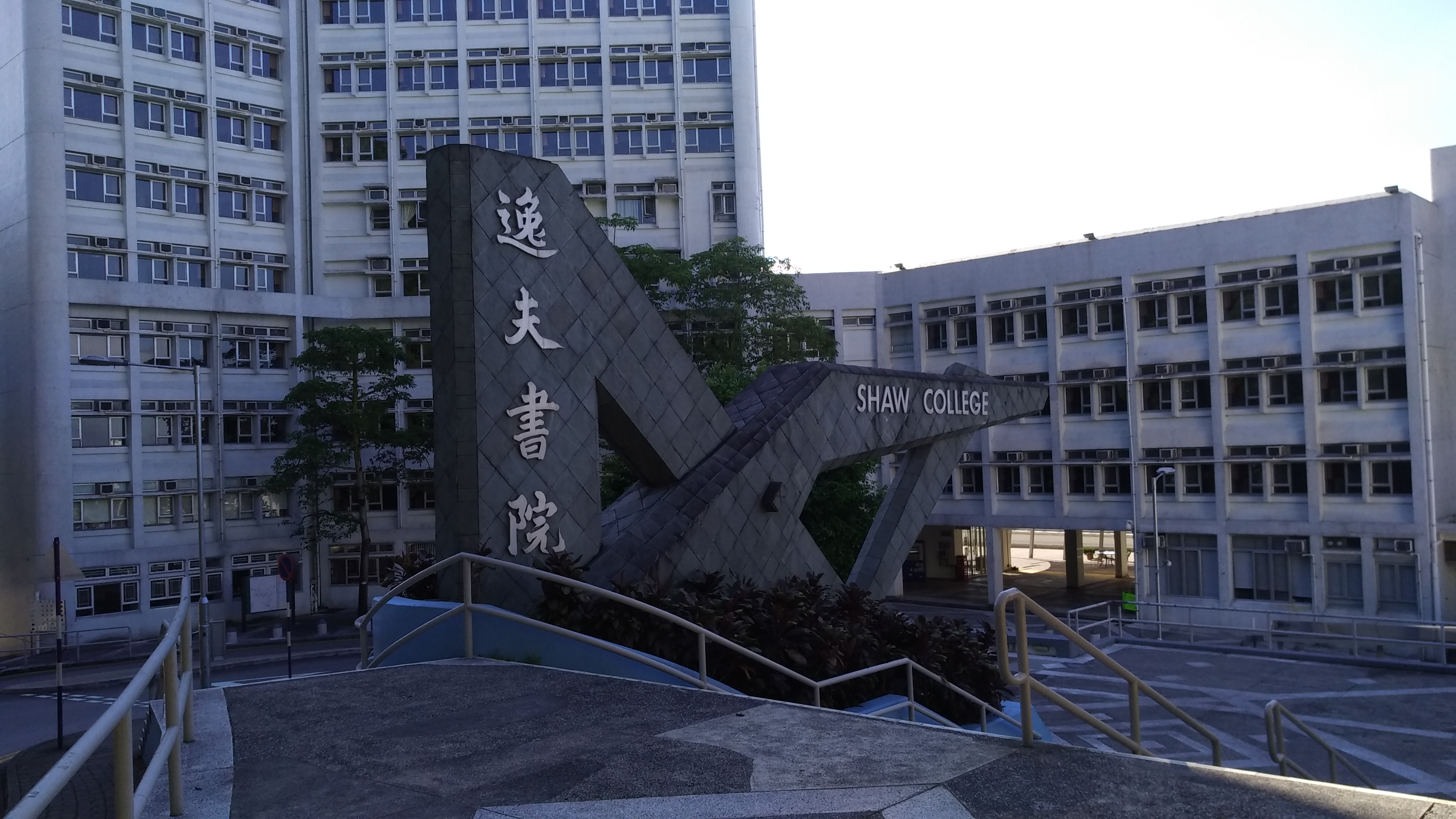
Landmark in the college

Shaw College (Chinese: 逸夫書院) is the fourth constituent college to be established at the Chinese University of Hong Kong, a public university in New Territories, Hong Kong.

== History ==
The college is named after its patron, Sir Run Run Shaw, who donated five hundred million Hong Kong dollars toward its establishment in May 1985. In the same year, the university established a task force to prepare for its establishment. The foundation of the college was enabled by the Chinese University of Hong Kong (Declaration of Shaw College) Ordinance passed by the Legislative Council in July 1986.

The foundation stone was laid on 12 January 1987 in a ceremony officiated by Run Run Shaw and Acting Governor David Akers-Jones. This is considered the school anniversary, and is celebrated each year through student events. The college was officially opened in March 1990 by Run Run Shaw and Governor David Wilson, Baron Wilson of Tillyorn.

== Facilities and activities ==
The college has two student residences: Kuo Mou Hall and Student Hostel II. Kou Mou Hall, called Student Hostel I until it was renamed in 1998, was opened in September 1990 and comprises a ten storey high block and a three-storey low block. It provides 576 dorm spaces for both males and females. Student Hostel II opened in 1992 and was subsequently expanded. It now provides 635 living places in two blocks. The high block was named Yat Sen Hall in 2010. The third student hostel, named Mona Shaw Hall, was designed to provide 300 hostel places and exoected to be completed by late 2026.

The college also hosts a guesthouse and one administration building including computer labs, conference rooms and a self-learning centre. Other amenities include a student canteen and an indoor sport facility (including a fitness room, squash courts and an indoor basketball facility). The school is also equipped with a standard outdoor basketball court as well as a barbecue area.

The college provides a wide variety of extra-curricular activities for every student to explore. In addition, tremendous financial aids are offered each year to students with outstanding performances in either academic, social voluntary activities, or sports events. The motto, 修德講學 (Jyutping: sau1 dak1 gong2 hok6), is derived from a work of Confucius.

== College Head ==
- Prof. CHEN Char-nie (1997–1994)
- Prof. YEUNG Yue-man (1994–2004)
- Prof. CHING Pak-chung (2004–2008)
- Prof. Joseph SUNG Jao-yiu (2008–2010)
- Prof. Andrew CHAN Chi-Fai (2010–2020)
- Prof. Freedom LEUNG Yiu-Kin (2020–Present)

== Alumni ==
- Gary Chan, member of the Legislative Council
- Florence Hui, undersecretary for Home Affairs
- Daniel Lee, triathlete
