= Wu Yee Sun College =

College of The Chinese University of Hong Kong

Coordinates: 22.4222°N 114.2025°E

- 伍宜孫書院
- Motto: 博學篤行
- Motto in English: Scholarship and Perseverance
- Established: 2007
- Affiliations: The Chinese University of Hong Kong
- Founding Master Current Master: Prof. Rance P.L. Lee Prof. Anthony T.C. Chan
- Location: Sha Tin, Hong Kong
- Website: wys.cuhk.edu.hk

Wu Yee Sun College
- Traditional Chinese: 伍宜孫書院
Transcriptions
Yue: Cantonese
- Yale Romanization: Ńgh yìh syūn syū yuhn
- Jyutping: Ng6 ji4 syun1 syu1 jyun6

Wu Yee Sun College (Chinese: 伍宜孫書院) is one of the constituent colleges of the Chinese University of Hong Kong, a public university in New Territories, Hong Kong. The college was established in 2007.

== History ==
The college was established in 2007 with support from the Wu Yee Sun Charitable Foundation. The first cohort of 300 students began study in 2012. The college can accommodate up to 1200 students at any given time.

A new 250-place hostel supported by the government's Hostel Development Fund is expected to be completed in 2027.

== Motto and mission ==
The college motto is 'Scholarship and Perseverance'. In the college's bounds, students will develop an interest in social entrepreneurship, creativity and innovation, and in pursuing new projects and ideas.

'Entrepreneurial Spirit with Social Responsibility' is a central focus. Through its diverse programmes of general education, college student life, and cultural and overseas exchanges, the college aims to broaden students' horizons (scholarship) and encourage them to forge ahead (perseverance) in making contributions to society and leading a productive and rewarding life.
