= S.H. Ho College =

- 善衡書院
- Motto: 文行忠信
- Motto in English: Culture, Morals, Devotion, Trustworthiness
- Established: 2006
- Affiliations: The Chinese University of Hong Kong
- Master: Samuel Sun Sai-ming
- Location: Hong Kong
- Website: shho.cuhk.edu.hk

S.H. Ho College
- Traditional Chinese: 善衡書院
Transcriptions
Yue: Cantonese
- Yale Romanization: Sihn hàhng syū yuhn
- Jyutping: Sin6 hang4 syu1 jyun6

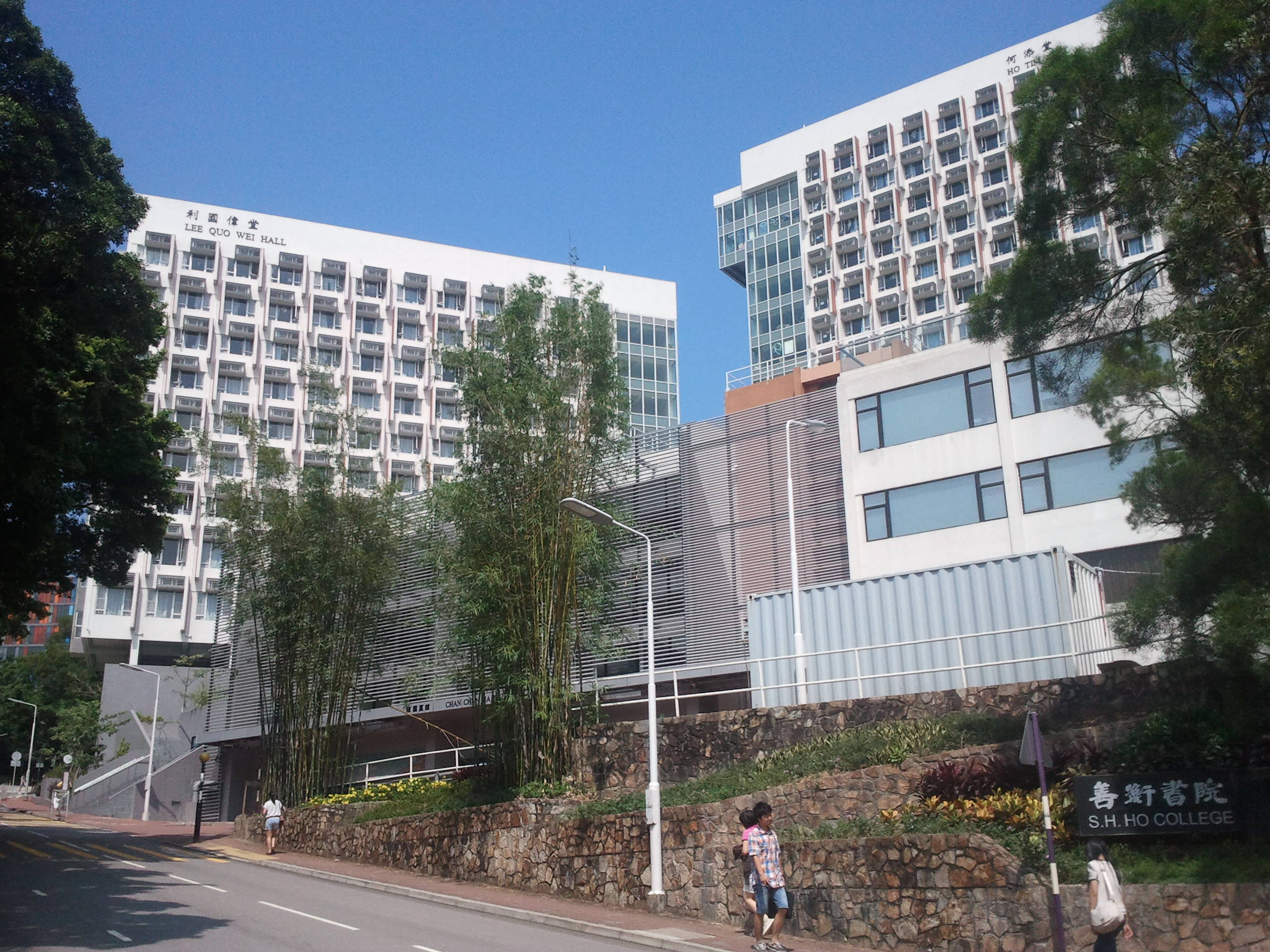
S.H. Ho College

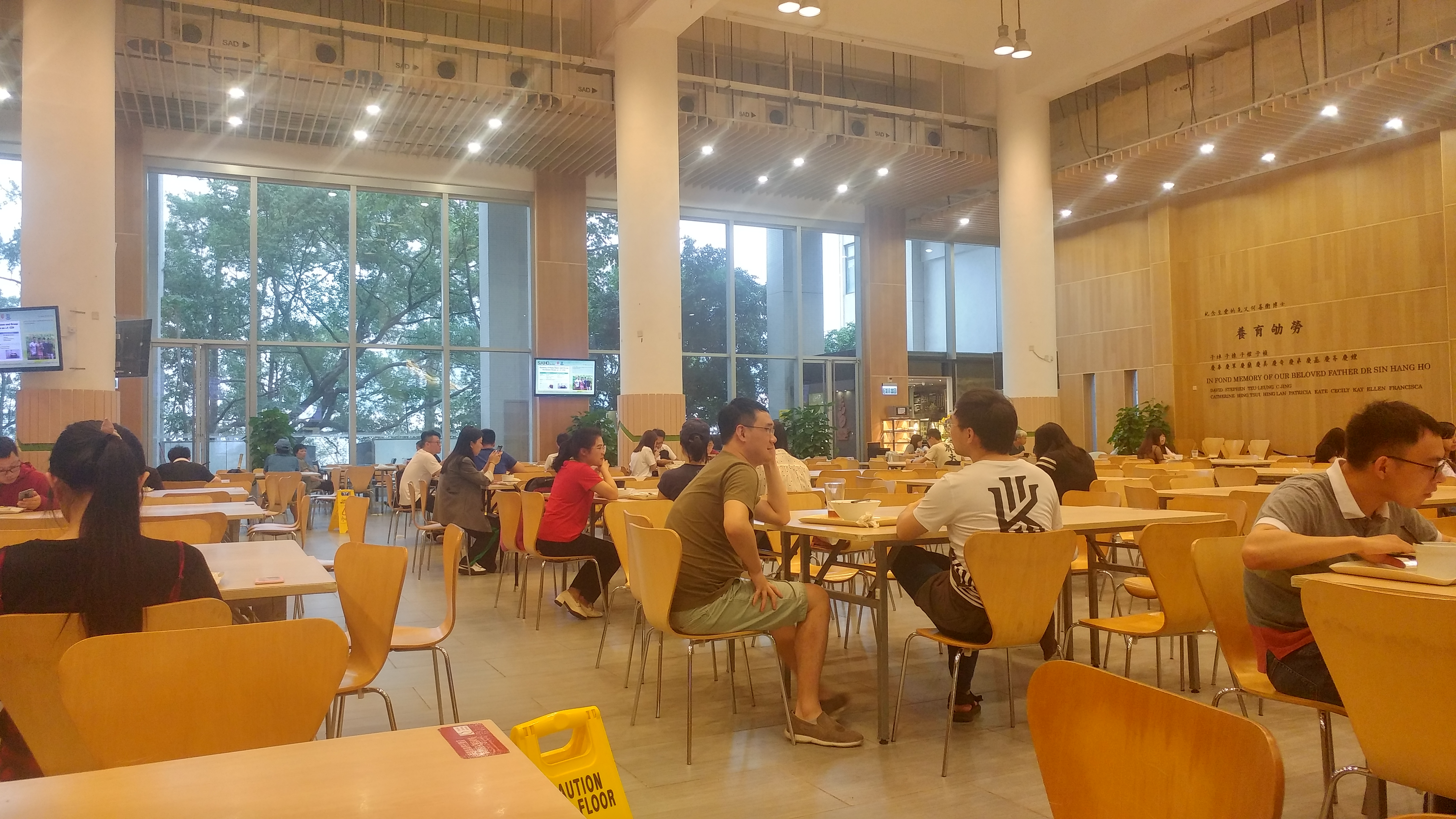
The College Dining Hall

The S.H. Ho College is one of the constituent colleges of the Chinese University of Hong Kong, a public university in New Territories, Hong Kong. The college started to admit its first class of students in 2010. It is named after Ho Sin Hang, a Hong Kong businessman who founded Hang Seng Bank.

In August 2006, Professor Samuel Sun, a professor of biology in CUHK, was appointed Founding Master of S.H. Ho College.

== Motto ==
The motto of the college is "Culture, Morals, Devotion, Trustworthiness".

== Site ==
It is located in between the central campus and the existing Chung Chi College, and is next to another new college, Morningside College.

== System ==
The S.H. Ho College, along with the Morningside College and the CW Chu College, are the first colleges in The Chinese University of Hong Kong operating on a fully residential and communal dining basis. All undergraduates belonging to S.H. Ho College are required to take up residency in the hostels of the college, and attend communal dinners three times a week.

With a resident population of 600 students, S.H. Ho College is the largest of the three colleges adopting this system.
