= CMB Wing Lung Bank =

Bank based in Hong Kong

CMB Wing Lung Bank 招商永隆銀行

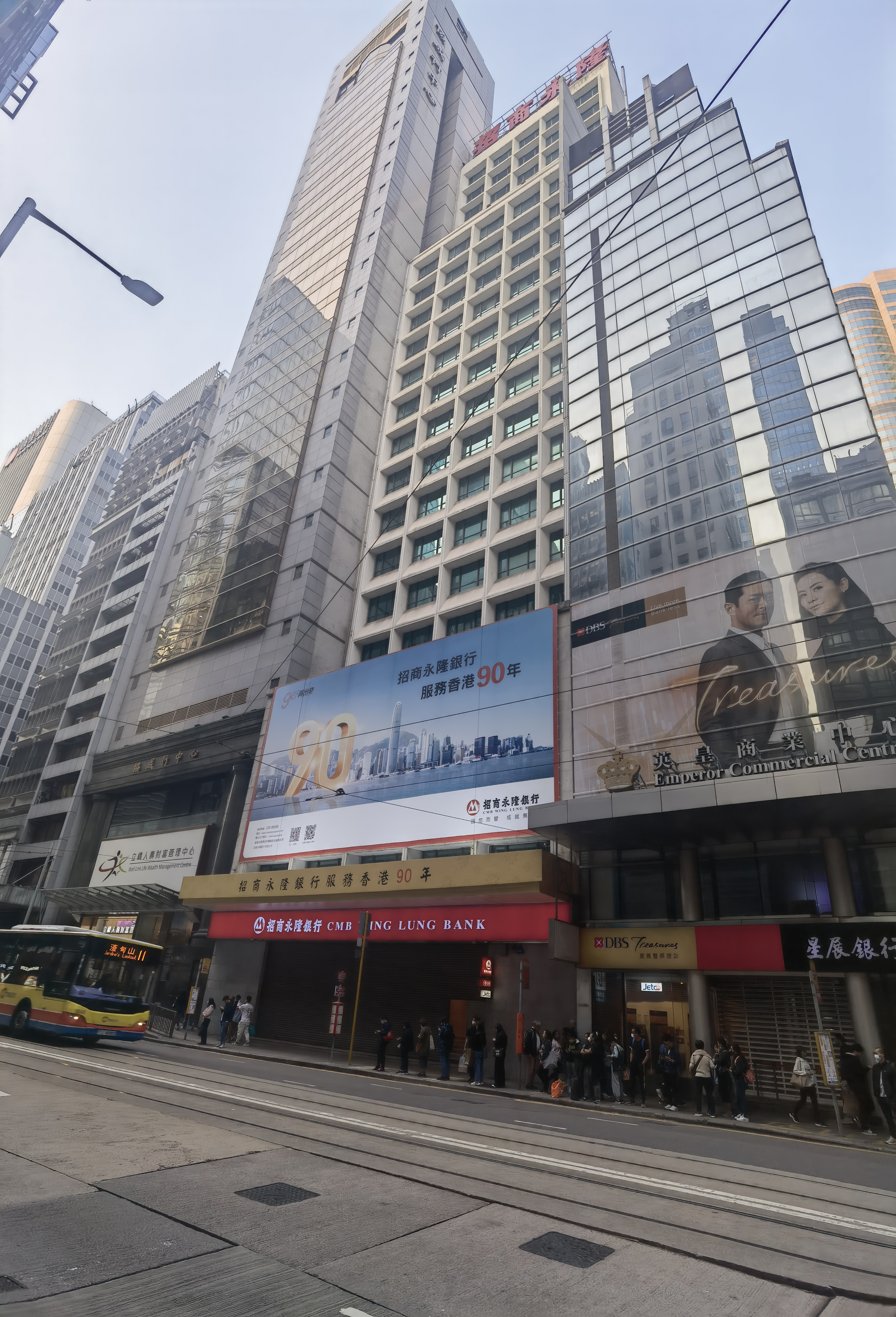
- Headquarters in Central
- Industry: Banking
- Founded: 25 February 1933; 93 years ago
- Founder: WU Yee-Sun
- Headquarters: 45 Des Voeux Road Central, Central, Hong Kong
- Key people: Wang Liang (Chairman); Liu Jun (Chief Executive Officer)
- Services: Financial services
- Operating income: ▲HKD6.5 billion (2018)
- Net income: ▼HKD3.2 billion (2018)
- Total assets: ▲HKD314 billion (2018)
- Number of employees: ▲1,935 (2018)
- Parent: China Merchants Bank Co., Ltd.
- Website: cmbwinglungbank.com

CMB Wing Lung Bank (Chinese: 招商永隆銀行; former stock no: SEHK: 96) is a bank based in Hong Kong. As of December 2018, the bank has 35 branches in Hong Kong, 4 branches in mainland China, 1 branch in Macau and 2 overseas branches, located respectively in Los Angeles and San Francisco in the United States.

The bank was founded on 25 February 1933 by Dr. Wu Yee-sun, who owned a majority stake in the bank. It was listed in Hong Kong from 1980 to 2009 until it was acquired by China Merchants Bank. It currently employs over 1,900 people and has assets over HKD 300 billion.

In 2008, China Merchants Bank purchased 53.12 percent of Wing Lung Bank's equity and became the largest shareholder of the bank. Dr. Ma Weihua (China Merchants Bank's president) and Dr. Zhang Guanghua (China Merchants Bank's vice president) were appointed as the chairman and Vice Chairman of Wing Lung Bank respectively.

In 2009, China Merchants Bank acquired the remaining shares of Wing Lung Bank, and it became a wholly owned subsidiary of China Merchants Bank. It was delisted from the Hong Kong Stock Exchange after 16 January 2009. In May 2009, Wing Lung Bank adopted the corporate identity of China Merchants Bank.

The Los Angeles branch, located in Alhambra, California, features the largest glass Tile mural in North America, measuring 34.5 feet (10.5 m) tall by 129.5 feet (39.5 m) wide. The mural comprises approximately 1 million pieces of glass tile set in an abstract interpretation designed to reflect the nearby San Gabriel Mountains. The mural received the 2007 Spectrum Award, the top industry award for excellence in tile design and implementation.

On the list of Top 500 Banking Brands of The Banker, CMB has jumped into the Top 10, ranking 9th in 2019.
