= Wu Yee-sun =

Hong Kong entrepreneur

- Born: Wu, Yee-sun; 1904; Xingtan, Guangdong province, Qing Empire
- Died: 11 May 2005 (aged 100–101); Hong Kong, China
- Occupation: Founder of Wing Lung Bank (formerly Wing Lung Money Exchange)
- Parent: Wu York-Yu (father)

Wu Yee-sun (Chinese: 伍宜孫; 1904 – 11 May 2005) was a Hong Kong entrepreneur and billionaire who founded the Wing Lung Bank.

== Life and career ==
Although he was born into a well-known family, times were difficult and he had to leave school at 14. The family suffered through a number of disasters and, as the oldest son, Wu left Guangdong to seek work in Hong Kong to help support his family in the 1920s. In 1933, he and some friends established "Wing Lung Money Exchange" (later Wing Lung Bank) in Central, Hong Kong. In later years contributions towards setting up or improving hospitals, clinics, universities and schools in Mainland China and Hong Kong were made in the name of Wu or his father. On 11 May 2005, Dr. Wu died in Hong Kong Sanatorium and Hospital at the age of 101.

A minor planet was discovered at the Purple Mountain Observatory at Nanking, China in 1979. Provisionally designated as 1979 XO, in 1998 this 3,570th known asteroid was named 3570 Wuyeesun after Wu.

== Penjing ==
Wu's father, Wu York-Yu (Chinese: 伍若瑜), and grandfather, Wu Yee-Hong (Chinese: 伍宜康), were both practitioners of the "grow and clip" method of training trees into artistic forms (penjing), which came to be known as the "Lingnan School".

In 1967 Wu and his friends established the Man Lung ("scholar-farmer") Garden as a place to meet, discuss, study, and exhibit. Two years later, he published and distributed Man Lung Garden Artistic Pot Plants, the definitive book on Chinese penjing of the Lingnan style, "fearing that the Chinese art of training pot plants might [otherwise] someday be lost." In 1974 an enlarged edition of the book came out as Man Lung Artistic Pot Plants with the addition of the history and evolution of artistic pot plants, notes from presentations, and over 100 additional photographs. Some 10,000 copies were donated to leading libraries, universities, and bonsai lovers all over the world to commemorate Wu's retirement from the chairmanship of Wing Lung Bank.

Over the years, Wu's personal collection grew to nearly 400 specimens of penjing. Many of these he donated to public institutions in Europe and North America, including the Seventh University of Paris (France, five trees in c.1982), Montreal Botanical Garden (Canada, thirty trees in 1985, over twenty more in 1987), and the Dr. Sun Yat-Sen Classical Chinese Garden in Vancouver (Canada). Other trees have gone to the Botanical Park of the Nanjing Institute of the Chinese Academy of Sciences, the Hong Kong Baptist College (2000) and the Former Government House, Hong Kong. All of these penjing exhibitions are open to the public.

(In the 1970s Wu had offered the U.S. fifty of his penjing on the condition that the usual importation procedure of bare-rooting and fumigation be forgone, as this would have been fatal to these very old trees. However, the U.S. Department of Agriculture refused to make an exception to its rule, although the Bicentennial trees from Japan had been excepted earlier. The Japanese trees harbored twenty-three identifiable pests. After a few years of negotiation, the Department of Agriculture and Agri-Food Canada did issue a special phytosanitary certificate for Wu's trees, although two of his Japanese black pines could not be imported. The U.S. received 24 of Wu's trees in 1986 to begin a two-year quarantine before being exhibited. The Wu Chinese Garden Pavilion at the National Bonsai and Penjing Museum on the grounds of the U.S. National Arboretum was opened in 1996.)

Wu occasionally hosted individuals and groups from around the world who travelled to see his garden on the beautifully raised terrace fronting his house, which itself was built on a steep mountainside overlooking Hong Kong public Man Lung Garden was opened at Hong Kong Baptist University in the year 2000. A website for the garden (http://www.manlungpenjing.org) was set up for discussion and exchange of information. Wu instructed his son Norman Po-Man (one of thirteen children) to take color photographs and publish a hardcover souvenir volume; this comprehensive collection of penjing in full color called Man Lung Penjing was published in 2002, covering over seventy years of study and is a record of Wu's creative style.

== See also ==
- Wu Yee Sun College
