= List of colleges of the Chinese University of Hong Kong =

As a collegiate university, the Chinese University of Hong Kong comprises nine colleges that differ in character and history, each retaining substantial autonomy on institutional affairs: Chung Chi College, New Asia College, United College, Shaw College, Morningside College, S. H. Ho College, CW Chu College, Wu Yee Sun College and Lee Woo Sing College. All undergraduate students are affiliated to one of them.

Colleges are designed as communities with their own hostels, dining halls and other facilities. Students receive pastoral care and whole-person education, including formal and non-formal general education by means of close interaction with teachers and peers, and in some colleges, assemblies and college final year project. Colleges promote extracurricular social and athletic activities with an aim of building camaraderie among students. This focus on 'student orientated teaching', education through both formal teaching and student empowerment, distinguishes CUHK from other universities in the territory.

When the structure of the university was revamped in 1976, and the autonomy of the colleges diminished, Lord Fulton clarified the role of the colleges: "the natural home of student-oriented teaching is the college [which] is an association of senior and junior members come together in pursuit of shared academic interests and aims." He wrote that the colleges help students achieve "a sense of his or her personal significance and responsibility, and on that basis to enrich the common life."

== Colleges ==
College	Chinese name	Established	Motto (in Chinese)	Motto (in English)	Master
Three founding colleges
Chung Chi College	崇基學院	1951	止於至善	In Pursuit of Excellence	Fong Wing-ping
New Asia College	新亞書院	1949	誠明	Sincerity and intelligence	Siumi Maria Tam
United College of Hong Kong	香港聯合書院	1956	明德新民	Make one's virtues shine and renew the people	Jimmy Yu Chai-mei
Fourth college
Shaw College	逸夫書院	1986	修德講學	Cultivate virtue, go more deeply into what I have learned	Andrew Chan Chi-fai
Five new colleges
Morningside College	晨興書院	2006	博學 進德 濟民	Scholarship, Virtue, Service	Nicholas Rawlins
S.H. Ho College	善衡書院	2006	文行忠信	Culture, Morals, Devotion, Trustworthiness	Samuel Sun Sai-ming
CW Chu College	敬文書院	2007	修己澤人，儲才濟世	Cultivating oneself and benefiting the community	Wong Suk-ying
Wu Yee Sun College	伍宜孫書院	2007	博學篤行	Scholarship and Perseverance	Rance P.L. Lee
Lee Woo Sing College	和聲書院	2007	知仁忠和	Wisdom, Humanity, Integrity, Harmony	Joseph Lau Wan-yee
