= Morningside College, Chinese University of Hong Kong =

Morningside College
- 晨興書院
- Motto: 博學 進德 濟民
- Motto in English: Scholarship, Virtue, Service
- Type: Public
- Established: 2006; 20 years ago
- Founders: James Mirrlees
- Parent institution: Chinese University of Hong Kong
- Master: Nicholas Rawlins
- Students: 300
- Location: Ma Liu Shui, Shatin, Hong Kong; 22.419°N 114.210°E
- Campus: Rural
- Colours: Purple and Yellow
- Website: morningside.cuhk.edu.hk

Morningside College is one of the nine constituent colleges of the Chinese University of Hong Kong, a public university in the New Territories, Hong Kong.

== Motto ==
The motto of the College is Scholarship, Virtue, Service.

== History ==
Morningside College was established in 2006 with donations from the Morningside Foundation and the Morningside Education Foundation. The Scottish economist and winner of the 1996 Nobel Memorial Prize in Economic Sciences, Professor Sir James Mirrlees, was appointed the founding Master that same year. The only founding fellow who still works in the college is Professor Colin A. Graham. The fully residential College accommodates 300 students with communal dining three nights per week during term time. The College admitted its first cohort in 2010.

== Facilities ==
Morningside College consists of two buildings: Maurice R. Greenberg Building and the Tower Block. The building complex is equipped with gyms, laundry rooms, activity rooms and TV rooms. The two buildings are connected by a bridge. The dining hall is located at the basement level of the complex.

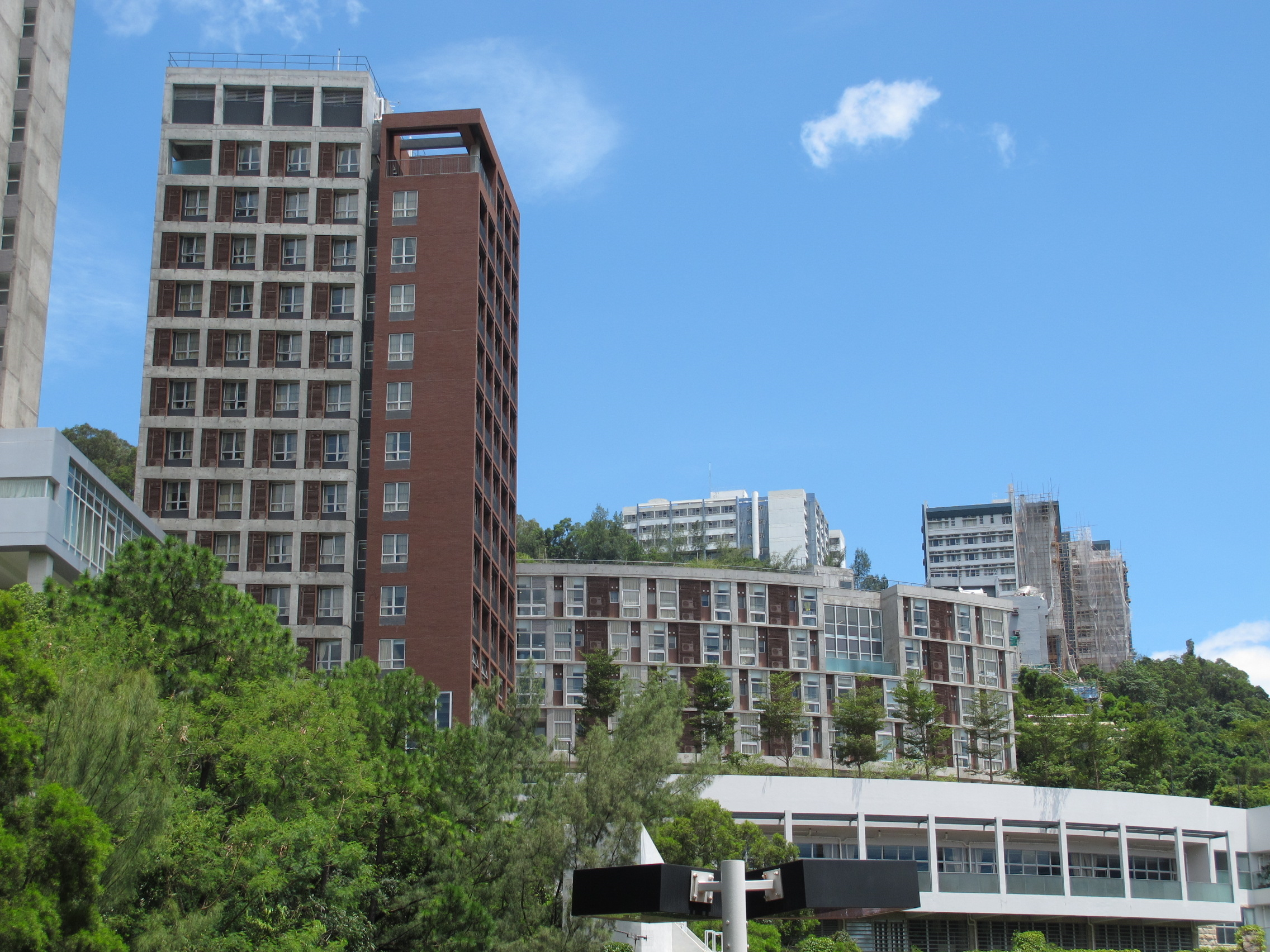
The view of Morningside College from The Sir Philip Haddon-Cave Sports Field.

== Campus location ==
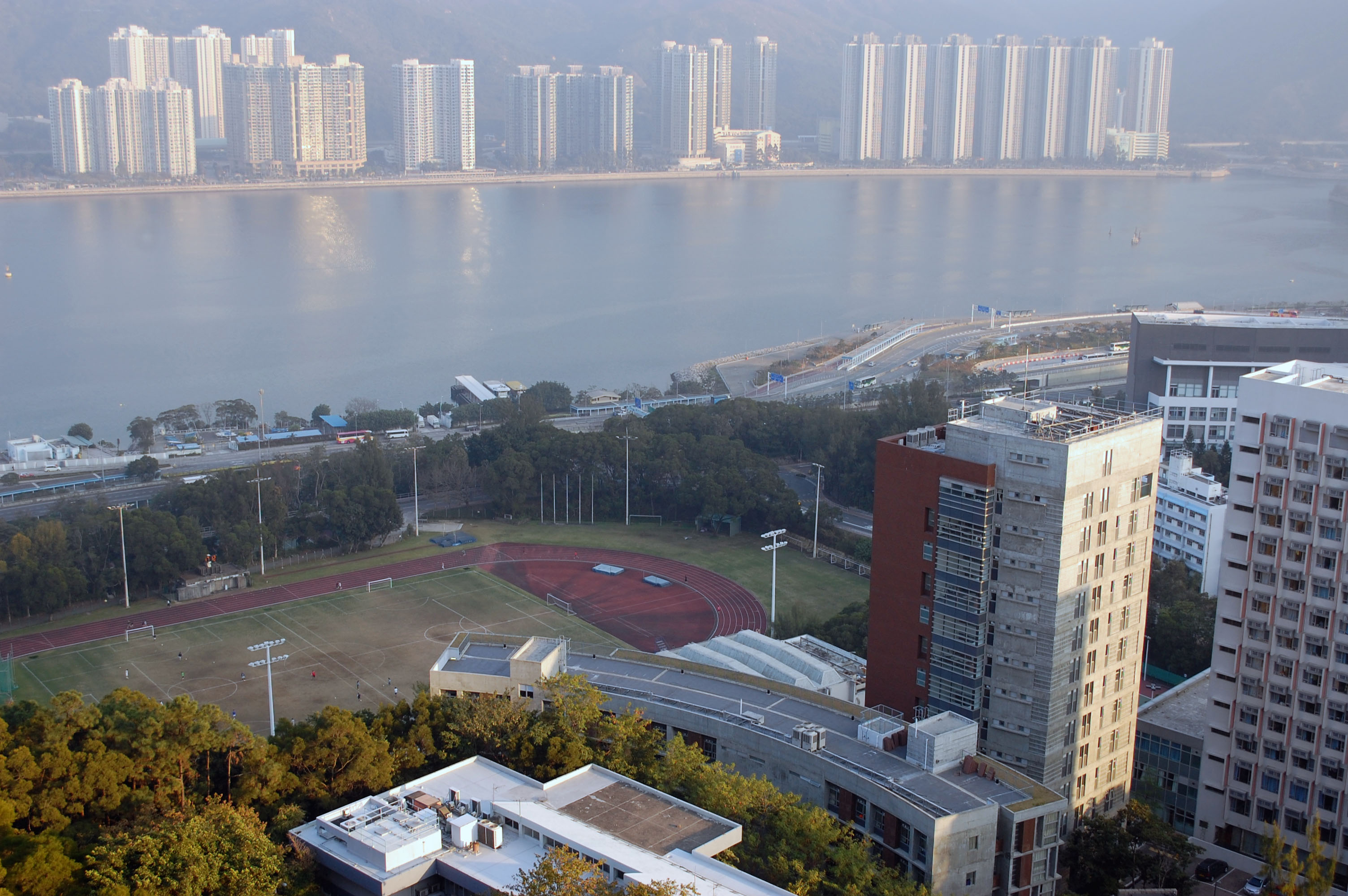
Morningside campus overlooking the Sir Philip Haddon-Cave Sports Field and Tide Cove.

Morningside is located between the central campus and Chung Chi College, next to the Sports Centre at the eastern end of the University, directly beside S.H. Ho College. The College is set against the contour of the hills commanding a full view of Tolo Harbour and is within walking distance of the University Mall, Library and University station.
