= United College of Hong Kong =

College of Chinese University of Hong Kong

Coordinates: 22°25′16″N 114°12′17″E

The United College of Hong Kong
- 香港聯合書院
- Motto: 明德新民 (Classical Chinese)
- Motto in English: Make one's virtues shine and renew the people
- Type: Public
- Established: June 1956; 70 years ago
- Affiliations: The Chinese University of Hong Kong
- Chairman: Yan Hau-yee Lina
- Dean: Lau Hang Yung Alaster
- Head: Jimmy Chai-mei Yu
- Administrative staff: 300
- Students: 2,902]
- Location: Ma Liu Shui, Sha Tin, New Territories, Hong Kong
- Campus: Rural
- Website: uc.cuhk.edu.hk

Chinese name
- Traditional Chinese: 香港聯合書院
Transcriptions
Yue: Cantonese
- Yale Romanization: Hēung góng lyùhn hahp syū yuhn
- Jyutping: Hoeng1 gong2 lyun4 hap6 syu1 jyun6

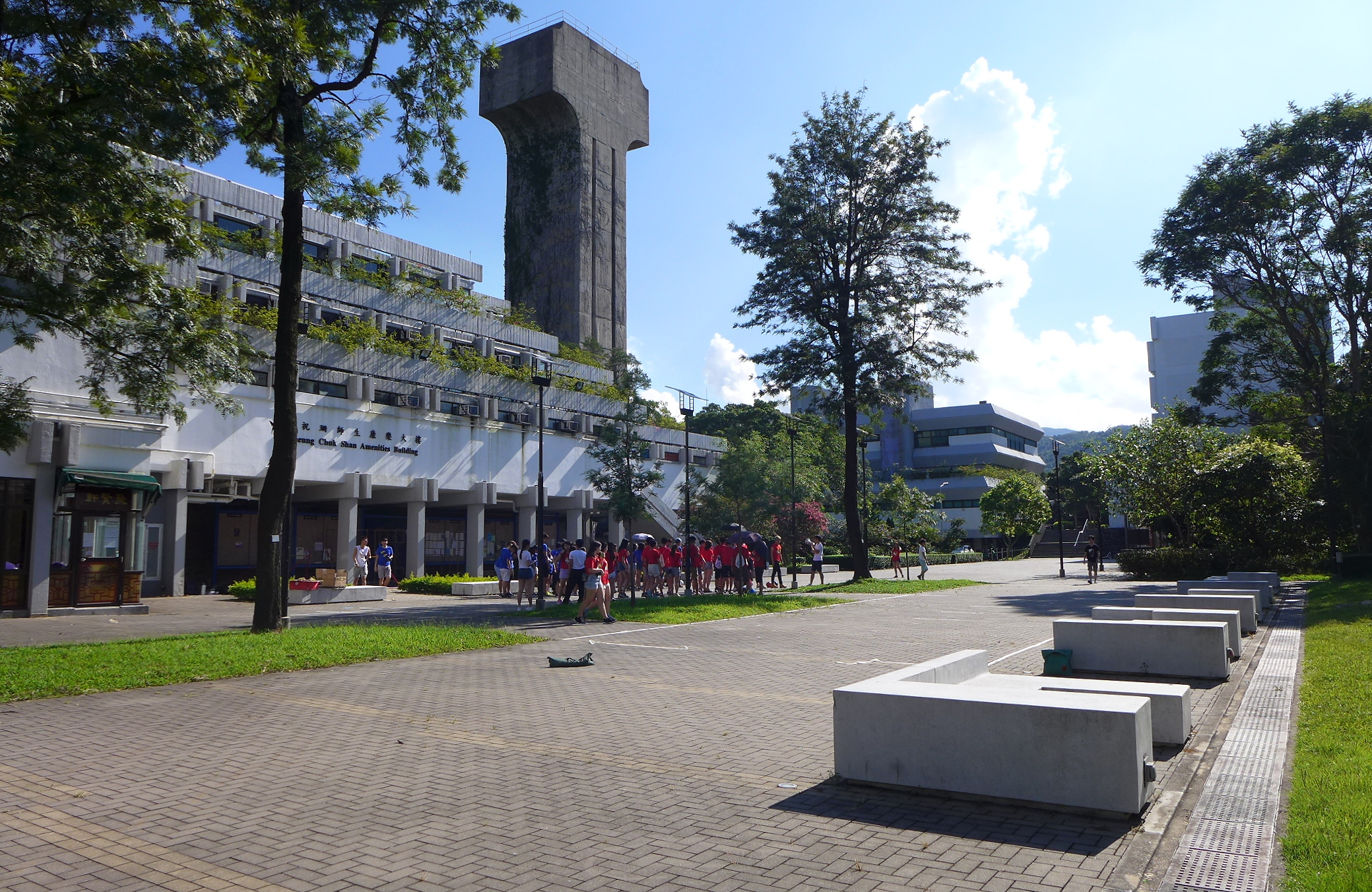
United College of Hong Kong Campus

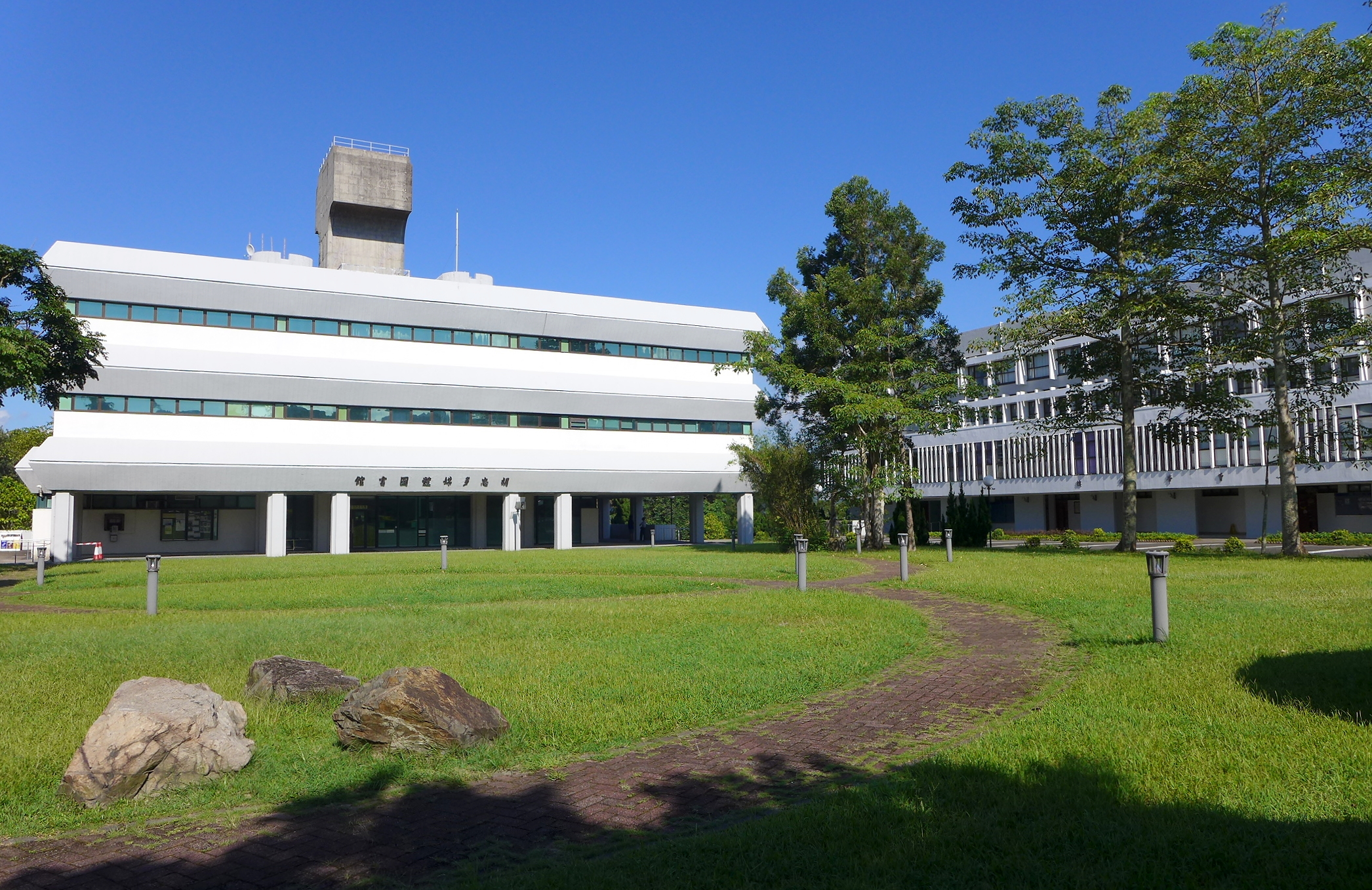
Buildings and the lawn inside Campus

The United College of Hong Kong is one of the constituent colleges of the Chinese University of Hong Kong, a public university in New Territories, Hong Kong. The college is one of the three original colleges when the university was founded in 1963. It was founded in June 1956 by the amalgamation of five colleges: Wah Kiu, Canton Overseas, Wen Hua, Kwang Hsia and Ping Jing, members of a group of post-secondary colleges or former private universities based in Kwangtung (Guangdong).

== Motto ==
The motto of the United College is "Ming De Xin Min" (明德新民), meaning "make one's virtues shine and renew the people". It was modified from a passage in the old classic The Great Learning (大學).

== College heads ==
Heads of United College:

1. Dr Tseung Fat-im (1957–1959)
2. Dr Lin Dao-yang (1960–1963)
3. Dr Cheng Tung-choy (1963–1977)
4. Professor Hsueh Shou-sheng (1977–1980)
5. Professor Chen Tien-chi (陳天機) (1980–1988)
6. Professor Lee Cheuk-yu (1988–1998)
7. Professor Wong Kwan-yiu (1998–2002)
8. Professor Fung Kwok-pui (2002–2012)
9. Professor Yu Jimmy Chai-mei (2012 – 2023)
10. Professor Stephen H S Wong (2023 – present)

== Main buildings and facilities ==
=== Tsang Shiu Tim Building ===
The administrative building of the United College. Choi Koon Shum General Education Resource Centre, established in 1995, is located on the fourth floor of the building.

=== T. C. Cheng Building ===
A building mainly serves for educational purposes.

==== Si Yuan Amenities Centre ====
Established in 2001, it is located on the lower ground floor of T. C. Cheng Building. Its most well-known feature is the bar, which is the only one in the Chinese University of Hong Kong. It also has a karaoke lounge and a pool table for the use of students, staff and alumni.

=== Wu Chung Multimedia Library ===
The majority of the multimedia resources of the university can be found in the library. The library is well equipped by computers capable in playing various multimedia resources. Tien Chi Microcomputer Laboratory is situated on the ground floor of the library, providing computers for students' use.

=== Cheung Chuk Shan Amenities Building ===
The main amenities building of the college. The Student Union, gymnasium, non-residential halls (Ping Fan Hall and Pak Chuen Hall), student canteen and staff restaurant are all found in the building.

=== Si Yuan Amphitheatre ===
Established in 2006, it serves as a multi-purpose outdoor theatre.

=== Tennis Courts ===
The two courts are managed by the Physical Education Unit. They are located at the junction of United Road and Residence Road.

== Student hostels ==
The United College has a total of four student hostels which can accommodate around 1200 students.

=== Adam Schall Residence ===
Established in 1971, Adam Schall Residence is the College's first and largest student hostel, and was built jointly with the Society of Jesus. The Adam Schall Residence underwent major renovation and spatial re-organization in the summer of 2007. Since then the 5-storey building houses a total of 440 students of both genders, separated into two wings. The building comprises mainly triple rooms, each equipped with air-conditioning and fans. Facilities provided include a multipurpose hall, 7 pantries (the biggest one is shared by both genders), 2 study rooms (one for each gender), table-tennis tables, a television room, a tuck shop, a music room, etc. A unique feature of Adam Schall Residence is that it houses a chapel offering Catholic services for the benefit of the entire University.

=== Bethlehem Hall ===
The Bethlehem Hall was established in 1978. It is located next to the Adam Schall Residence and provides places for about 230 students. It consists of five floors, with students of different genders on different floors. Facilities provided include a common room, a study room, etc.

=== Hang Seng Hall ===
Hang Seng Hall was established in 1986 and provides around 280 places for students of both gender. For the first to third floor is for male and the forth to sixth floor is for female. Facilities include a tuck shop, a snooker table, etc.

=== Chan Chun Ha Hostel ===
The Chan Chun Ha Hostel, established in 2004, is the newest of the four hostels. It provides around 300 places for students. It consists of ten floors. On the top floor a bridge connects the hostel with the campus of United College.

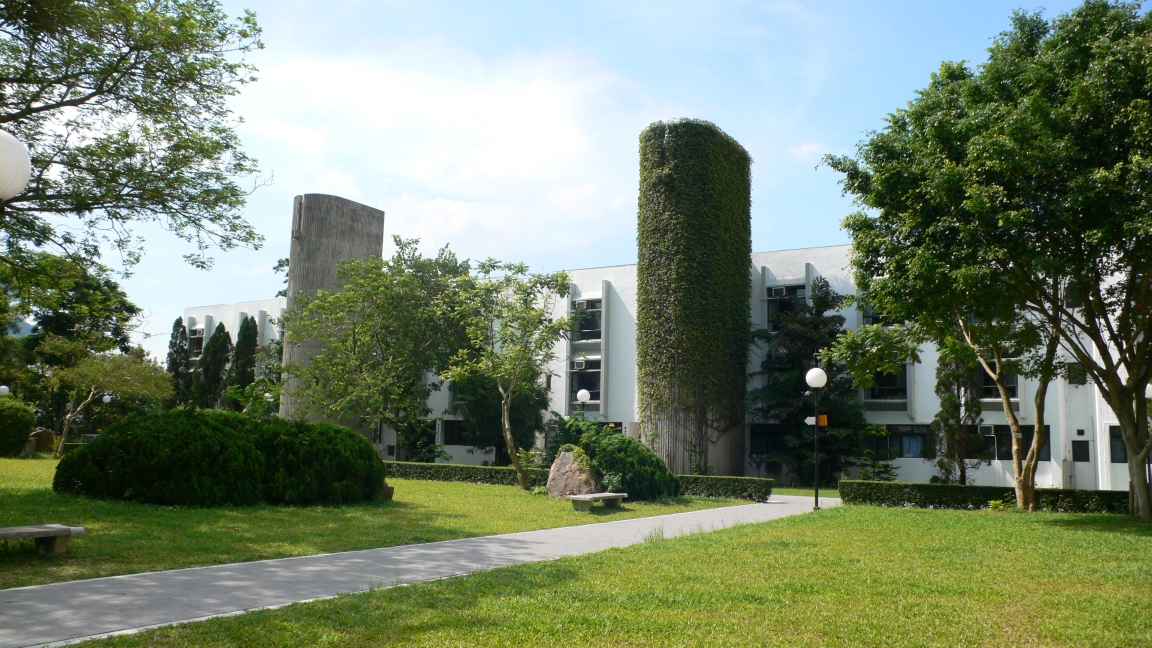
Adam Schall Residence

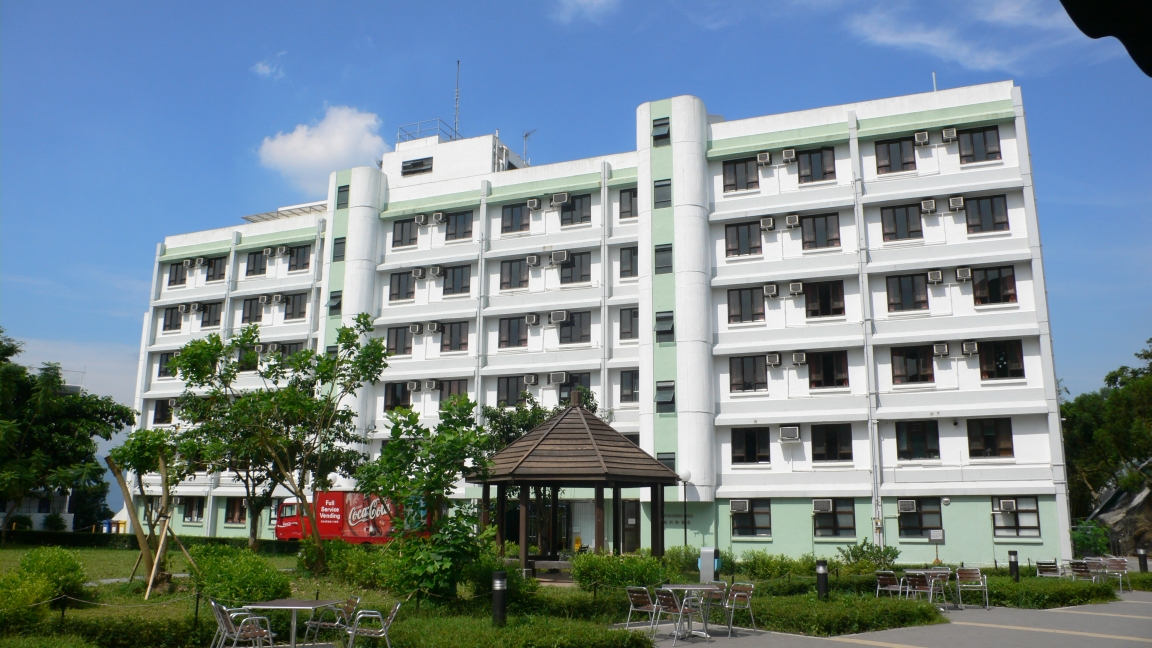
Bethlehem Hall

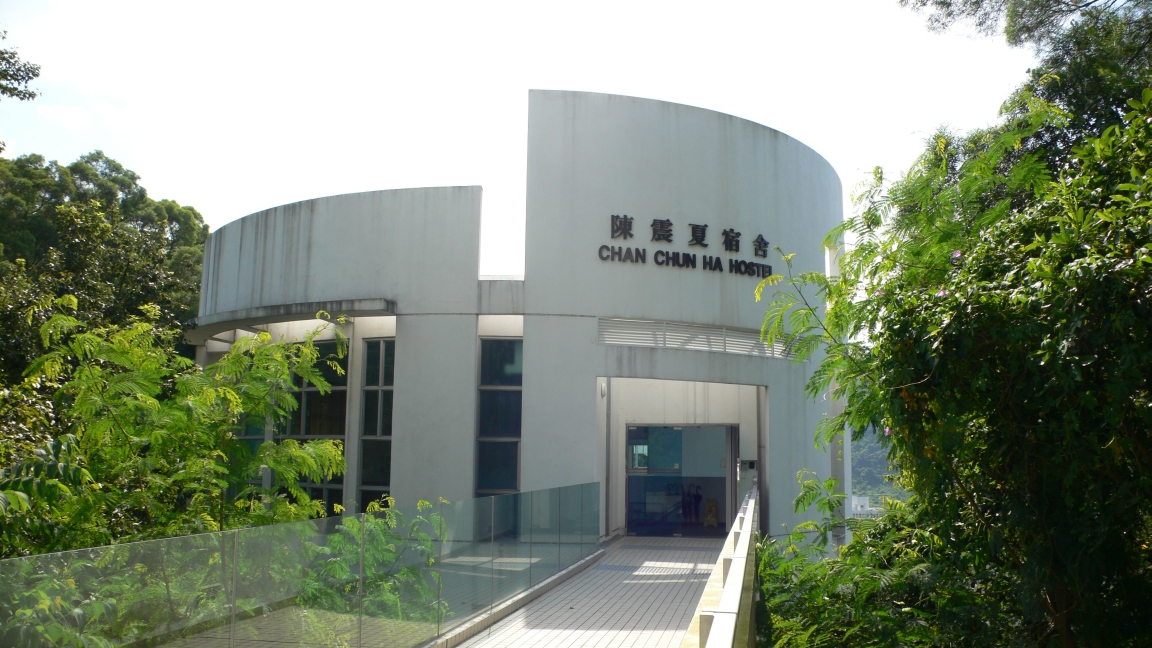
Chan Chun Ha Hostel

== Landmarks ==
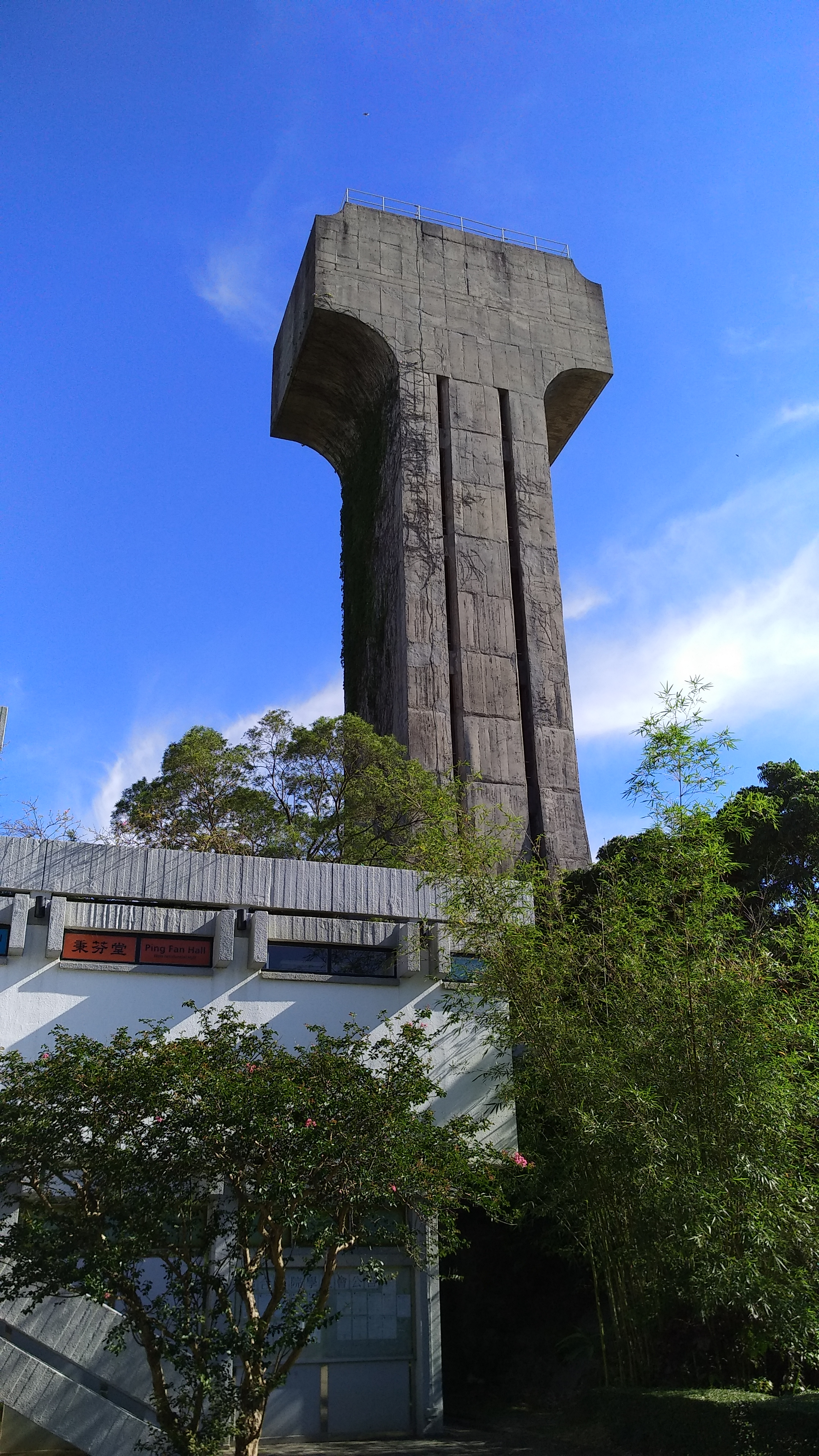
Water Tower

- Ming De Mural
- United College Water Tower
- United College Cascade
- United College Time Capsule
- Sculptures
  - Glorious United Man
  - Release
  - Cavort
  - Dancer
  - Ultimate Cosmos
  - Om
  - Phoenix Dance
