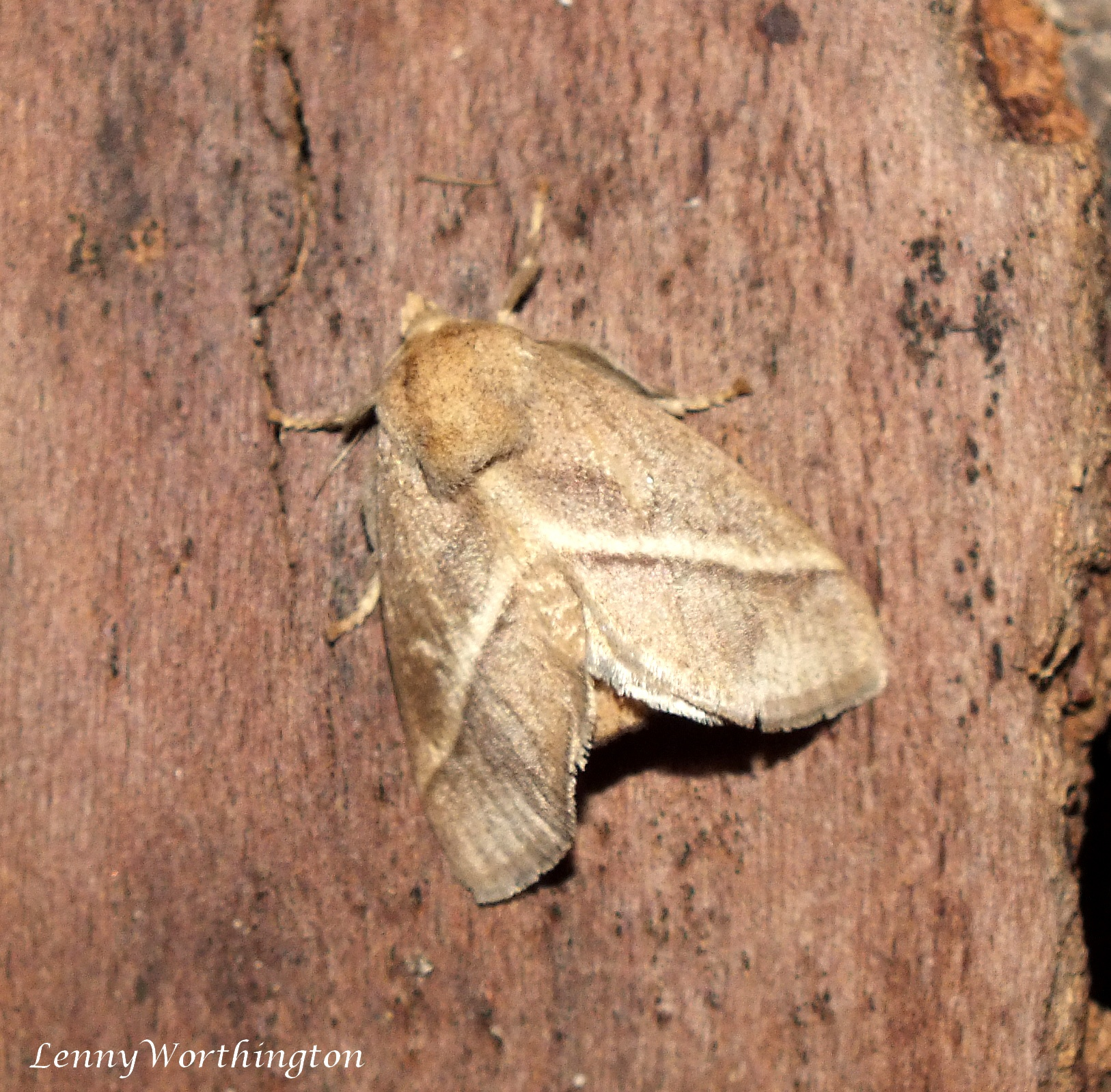
- Thosea rara

Scientific classification
- Kingdom: Animalia
- Phylum: Arthropoda
- Class: Insecta
- Order: Lepidoptera
- Family: Limacodidae
- Subfamily: Limacodinae
- Genus: Thosea; Walker, 1855

Synonyms
- Anzabe Walker, 1855; Autocopa Meyrick, 1889; Dasycomota Lower, 1902

= Thosea =

Genus of moths

Thosea is a genus of moths of the family Limacodidae first described by Francis Walker in 1855.

== Species ==
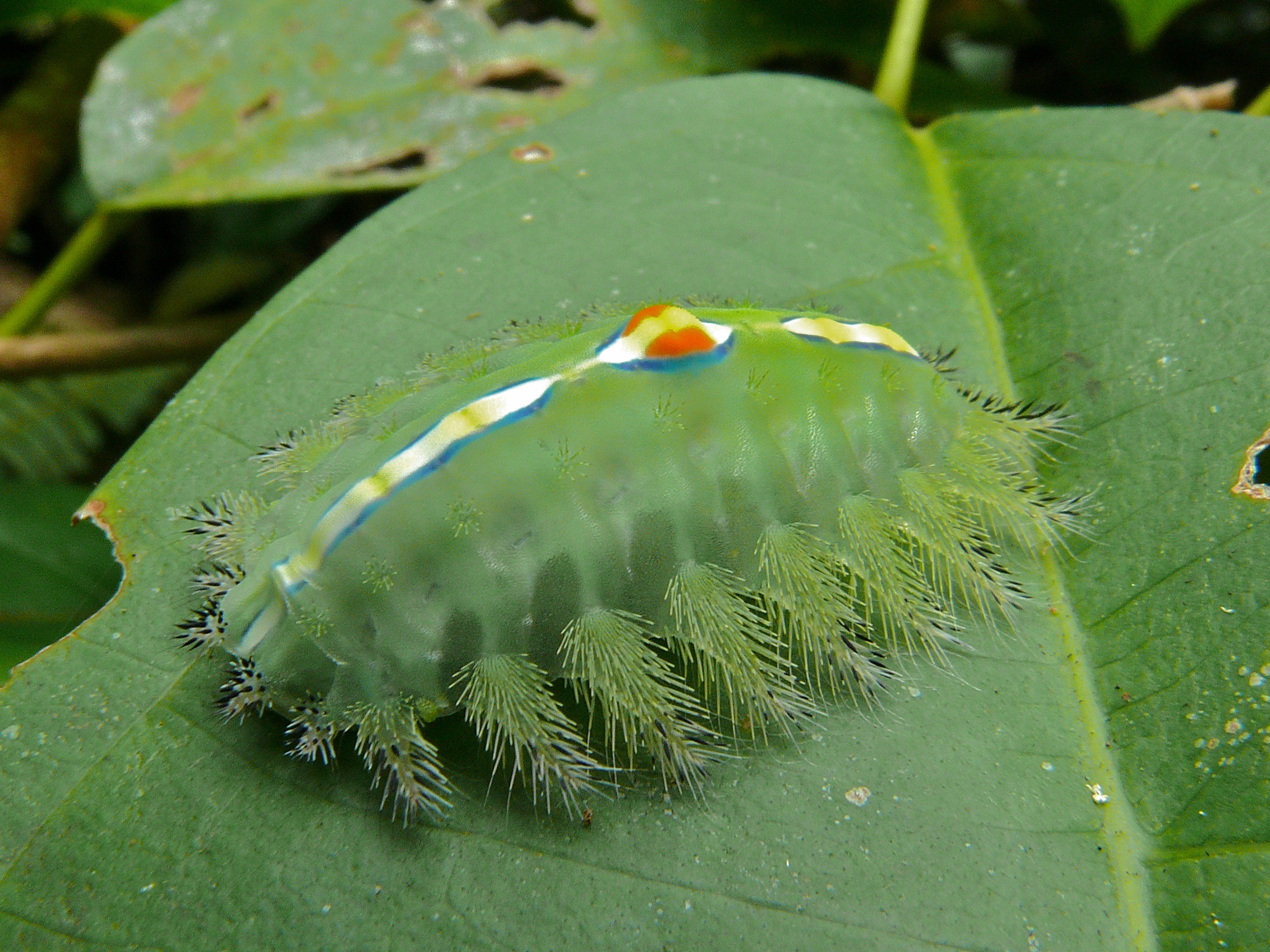
larva of Thosea vetusta

- Thosea albiviata
- Thosea aperiens
- Thosea arizana
- Thosea asigna
- Thosea axiothea
- Thosea barikoti
- Thosea bhaga
- Thosea bicolor
- Thosea biguttata
- Thosea bipartita
- Thosea bisura
- Thosea bisuroides
- Thosea borneensis
- Thosea caliginosa
- Thosea cana
- Thosea cataractae
- Thosea catori
- Thosea cervina
- Thosea chrysoparala
- Thosea cinereomarginata
- Thosea conicosma
- Thosea conspersa
- Thosea coreana
- Thosea cotesi
- Thosea cruda
- Thosea curvinervis
- Thosea curvistriga
- Thosea discipunctata
- Thosea duplexa
- Thosea erectistriga
- Thosea ferreogrisea
- Thosea flavina
- Thosea fluxa
- Thosea grandis
- Thosea imitabilis
- Thosea interrupta
- Thosea irrorata
- Thosea jasea
- Thosea kinabalua
- Thosea lateritia
- Thosea lipara
- Thosea loesa
- Thosea lutea
- Thosea magna
- Thosea mediostriga
- Thosea minima
- Thosea mixta
- Thosea moluccana
- Thosea monoloncha
- Thosea nigribasis
- Thosea nigrifasciata
- Thosea nitobeana
- Thosea nubeculosa
- Thosea obliquistriga
- Thosea penthima
- Thosea perseis
- Thosea phaeobasis
- Thosea platti
- Thosea plethoneura
- Thosea plumbea
- Thosea porthetes
- Thosea pyrrhoea
- Thosea rara
- Thosea recta
- Thosea rufa
- Thosea rufimacula
- Thosea separata
- Thosea sericea
- Thosea serrata
- Thosea sinensis
- Thosea sythoffi
- Thosea taiwania
- Thosea threnopis
- Thosea toxozona
- Thosea transversata
- Thosea tripartita
- Thosea undosa
- Thosea unifascia
- Thosea vetusta
