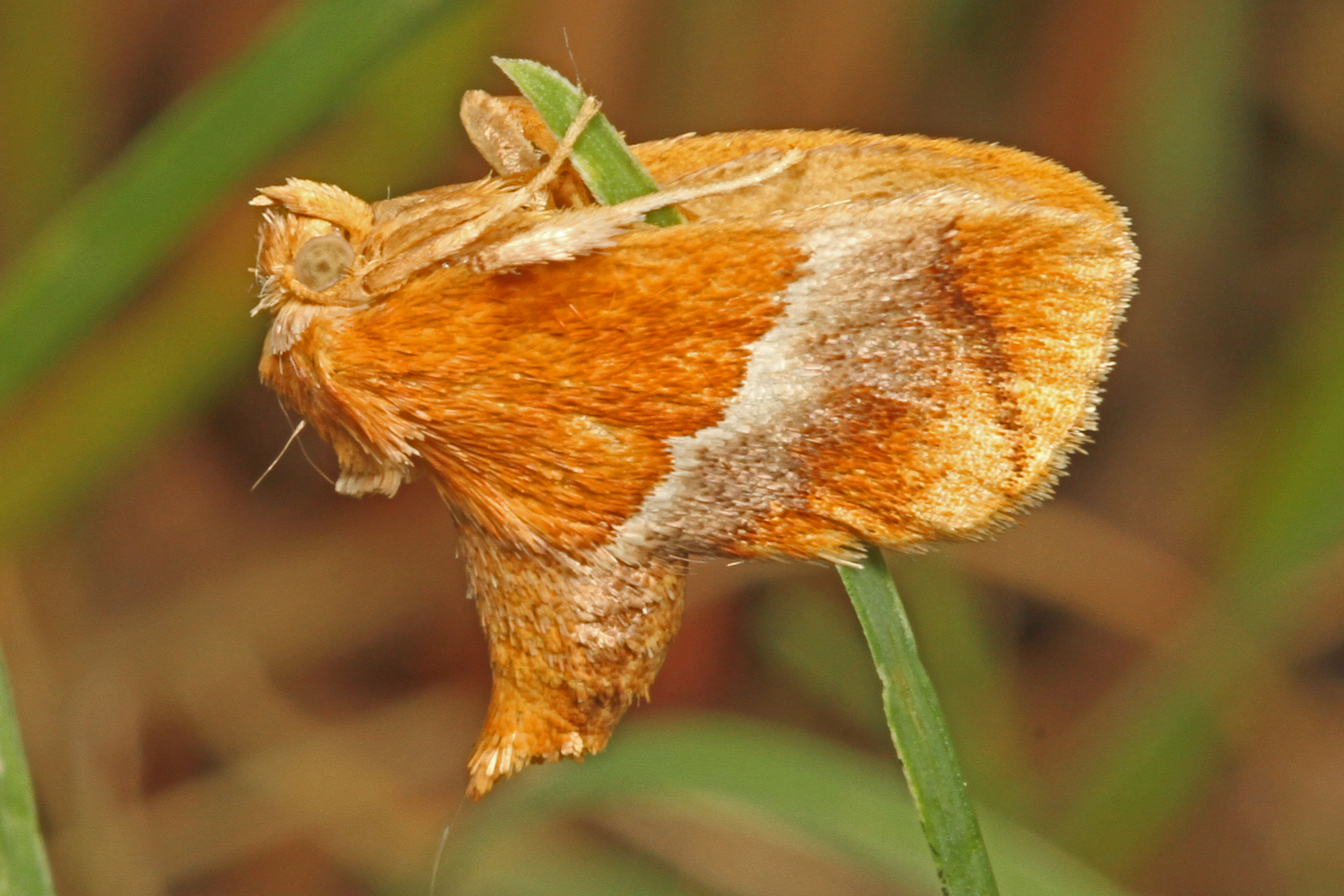

Scientific classification
- Domain: Eukaryota
- Kingdom: Animalia
- Phylum: Arthropoda
- Class: Insecta
- Order: Lepidoptera
- Family: Limacodidae
- Genus: Lithacodes
- Species: L. gracea

Binomial name
- Lithacodes gracea Dyar, 1921

= Lithacodes gracea =

Species of moth

Lithacodes gracea, the graceful slug moth, is a species of slug caterpillar moth in the family Limacodidae.

The MONA or Hodges number for Lithacodes gracea is 4664.
