= Thosea aperiens =

Scientific classification
- Kingdom: Animalia
- Phylum: Arthropoda
- Class: Insecta
- Order: Lepidoptera
- Family: Limacodidae
- Genus: Thosea
- Species: T. aperiens

Binomial name
- Thosea aperiens Walker, 1865

Species of moth

Thosea aperiens, the stinging caterpillar, is a moth of the family Limacodidae. The species was first described by Francis Walker in 1865. It is found in Sri Lanka and India.

Its larval host plants are Dunbaria henryi, Lablab purpureus, cowpea, Calotropis gigantea and Ziziphus jujuba.
