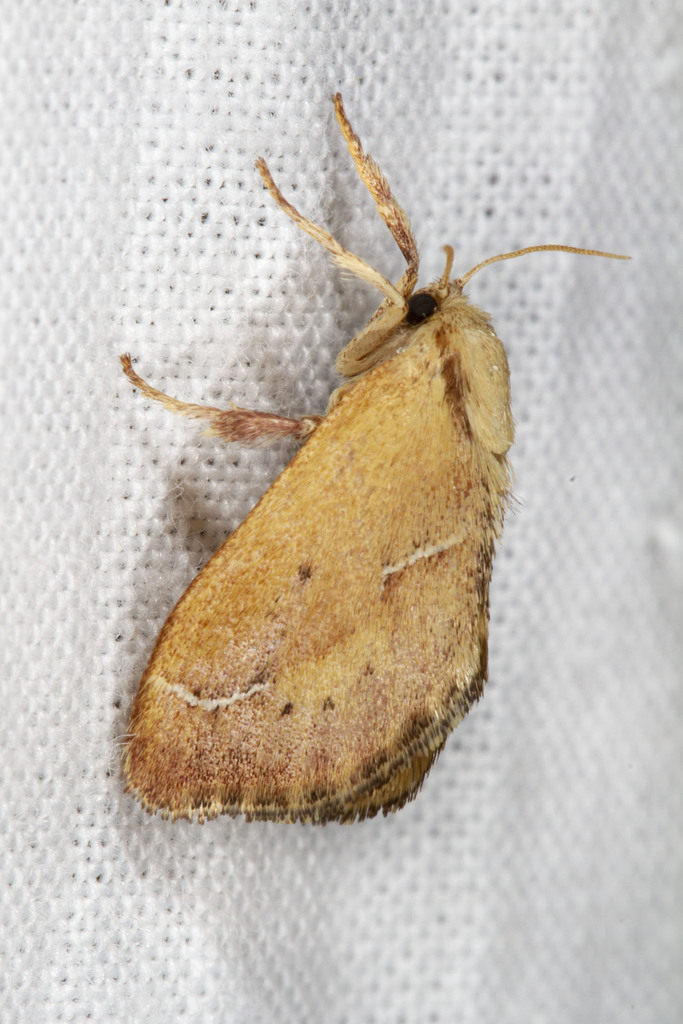

Scientific classification
- Kingdom: Animalia
- Phylum: Arthropoda
- Clade: Pancrustacea
- Class: Insecta
- Order: Lepidoptera
- Family: Limacodidae
- Genus: Adoneta
- Species: A. bicaudata

Binomial name
- Adoneta bicaudata Dyar, 1904

= Adoneta bicaudata =

Species of moth

Adoneta bicaudata, the long-horned slug moth, is a species of slug caterpillar moth in the family Limacodidae.
