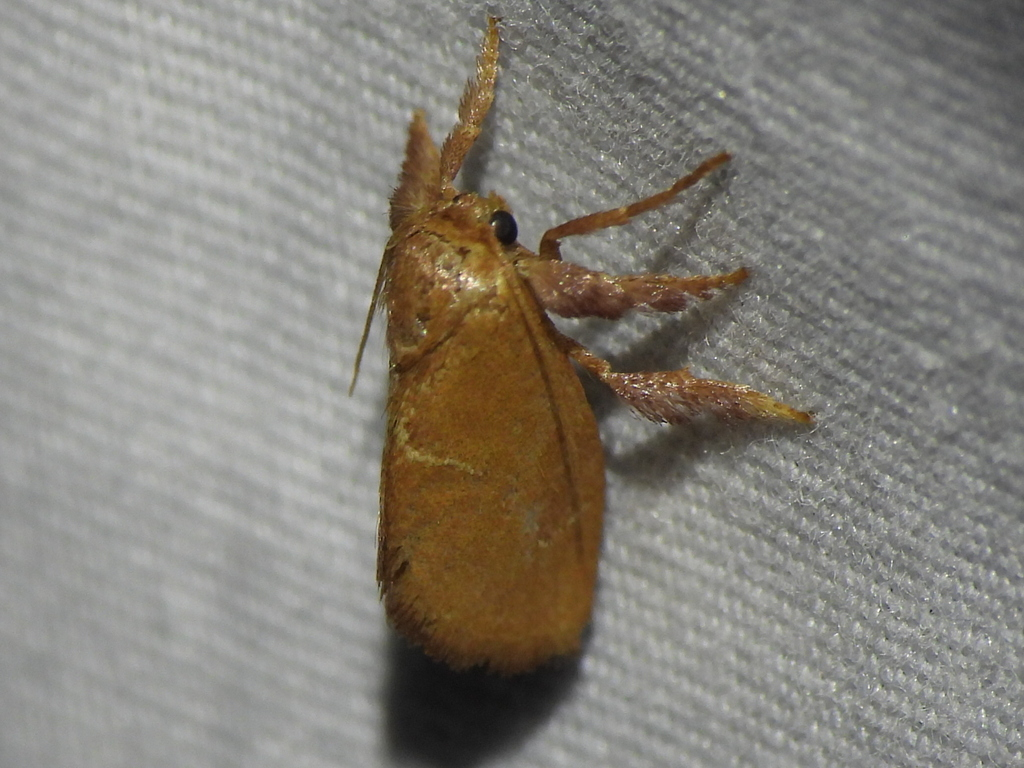

Scientific classification
- Kingdom: Animalia
- Phylum: Arthropoda
- Clade: Pancrustacea
- Class: Insecta
- Order: Lepidoptera
- Family: Limacodidae
- Genus: Adoneta
- Species: A. pygmaea

Binomial name
- Adoneta pygmaea G. & R., 1868

= Adoneta pygmaea =

Species of moth

Adoneta pygmaea is a species of slug caterpillar moth in the family Limacodidae. The MONA number for Adoneta pygmaea is 4683.
