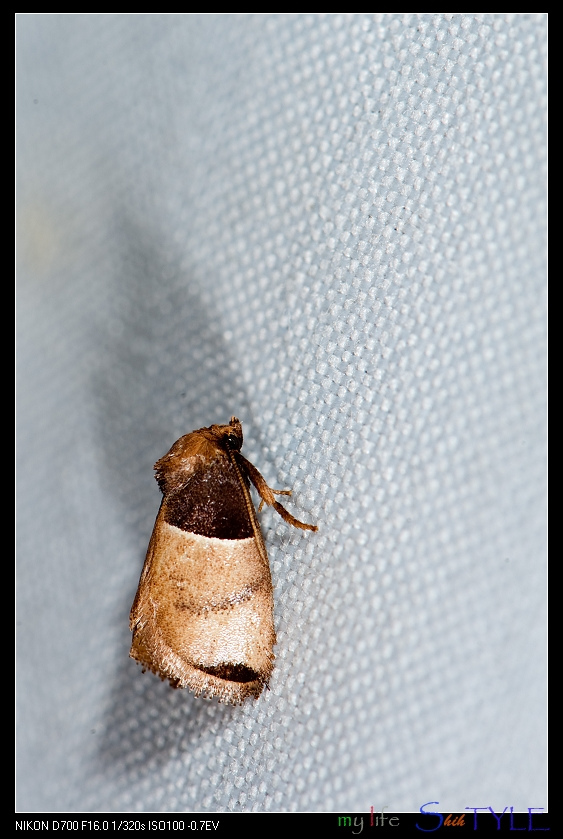

Scientific classification
- Domain: Eukaryota
- Kingdom: Animalia
- Phylum: Arthropoda
- Class: Insecta
- Order: Lepidoptera
- Family: Limacodidae
- Genus: Pseudidonauton
- Species: P. chihpyh

Binomial name
- Pseudidonauton chihpyh Solovyev, 2009

= Pseudidonauton chihpyh =

Species of moth

Pseudidonauton chihpyh is a species of moth of the family Limacodidae. It is found in Taiwan at altitudes between 400 and 500 meters.

The wingspan is about 14 mm for males and 19 mm for females. Adults have been recorded in early April and the first half of June.
