= Austrapoda seres =

Scientific classification
- Domain: Eukaryota
- Kingdom: Animalia
- Phylum: Arthropoda
- Class: Insecta
- Order: Lepidoptera
- Family: Limacodidae
- Genus: Austrapoda
- Species: A. seres

Binomial name
- Austrapoda seres Solovyev, 2009

Species of moth

Austrapoda seres is a species of moth of the family Limacodidae. It is found in China (Chekiang and Shaanxi) on an altitudes of 1,600 meters.

The wingspan is 24–27 mm. Adults have been recorded in June and July.
