= Atosioides accola =

Scientific classification
- Domain: Eukaryota
- Kingdom: Animalia
- Phylum: Arthropoda
- Class: Insecta
- Order: Lepidoptera
- Family: Limacodidae
- Genus: Atosioides
- Species: A. accola

Binomial name
- Atosioides accola Solovyev, 2009

Species of moth

Atosioides accola is a species of moth of the family Limacodidae. It is found in western Sumatra and southern Thailand on altitudes between 130 and 1,000 meters.

The wingspan is about 17 mm. Adults have been recorded in mid September and early December.
