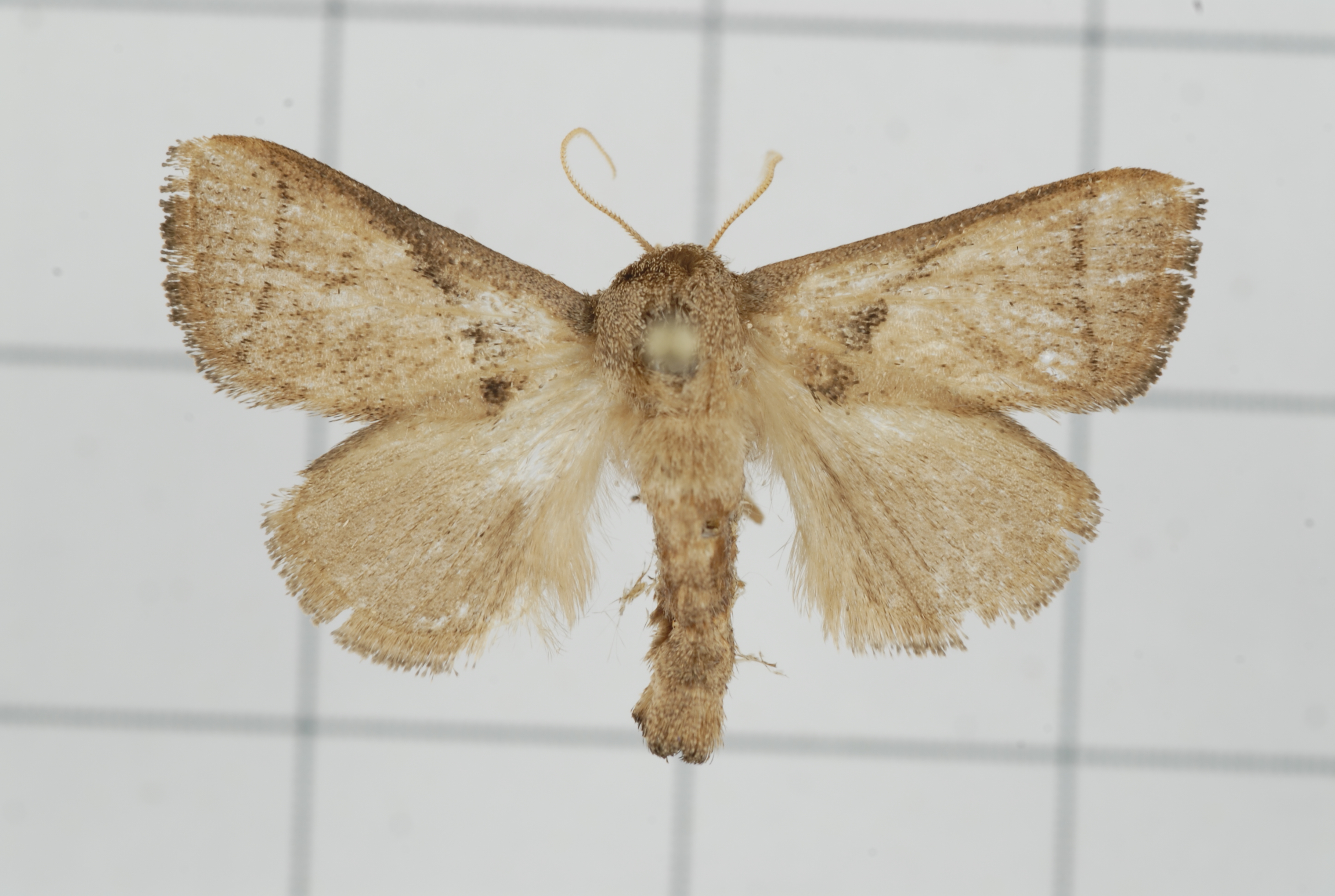

Scientific classification
- Kingdom: Animalia
- Phylum: Arthropoda
- Clade: Pancrustacea
- Class: Insecta
- Order: Lepidoptera
- Family: Limacodidae
- Genus: Thosea
- Species: T. cana

Binomial name
- Thosea cana Walker, 1865

= Thosea cana =

Species of moth

Thosea cana, is a moth of the family Limacodidae first described by Francis Walker, an oriental entomologist in 1865. It is endemic to Sri Lanka, India and Taiwan.
