= Austrapoda hepatica =

Scientific classification
- Kingdom: Animalia
- Phylum: Arthropoda
- Class: Insecta
- Order: Lepidoptera
- Family: Limacodidae
- Genus: Austrapoda
- Species: A. hepatica

Binomial name
- Austrapoda hepatica Inoue, 1987

Species of moth

Austrapoda hepatica is a species of moth of the family Limacodidae. It is found in Japan.
