= Euphlyctinides aeneola =

Scientific classification
- Domain: Eukaryota
- Kingdom: Animalia
- Phylum: Arthropoda
- Class: Insecta
- Order: Lepidoptera
- Family: Limacodidae
- Genus: Euphlyctinides
- Species: E. aeneola

Binomial name
- Euphlyctinides aeneola Solovyev, 2009

Species of moth

Euphlyctinides aeneola is a species of moth of the family Limacodidae. It is found in northern and western Thailand at altitudes of 400 to 1,400 meters.

The wingspan is 20–22 mm. Adults are on wing from mid-June to August and in October.

== Etymology ==
The species name is derived from Latin aeneolus (meaning "produced from bronze") and refers to the colouration of the species.
