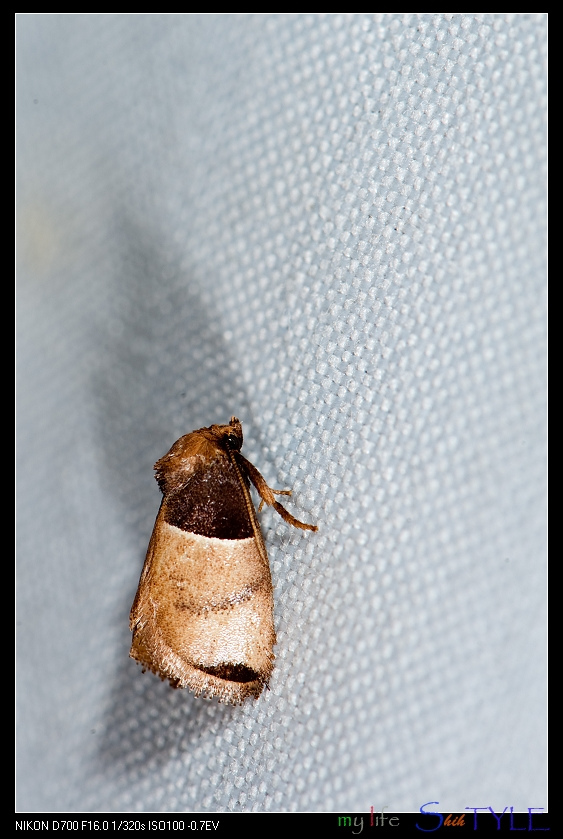
- Pseudidonauton chihpyh

Scientific classification
- Domain: Eukaryota
- Kingdom: Animalia
- Phylum: Arthropoda
- Class: Insecta
- Order: Lepidoptera
- Clade: Apoditrysia
- Superfamily: Zygaenoidea
- Family: Limacodidae
- Genus: Pseudidonauton; Hering, 1931

= Pseudidonauton =

Genus of moths

Pseudidonauton is a genus of moths of the family Limacodidae.

== Species ==
- Pseudidonauton admirabile Hering, 1931
- Pseudidonauton bhaga Swinhoe, 1901
- Pseudidonauton chihpyh Solovyev, 2009
- Pseudidonauton nigribasis Hampson, 1905
- Pseudidonauton puera Wu, Solovyev & Han, 2021
- Pseudidonauton siamica Solovyev, 2009
- Pseudidonauton sinensis Wu, Solovyev & Han, 2021
- Pseudidonauton vexa Solovyev, 2009
