= Euphlyctinides indi =

Scientific classification
- Domain: Eukaryota
- Kingdom: Animalia
- Phylum: Arthropoda
- Class: Insecta
- Order: Lepidoptera
- Family: Limacodidae
- Genus: Euphlyctinides
- Species: E. indi

Binomial name
- Euphlyctinides indi Solovyev, 2009

Species of moth

Euphlyctinides indi is a species of moth of the family Limacodidae. It is found in north-eastern India at an altitude of 1,800 meters.

The wingspan is about 22 mm.
