= Strigivenifera venata =

Scientific classification
- Kingdom: Animalia
- Phylum: Arthropoda
- Clade: Pancrustacea
- Class: Insecta
- Order: Lepidoptera
- Family: Limacodidae
- Genus: Strigivenifera
- Species: S. venata

Binomial name
- Strigivenifera venata Aurivillius, 1895

Species of moth

Strigivenifera venata is a species of moth in the family Limacodidae. It was described by Per Olof Christopher Aurivillius in 1895. This species can be found along the Bight of Biafra.
