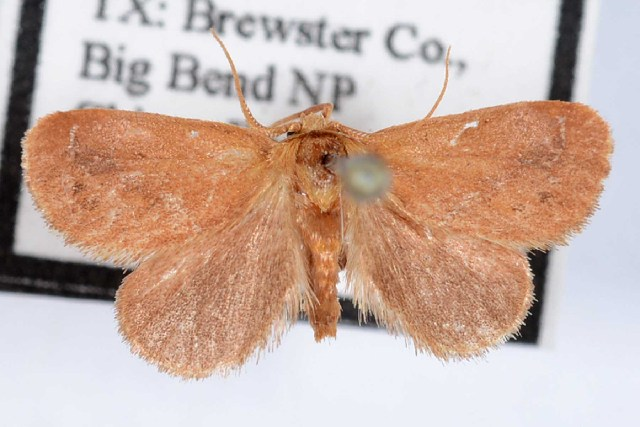

Scientific classification
- Kingdom: Animalia
- Phylum: Arthropoda
- Clade: Pancrustacea
- Class: Insecta
- Order: Lepidoptera
- Family: Limacodidae
- Genus: Adoneta
- Species: A. gemina

Binomial name
- Adoneta gemina Dyar, 1906

= Adoneta gemina =

Species of moth

Adoneta gemina is a species of moth in the family Limacodidae (slug caterpillar moths), in the superfamily Zygaenoidea (flannel, slug caterpillar, leaf skeletonizer moths and kin). It was described by Harrison Gray Dyar Jr. in 1906 from southern Texas.
