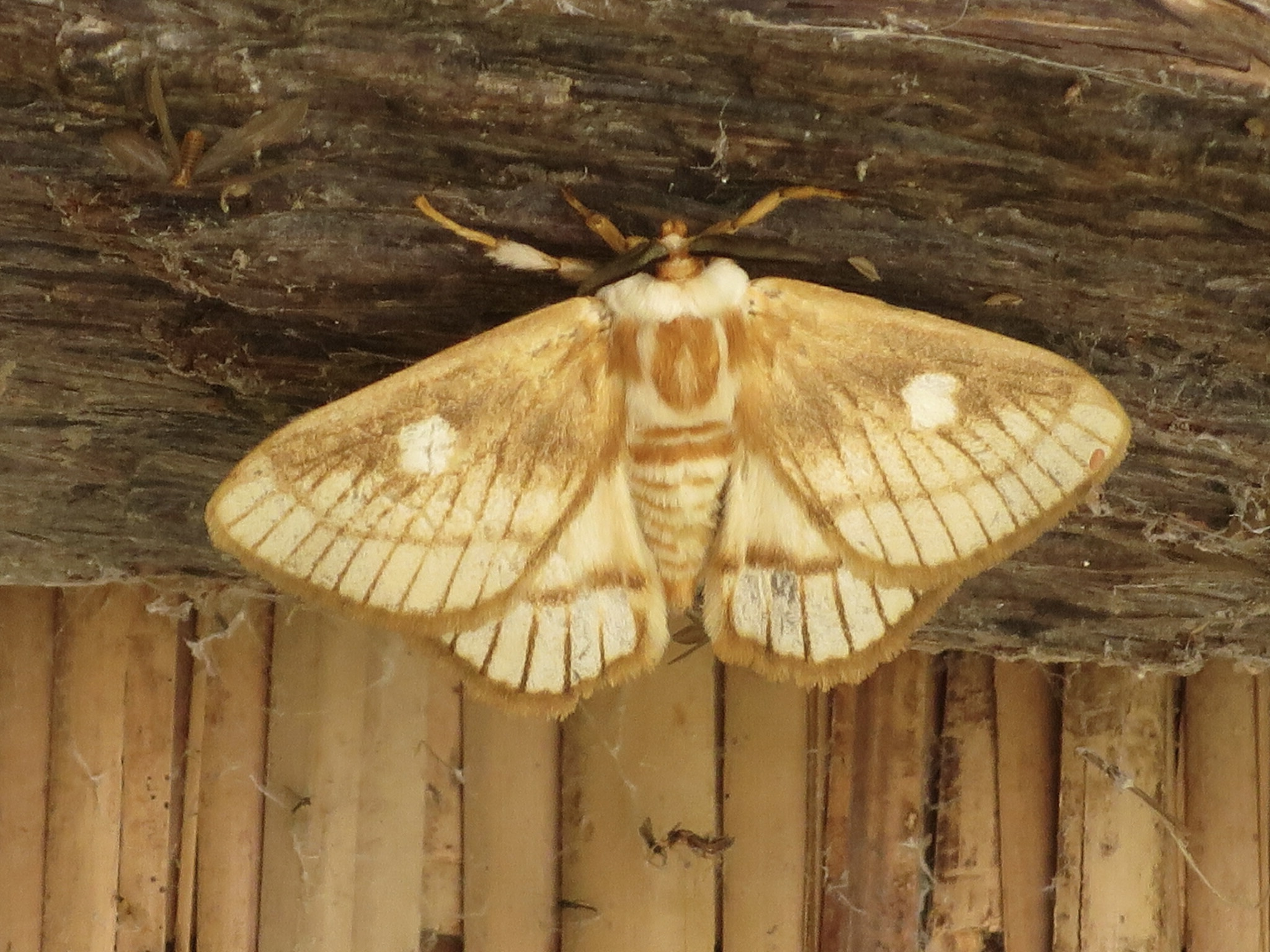
- Strigivenifera venata

Scientific classification
- Kingdom: Animalia
- Phylum: Arthropoda
- Clade: Pancrustacea
- Class: Insecta
- Order: Lepidoptera
- Family: Limacodidae
- Subfamily: Chrysopolominae
- Genus: Strigivenifera; Hering, 1937

= Strigivenifera =

Genus of moths

Strigivenifera is a genus of slug moths described by Erich Martin Hering in 1937.

== List of species ==
- Strigivenifera albidiscalis (Hampson, 1910)
- Strigivenifera bartschi Kurshakov & Zolotuhin, 2013
- Strigivenifera cruisa Kurshakov & Zolotuhin, 2013
- Strigivenifera eborea Kurshakov & Zolotuhin, 2013
- Strigivenifera livingstonei Kurshakov & Zolotuhin, 2013
- Strigivenifera marina Kurshakov & Zolotuhin, 2013
- Strigivenifera neo Kurshakov & Zolotuhin, 2013
- Strigivenifera ocellaris Kurshakov & Zolotuhin, 2013
- Strigivenifera oris Kurshakov & Zolotuhin, 2013
- Strigivenifera smithi Taberer, 2022
- Strigivenifera tanja Kurshakov & Zolotuhin, 2013
- Strigivenifera tatooifera Kurshakov & Zolotuhin, 2013
- Strigivenifera venata (Aurivillius, 1895)
