= Thosea cervina =

Scientific classification
- Domain: Eukaryota
- Kingdom: Animalia
- Phylum: Arthropoda
- Class: Insecta
- Order: Lepidoptera
- Family: Limacodidae
- Genus: Thosea
- Species: T. cervina

Binomial name
- Thosea cervina Moore, 1877

Species of moth

Thosea cervina is a moth of the family Limacodidae first described by Frederic Moore in 1877. It is found in Sri Lanka and India.

In the male, the upperside is a greenish fawn colour. Forewing with a transverse discal narrow, which is slightly curved to a dark brown band. There is a black spot at end of cell. Underside uniform brownish. There is a white spot at antennae base and on fore tibia.
