= Cheromettia ferruginea =

Scientific classification
- Kingdom: Animalia
- Phylum: Arthropoda
- Class: Insecta
- Order: Lepidoptera
- Family: Limacodidae
- Genus: Cheromettia
- Species: C. ferruginea

Binomial name
- Cheromettia ferruginea Moore, 1877

Species of moth

Cheromettia ferruginea is a moth of the family Limacodidae first described by Frederic Moore in 1877. It is found in Sri Lanka.

Larval host plant is Coffea species.
