= Strigivenifera eborea =

Scientific classification
- Kingdom: Animalia
- Phylum: Arthropoda
- Clade: Pancrustacea
- Class: Insecta
- Order: Lepidoptera
- Family: Limacodidae
- Genus: Strigivenifera
- Species: S. eborea

Binomial name
- Strigivenifera eborea Kurshakov & Zolotuhin, 2013

Synonyms
- Strigivenifera ocellaris Kurshakov & Zolotuhin, 2013

Species of moth

Strigivenifera eborea is a species of slug moth described by Kurshakov & Zolotuhin in 2013.
