= Pseudonagoda =

Scientific classification
- Kingdom: Animalia
- Phylum: Arthropoda
- Clade: Pancrustacea
- Class: Insecta
- Order: Lepidoptera
- Family: Limacodidae
- Genus: Pseudonagoda; Holloway, 1990

Genus of moths

Pseudonagoda is a genus of moths of the family Limacodidae.

== Species ==
- Pseudonagoda naessigi Holloway, 1990
- Pseudonagoda siniaevi Solovyev, 2009
