= Pseudidonauton admirabile =

Scientific classification
- Domain: Eukaryota
- Kingdom: Animalia
- Phylum: Arthropoda
- Class: Insecta
- Order: Lepidoptera
- Family: Limacodidae
- Genus: Pseudidonauton
- Species: P. admirabile

Binomial name
- Pseudidonauton admirabile Hering, 1931

Species of moth

Pseudidonauton admirabile is a species of moth of the family Limacodidae. It is found on Peninsular Malaysia.
