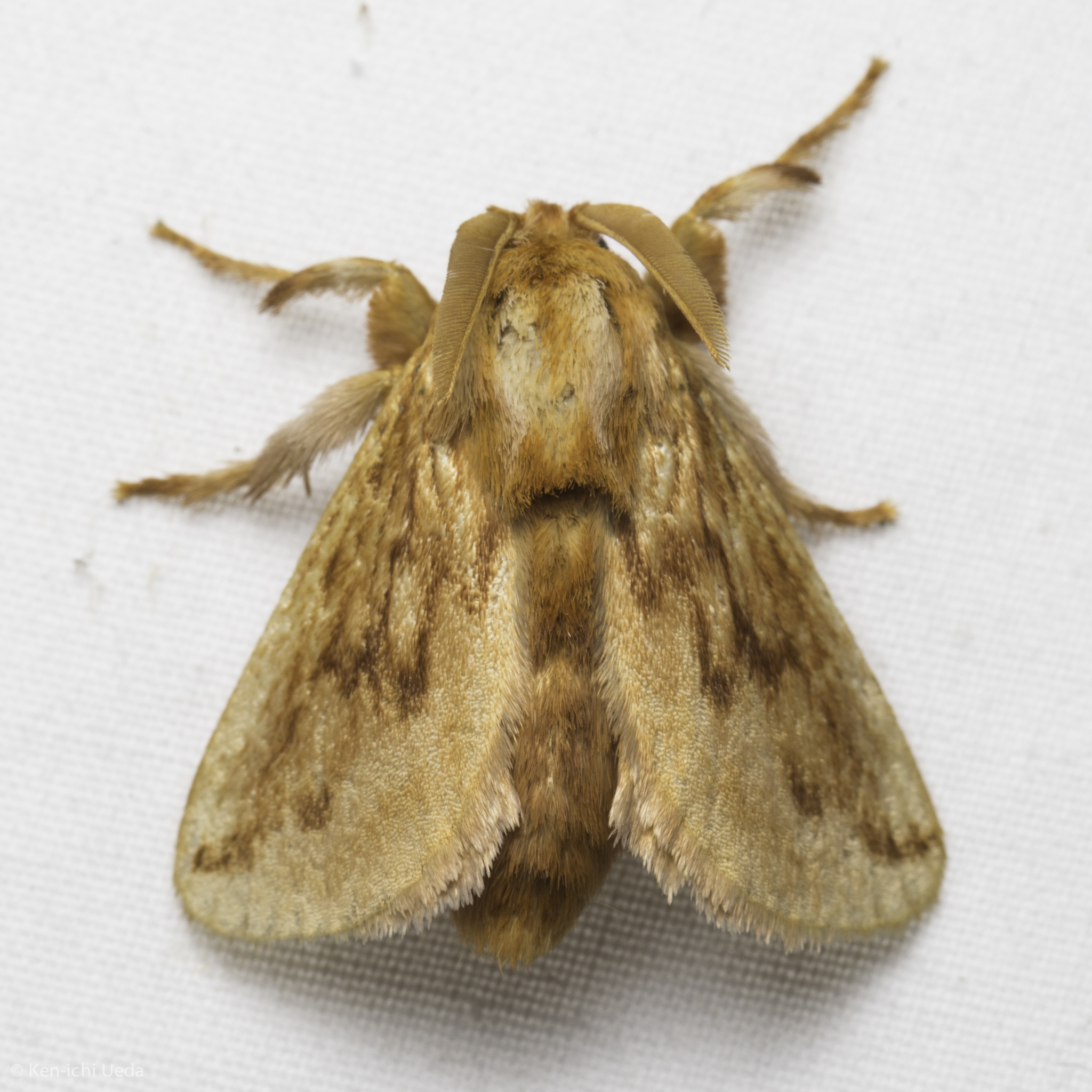

Scientific classification
- Kingdom: Animalia
- Phylum: Arthropoda
- Class: Insecta
- Order: Lepidoptera
- Family: Limacodidae
- Genus: Perola
- Species: P. sericea

Binomial name
- Perola sericea Möschler, 1878

= Perola sericea =

Species of moth

Perola sericea is a species of slug moth described by Heinrich Benno Möschler in 1878.
