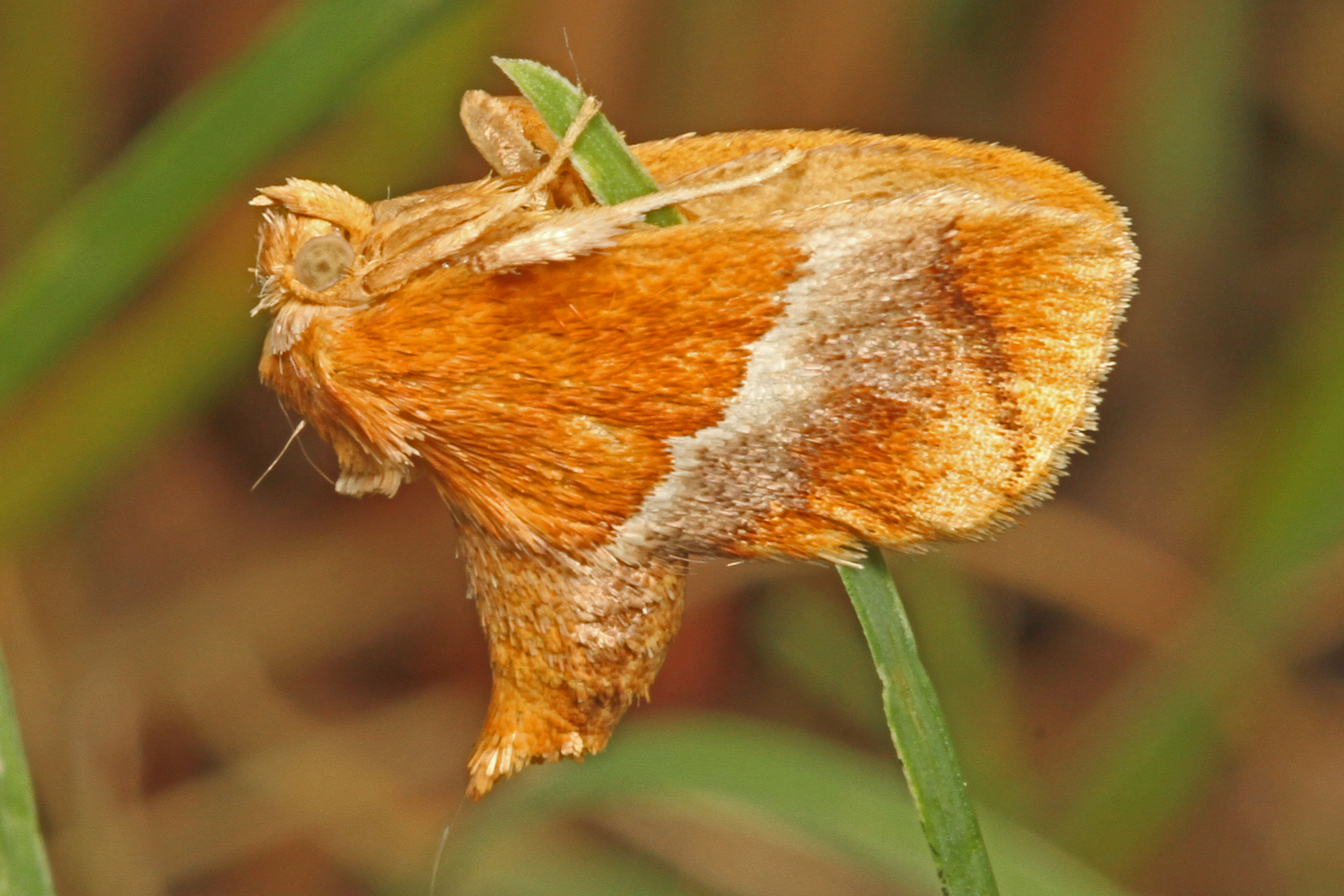
- Lithacodes gracea

Scientific classification
- Domain: Eukaryota
- Kingdom: Animalia
- Phylum: Arthropoda
- Class: Insecta
- Order: Lepidoptera
- Family: Limacodidae
- Genus: Lithacodes; Packard, 1864

= Lithacodes =

Genus of moths

Lithacodes is a genus of slug caterpillar moths in the family Limacodidae. There are about five described species in Lithacodes.

== Species ==
These five species belong to the genus Lithacodes:

- Lithacodes fasciola (Herrich-Schäffer, 1854)^{c g b} (yellow-shouldered slug moth)
- Lithacodes fiskeana Dyar, 1900^{c g}
- Lithacodes fiskeanus^{b} (Fisk's slug moth)
- Lithacodes gracea Dyar, 1921^{c g b} (graceful slug moth)
- Lithacodes graefii Packard, 1887^{c g}

Data sources: i = ITIS, c = Catalogue of Life, g = GBIF, b = Bugguide.net
