= Pseudonagoda naessigi =

Scientific classification
- Kingdom: Animalia
- Phylum: Arthropoda
- Clade: Pancrustacea
- Class: Insecta
- Order: Lepidoptera
- Family: Limacodidae
- Genus: Pseudonagoda
- Species: P. naessigi

Binomial name
- Pseudonagoda naessigi Holloway, 1990

Species of moth

Pseudonagoda naessigi is a species of moth of the family Limacodidae. It is found on Sumatra and Peninsular Malaysia.
