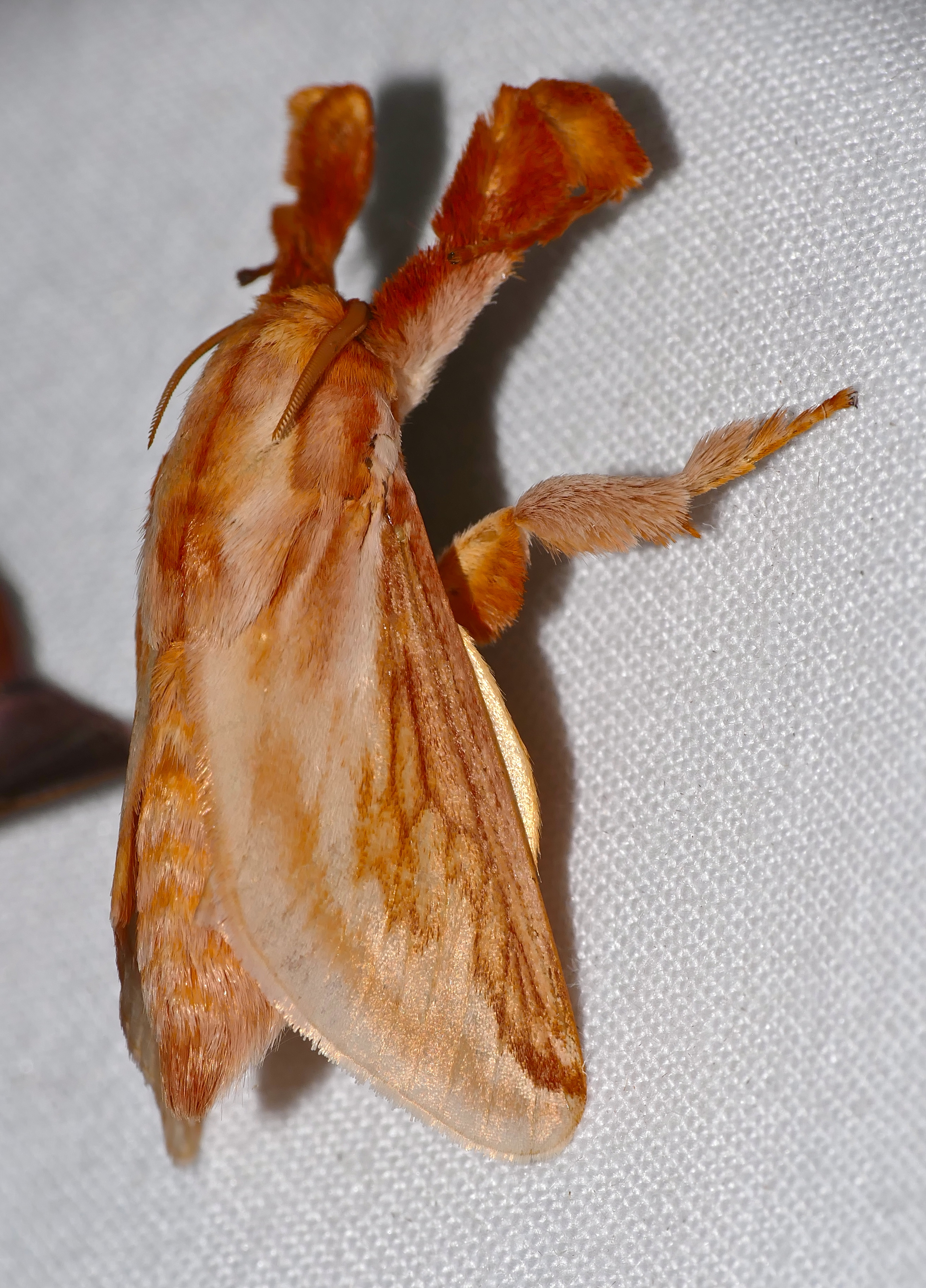

Scientific classification
- Kingdom: Animalia
- Phylum: Arthropoda
- Class: Insecta
- Order: Lepidoptera
- Family: Limacodidae
- Genus: Perola
- Species: P. villosipes

Binomial name
- Perola villosipes Walker, 1865

= Perola villosipes =

Species of moth

Perola villosipes is a species of slug moth found in South America. It was described by Francis Walker in 1865.
