= Austrapoda beijingensis =

Scientific classification
- Kingdom: Animalia
- Phylum: Arthropoda
- Clade: Pancrustacea
- Class: Insecta
- Order: Lepidoptera
- Family: Limacodidae
- Genus: Austrapoda
- Species: A. beijingensis

Binomial name
- Austrapoda beijingensis C.S. Wu, 2011

Species of moth

Austrapoda beijingensis is a species of moth of the family Limacodidae. It is found in China.
