= Atosioides =

Scientific classification
- Domain: Eukaryota
- Kingdom: Animalia
- Phylum: Arthropoda
- Class: Insecta
- Order: Lepidoptera
- Family: Limacodidae
- Genus: Atosioides; Solovyev, 2009

Genus of moths

Atosioides is a genus of moths of the family Limacodidae.

== Species ==
- Atosioides accola Solovyev, 2009
- Atosioides rochei (Holloway, 1986)
