= Pseudidonauton vexa =

Scientific classification
- Domain: Eukaryota
- Kingdom: Animalia
- Phylum: Arthropoda
- Class: Insecta
- Order: Lepidoptera
- Family: Limacodidae
- Genus: Pseudidonauton
- Species: P. vexa

Binomial name
- Pseudidonauton vexa Solovyev, 2009

Species of moth

Pseudidonauton vexa is a species of moth of the family Limacodidae. It is found in northern and central Vietnam and south-eastern Thailand at altitudes between 280 and 380 meters.

The length of the forewings is 6–7 mm for males and about 9 mm for females. Adults have been recorded in early August and from late September to early October.

== Etymology ==
The species name is derived from Latin vexo (meaning "disarrange").
