= Pseudidonauton nigribasis =

Scientific classification
- Kingdom: Animalia
- Phylum: Arthropoda
- Class: Insecta
- Order: Lepidoptera
- Family: Limacodidae
- Genus: Pseudidonauton
- Species: P. nigribasis

Binomial name
- Pseudidonauton nigribasis Hampson, 1905

Synonyms
- Idonauton nigribasis Hampson, 1905

Species of moth

Pseudidonauton nigribasis is a species of moth of the family Limacodidae. It is found in India.
