= Austrapoda =

Scientific classification
- Kingdom: Animalia
- Phylum: Arthropoda
- Class: Insecta
- Order: Lepidoptera
- Family: Limacodidae
- Genus: Austrapoda; Inoue, 1982

Genus of moths

Austrapoda is a genus of moths of the family Limacodidae.

== Species ==
- Austrapoda beijingensis C.S. Wu, 2011
- Austrapoda dentatus (Oberthür, 1879)
- Austrapoda hepatica Inoue, 1987
- Austrapoda seres Solovyev, 2009
