= Macroplectra ceylonica =

Scientific classification
- Kingdom: Animalia
- Phylum: Arthropoda
- Class: Insecta
- Order: Lepidoptera
- Family: Limacodidae
- Genus: Macroplectra
- Species: M. ceylonica

Binomial name
- Macroplectra ceylonica Hampson, 1906

Species of moth

Macroplectra ceylonica is a moth of the family Limacodidae first described by George Hampson in 1906. It is found in Sri Lanka.
