= Aphendala ferreogrisea =

Scientific classification
- Kingdom: Animalia
- Phylum: Arthropoda
- Class: Insecta
- Order: Lepidoptera
- Family: Limacodidae
- Genus: Aphendala
- Species: A. ferreogrisea

Binomial name
- Aphendala ferreogrisea Meyrick, 1913

Species of moth

Aphendala ferreogrisea is a moth of the family Limacodidae first described by Edward Meyrick in 1913. It is found in Sri Lanka, and Australia.

Forewings dark grayish brown. A dentate medial fasciae found in the forewing. A distinct discal spot present.
