= Andaingo (moth) =

Scientific classification
- Kingdom: Animalia
- Phylum: Arthropoda
- Class: Insecta
- Order: Lepidoptera
- Family: Limacodidae
- Genus: Andaingo; Viette, 1980

Genus of moths

Andaingo is a genus of moths in the family Limacodidae.

== Species ==
Species include:

- Andaingo bicolor, found in Equatorial Guinea
- Andaingo ecclesiastica, type species, found in Madagascar Synonym: Macrosemyra ecclesiastica.
- Andaingo melampepla
- Andaingo rufivena, found in Cameroon
