= Euphlyctinides laika =

Scientific classification
- Kingdom: Animalia
- Phylum: Arthropoda
- Clade: Pancrustacea
- Class: Insecta
- Order: Lepidoptera
- Family: Limacodidae
- Genus: Euphlyctinides
- Species: E. laika

Binomial name
- Euphlyctinides laika Solovyev & Witt, 2009

Species of moth

Euphlyctinides laika is a species of moth of the family Limacodidae. It is found in Vietnam.
