= Atosioides rochei =

Scientific classification
- Kingdom: Animalia
- Phylum: Arthropoda
- Clade: Pancrustacea
- Class: Insecta
- Order: Lepidoptera
- Family: Limacodidae
- Genus: Atosioides
- Species: A. rochei

Binomial name
- Atosioides rochei (Holloway, 1986)

Synonyms
- Atosia rochei Holloway, 1986

Species of moth

Atosioides rochei is a species of moth of the family Limacodidae. It is found on Borneo, Sumatra and Peninsular Malaysia.

The length of the forewings is about 11 mm.
