= Strigivenifera livingstonei =

Scientific classification
- Kingdom: Animalia
- Phylum: Arthropoda
- Clade: Pancrustacea
- Class: Insecta
- Order: Lepidoptera
- Family: Limacodidae
- Genus: Strigivenifera
- Species: S. livingstonei

Binomial name
- Strigivenifera livingstonei Kurshakov & Zolotuhin, 2013

Synonyms
- Chrysopoloma albidiscalis Hampson, 1910 (original combination); Strigivenifera albidiscalis (Hampson, 1910); Strigivenifera cruisa Kurshakov & Zolotuhin, 2013

Species of moth

Strigivenifera livingstonei is a species of slug moth described by Kurshakov & Zolotuhin in 2013.
