= Euphlyctinides =

Scientific classification
- Domain: Eukaryota
- Kingdom: Animalia
- Phylum: Arthropoda
- Class: Insecta
- Order: Lepidoptera
- Family: Limacodidae
- Genus: Euphlyctinides; Hering, 1931

Genus of moths

Euphlyctinides is a genus of moths of the family Limacodidae.

== Species ==
- Euphlyctinides aeneola Solovyev, 2009
- Euphlyctinides albifusum (Hampson, 1892)
- Euphlyctinides indi Solovyev, 2009
- Euphlyctinides laika Solovyev & Witt, 2009
