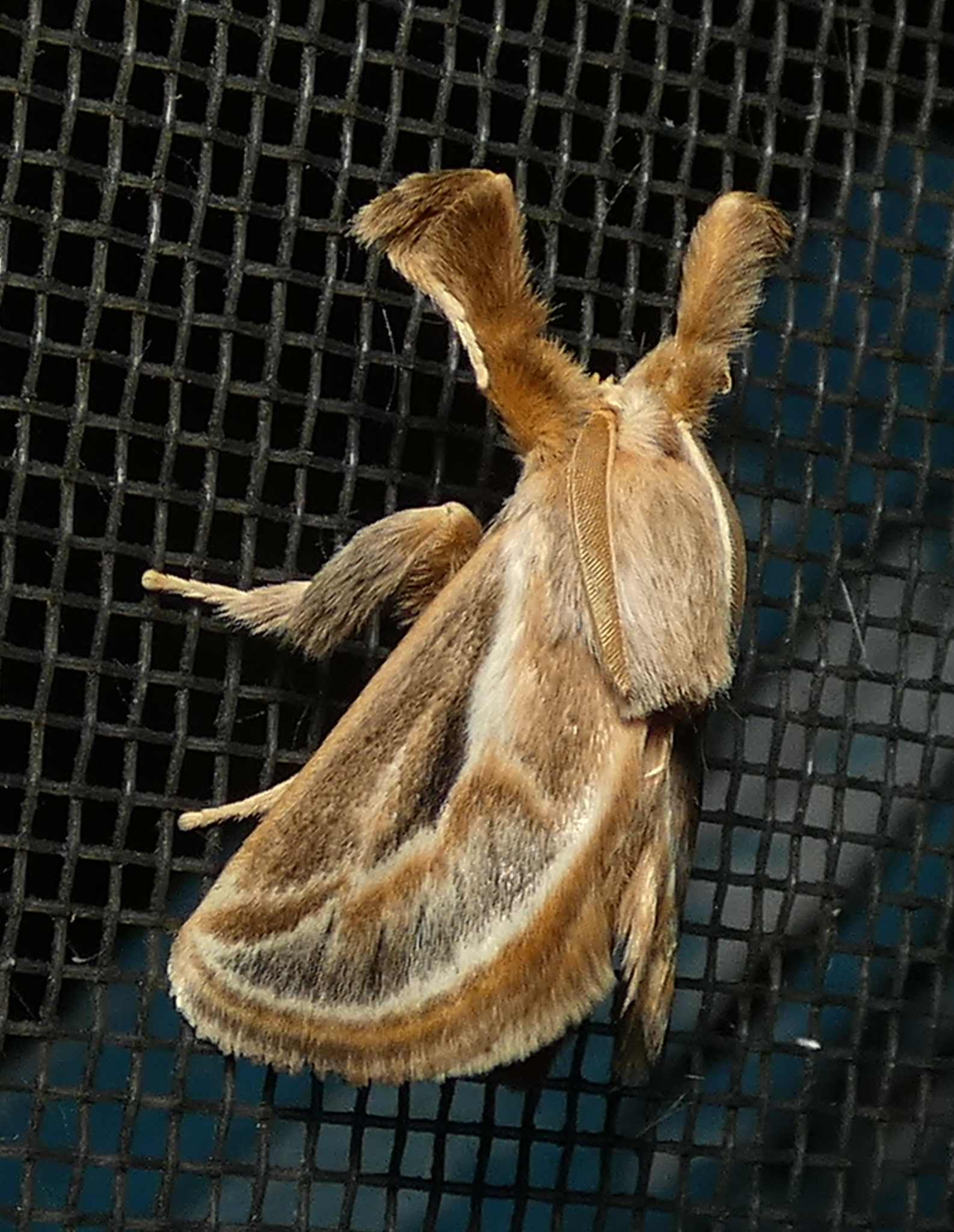

Scientific classification
- Kingdom: Animalia
- Phylum: Arthropoda
- Class: Insecta
- Order: Lepidoptera
- Family: Limacodidae
- Genus: Perola
- Species: P. brumalis

Binomial name
- Perola brumalis (Schaus, 1892)

Synonyms
- Trabala brumalis

= Perola brumalis =

Species of moth

Perola brumalis is a species of slug moth found in South America. It was described by William Schaus in 1892.
