= Pseudidonauton siamica =

Scientific classification
- Domain: Eukaryota
- Kingdom: Animalia
- Phylum: Arthropoda
- Class: Insecta
- Order: Lepidoptera
- Family: Limacodidae
- Genus: Pseudidonauton
- Species: P. siamica

Binomial name
- Pseudidonauton siamica Solovyev, 2009

Species of moth

Pseudidonauton siamica is a species of moth of the family Limacodidae. It is found in northern Thailand and central Vietnam at altitudes between 119 and 2,300 meters.

The wingspan is 14–15 mm.
