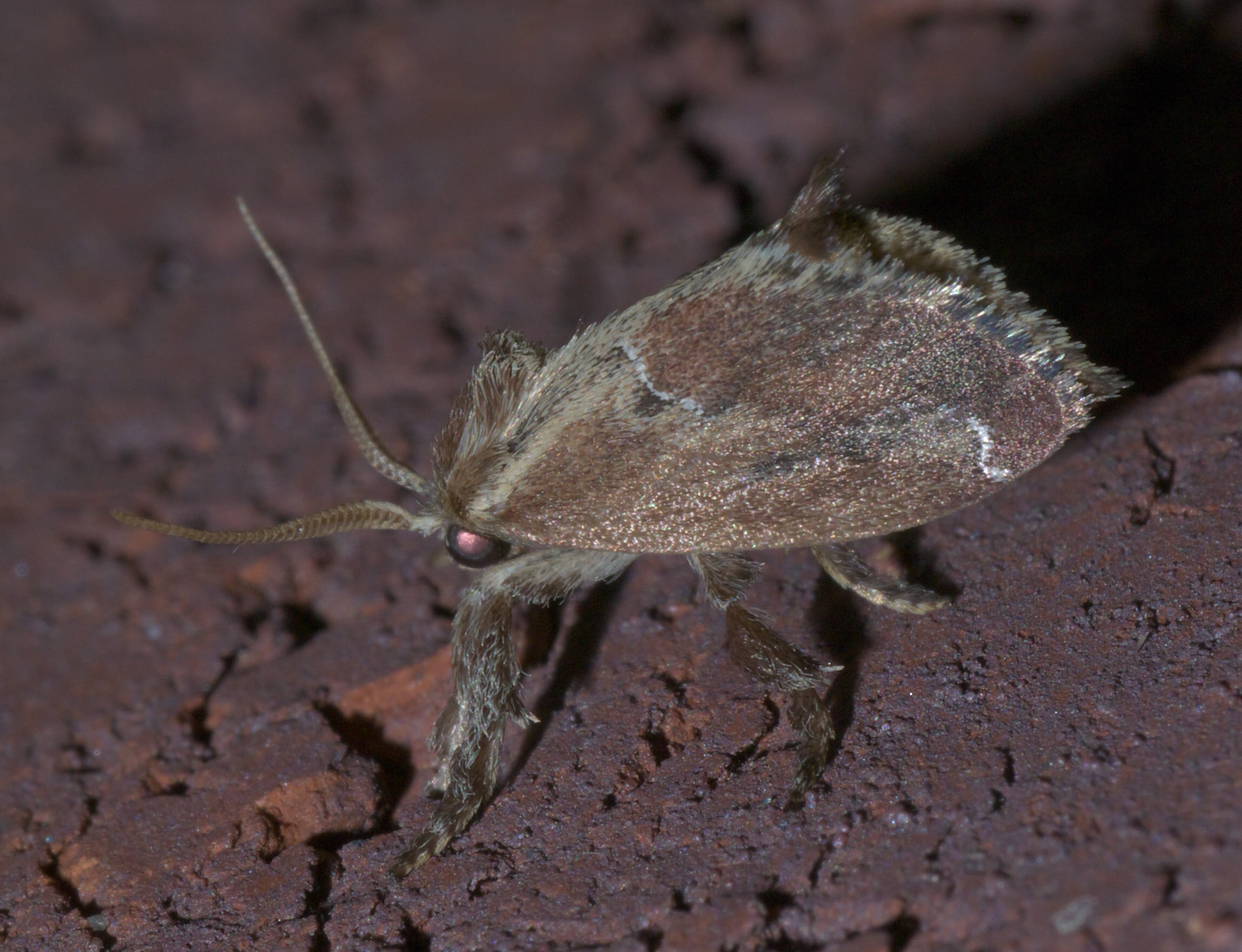

Scientific classification
- Domain: Eukaryota
- Kingdom: Animalia
- Phylum: Arthropoda
- Class: Insecta
- Order: Lepidoptera
- Family: Limacodidae
- Genus: Adoneta
- Species: A. spinuloides

Binomial name
- Adoneta spinuloides (H. -s., 1854)

= Adoneta spinuloides =

Species of moth

Adoneta spinuloides, the purple-crested slug moth, is a species of slug caterpillar moth in the family Limacodidae.

The MONA or Hodges number for Adoneta spinuloides is 4685.

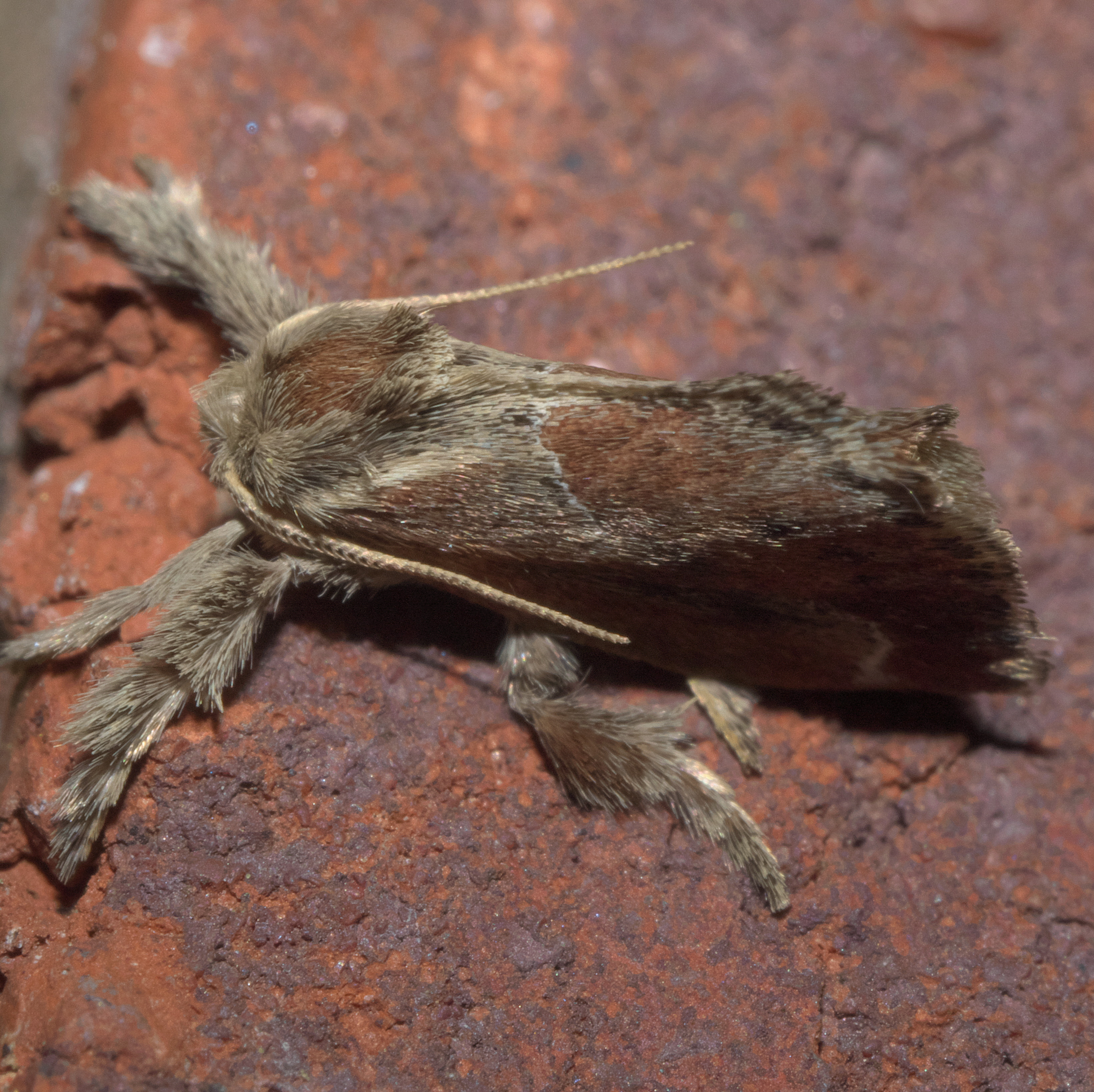
Purple-crested slug moth, Adoneta spinuloides
