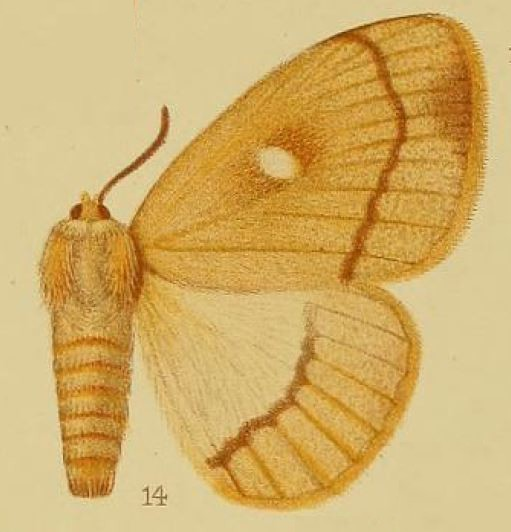

Scientific classification
- Kingdom: Animalia
- Phylum: Arthropoda
- Clade: Pancrustacea
- Class: Insecta
- Order: Lepidoptera
- Family: Limacodidae
- Genus: Strigivenifera
- Species: S. albidiscalis

Binomial name
- Strigivenifera albidiscalis (Hampson, 1910)

Synonyms
- Chrysopoloma albidiscalis Hampson, 1910 (original combination); Strigivenifera cruisa Kurshakov & Zolotuhin, 2013; Strigivenifera livingstonei Kurshakov & Zolotuhin, 2013

= Strigivenifera albidiscalis =

Species of moth

Strigivenifera albidiscalis is a species of slug moth described by George Hampson in 1910.
