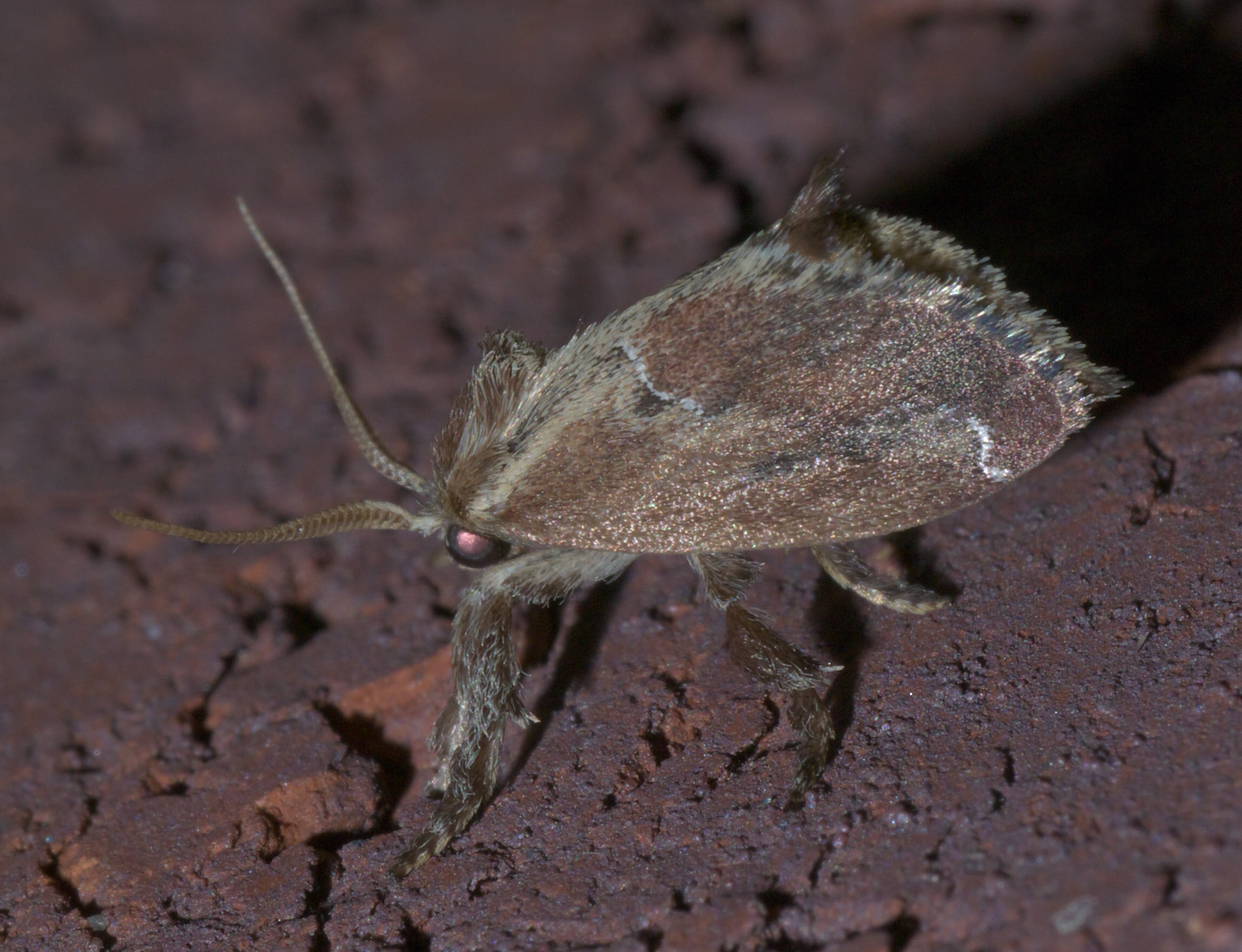
- Adoneta spinuloides

Scientific classification
- Kingdom: Animalia
- Phylum: Arthropoda
- Class: Insecta
- Order: Lepidoptera
- Family: Limacodidae
- Genus: Adoneta; Clemens, 1860

Synonyms
- Cyclopteryx Packard, 1864

= Adoneta =

Genus of moths

Adoneta is a genus of moths in the family Limacodidae. The genus was erected by James Brackenridge Clemens in 1860. There are at least four described species in Adoneta.

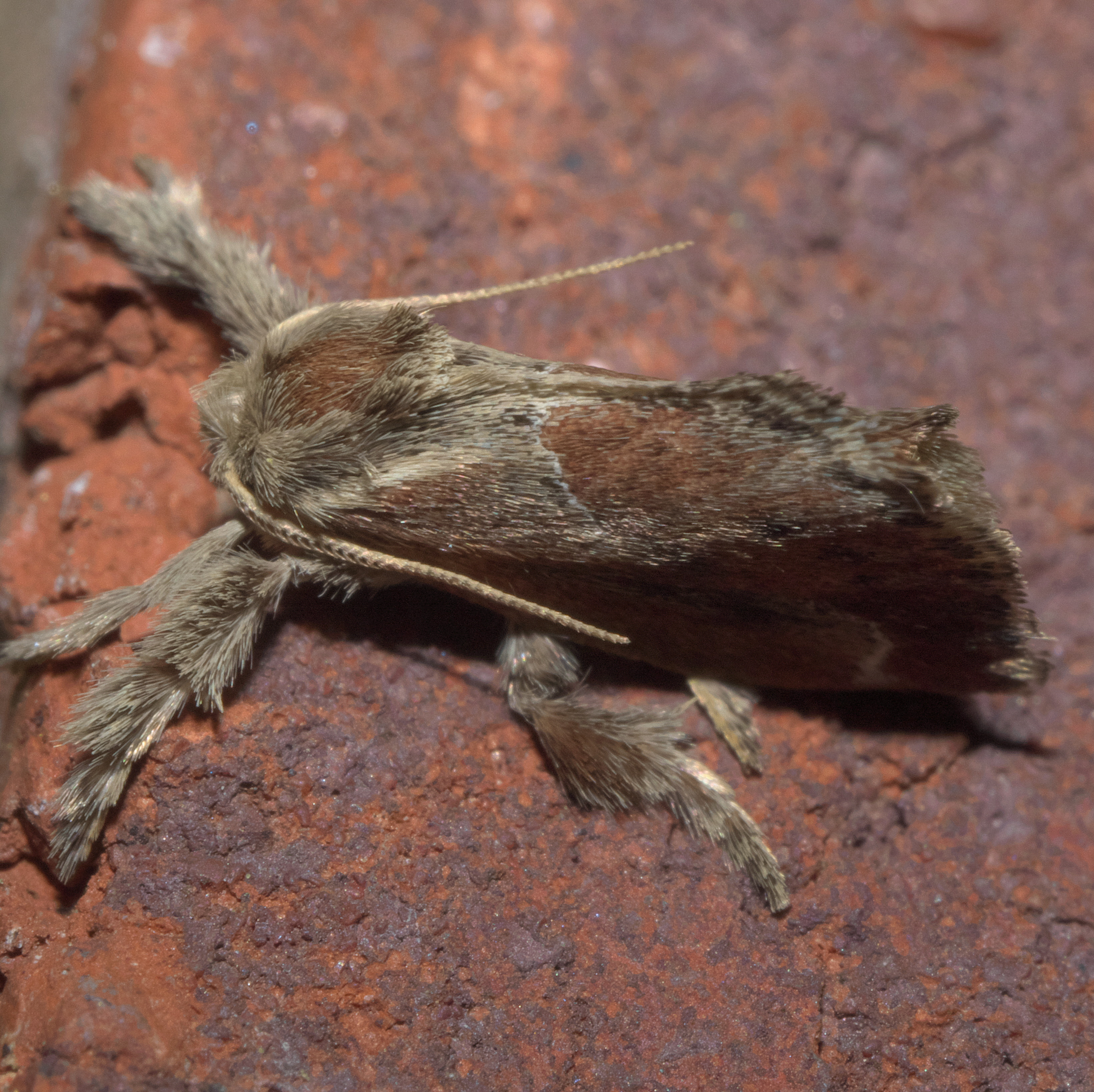
Adoneta spinuloides

== Species ==
- Adoneta bicaudata Dyar, 1904 (long-horned slug moth)
- Adoneta gemina Dyar, 1906
- Adoneta pygmaea Grote & Robinson, 1868
- Adoneta spinuloides (Herrich-Schäffer, 1854) (purple-crested slug moth)
