= Strigivenifera bartschi =

Scientific classification
- Kingdom: Animalia
- Phylum: Arthropoda
- Clade: Pancrustacea
- Class: Insecta
- Order: Lepidoptera
- Family: Limacodidae
- Genus: Strigivenifera
- Species: S. bartschi

Binomial name
- Strigivenifera bartschi Kurshakov & Zolotuhin, 2013

Species of insect

Strigivenifera bartschi is a species of moths in the genus Strigivenifera. It is in the family Limacodidae.

== Distribution ==
Strigivenifera bartschi occurs in Kenya and Uganda.
