= Pseudonagoda siniaevi =

Scientific classification
- Domain: Eukaryota
- Kingdom: Animalia
- Phylum: Arthropoda
- Class: Insecta
- Order: Lepidoptera
- Family: Limacodidae
- Genus: Pseudonagoda
- Species: P. siniaevi

Binomial name
- Pseudonagoda siniaevi Solovyev, 2009

Species of moth

Pseudonagoda siniaevi is a species of moth of the family Limacodidae. It is found in India (southern Andamans).

The wingspan is about 27 mm. Adults have been recorded in early March.

== Etymology ==
The species is named for Mr. Viktor V. Siniaev.
