= Euphlyctinides albifusum =

Scientific classification
- Kingdom: Animalia
- Phylum: Arthropoda
- Class: Insecta
- Order: Lepidoptera
- Family: Limacodidae
- Genus: Euphlyctinides
- Species: E. albifusum

Binomial name
- Euphlyctinides albifusum (Hampson, 1892)

Synonyms
- Ceratonema albifusum Hampson, 1892; Euphlyctinides rava Hering, 1931

Species of moth

Euphlyctinides albifusum is a species of moth of the family Limacodidae. It is found in India and Nepal.
