= Amydona =

Amydona may refer to:

- Amydona Walker, 1855, a genus of butterflies in the family Limacodidae, synonym of Perola
- Amydona Walker, 1855, a genus of butterflies in the family Lasiocampidae, synonym of Trabala
