= Pseudidonauton bhaga =

Scientific classification
- Domain: Eukaryota
- Kingdom: Animalia
- Phylum: Arthropoda
- Class: Insecta
- Order: Lepidoptera
- Family: Limacodidae
- Genus: Pseudidonauton
- Species: P. bhaga

Binomial name
- Pseudidonauton bhaga (C. Swinhoe, 1901)

Synonyms
- Thosea bhaga C. Swinhoe, 1901

Species of moth

Pseudidonauton bhaga is a species of moth of the family Limacodidae. It is found on Borneo, Peninsular Malaysia and Sumatra.
