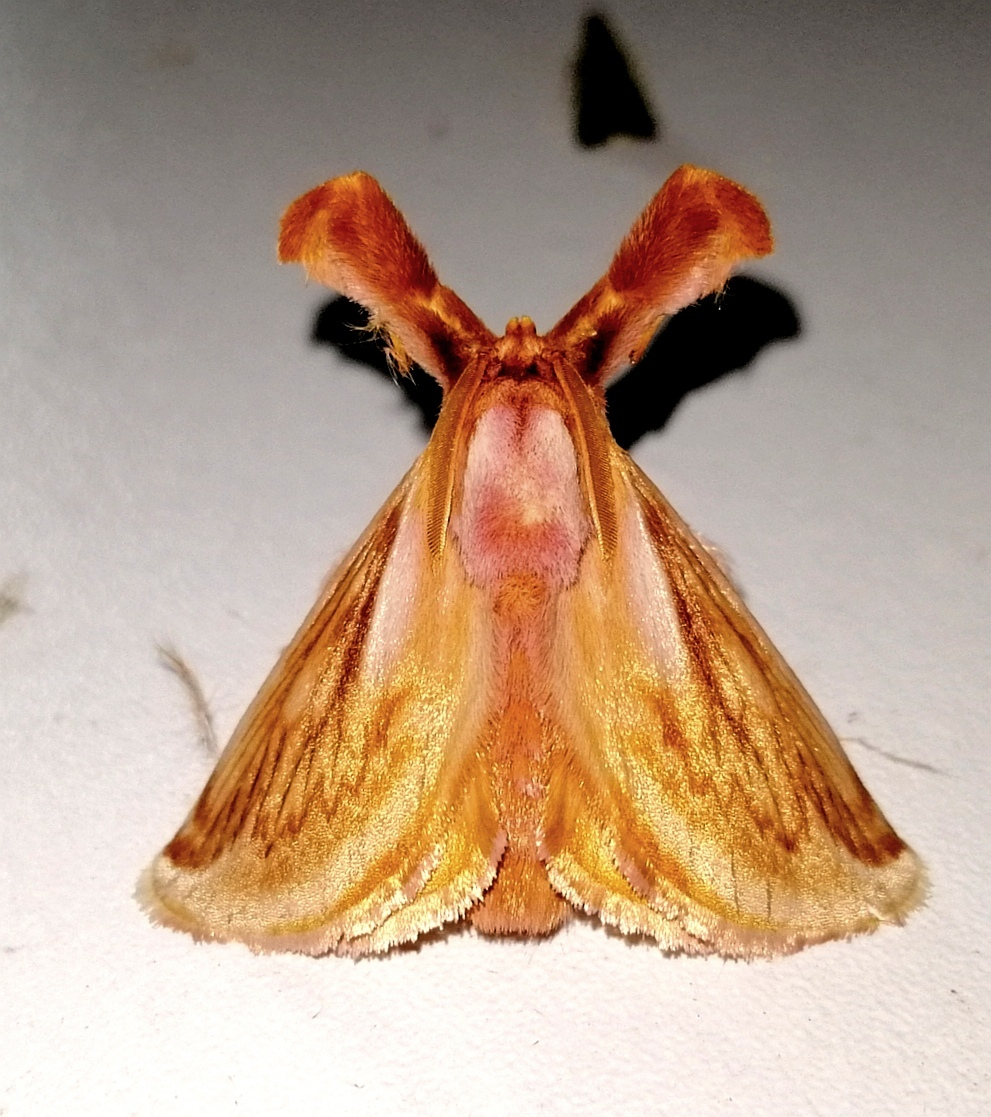
- Perola villosipes

Scientific classification
- Kingdom: Animalia
- Phylum: Arthropoda
- Class: Insecta
- Order: Lepidoptera
- Family: Limacodidae
- Genus: Perola; Walker, 1855

= Perola (moth) =

Genus of moths

Perola is a genus of slug moths described by Francis Walker in 1855.

== List of species ==
- Perola actiosa Dyar, 1926
- Perola affinis Dyar, 1906
- Perola aspera Dognin
- Perola benedocta Dyar, 1926
- Perola bistrigata Hampson, 1898
- Perola brevicornis Dyar, 1912
- Perola brumalis Schaus, 1892
- Perola brunnescens Hering, 1928
- Perola burchelli Dyar, 1906
- Perola cardinalli West, 1940
- Perola chica Jones, 1912
- Perola cicur Schaus, 1892
- Perola cilipes Walker, 1855
- Perola clara Dyar, 1907
- Perola cuneata Strand, 1911
- Perola danetta Dyar, 1926
- Perola degenerans Dyar, 1926
- Perola druceioides Dognin, 1894
- Perola ignorata Hering, 1928
- Perola invaria Walker, 1855
- Perola jorgenseni Schaus, 1921
- Perola laopepe Dyar, 1926
- Perola monomania Dyar, 1915
- Perola murina Walker, 1855
- Perola nitidissima Dognin, 1916
- Perola paraguaicula Dyar, 1916
- Perola parallela Dyar, 1906
- Perola penumbra Dyar, 1906
- Perola petropolis Dyar, 1906
- Perola platona Schaus, 1896
- Perola producta Dyar, 1912
- Perola propepunctata Bryk
- Perola prosper Dyar, 1927
- Perola punctata Walker, 1955
- Perola regina Dyar, 1926
- Perola repetita Druce, 1900
- Perola rubens Schaus, 1894
- Perola secunda Strand, 1912
- Perola sericea Möschler, 1878
- Perola sibillanta Dyar, 1926
- Perola sinaloensis Schaus, 1920
- Perola solaria Dognin, 1916
- Perola subpunctata Walker, 1855
- Perola subpunctella Dyar, 1927
- Perola sucia Schaus, 1896
- Perola sudanensis Hering, 1928
- Perola umber Dyar, 1906
- Perola villosipes Walker, 1865
