= Aphendala recta =

Scientific classification
- Kingdom: Animalia
- Phylum: Arthropoda
- Class: Insecta
- Order: Lepidoptera
- Family: Limacodidae
- Genus: Aphendala
- Species: A. recta

Binomial name
- Aphendala recta Hampson, 1893

Synonyms
- Thosea recta (Hampson, 1893)

Species of moth

Aphendala recta is a moth of the family Limacodidae first described by George Hampson in 1893. It is found in Sri Lanka.

Forewings grayish brown with indistinct external fasciae. A pale ovoid shading near the outer margin of forewing. There is a distinct white distal border of the medial fascia. Larval food plant is Camellia sinensis.
