= Austrapoda dentatus =

Scientific classification
- Domain: Eukaryota
- Kingdom: Animalia
- Phylum: Arthropoda
- Class: Insecta
- Order: Lepidoptera
- Family: Limacodidae
- Genus: Austrapoda
- Species: A. dentatus

Binomial name
- Austrapoda dentatus (Oberthür, 1879)

Synonyms
- Limacodes dentata Oberthür, 1879; Austrapoda dentata; Thosea nitobeana Matsumura, 1931

Species of moth

Austrapoda hepatica is a species of moth of the family Limacodidae. It is found in the Russian Far East (south-east Siberia), Japan (Hokkaido, Honshu, Shikoku, Kyushu) and Korea.

The wingspan is 25–30 mm.
