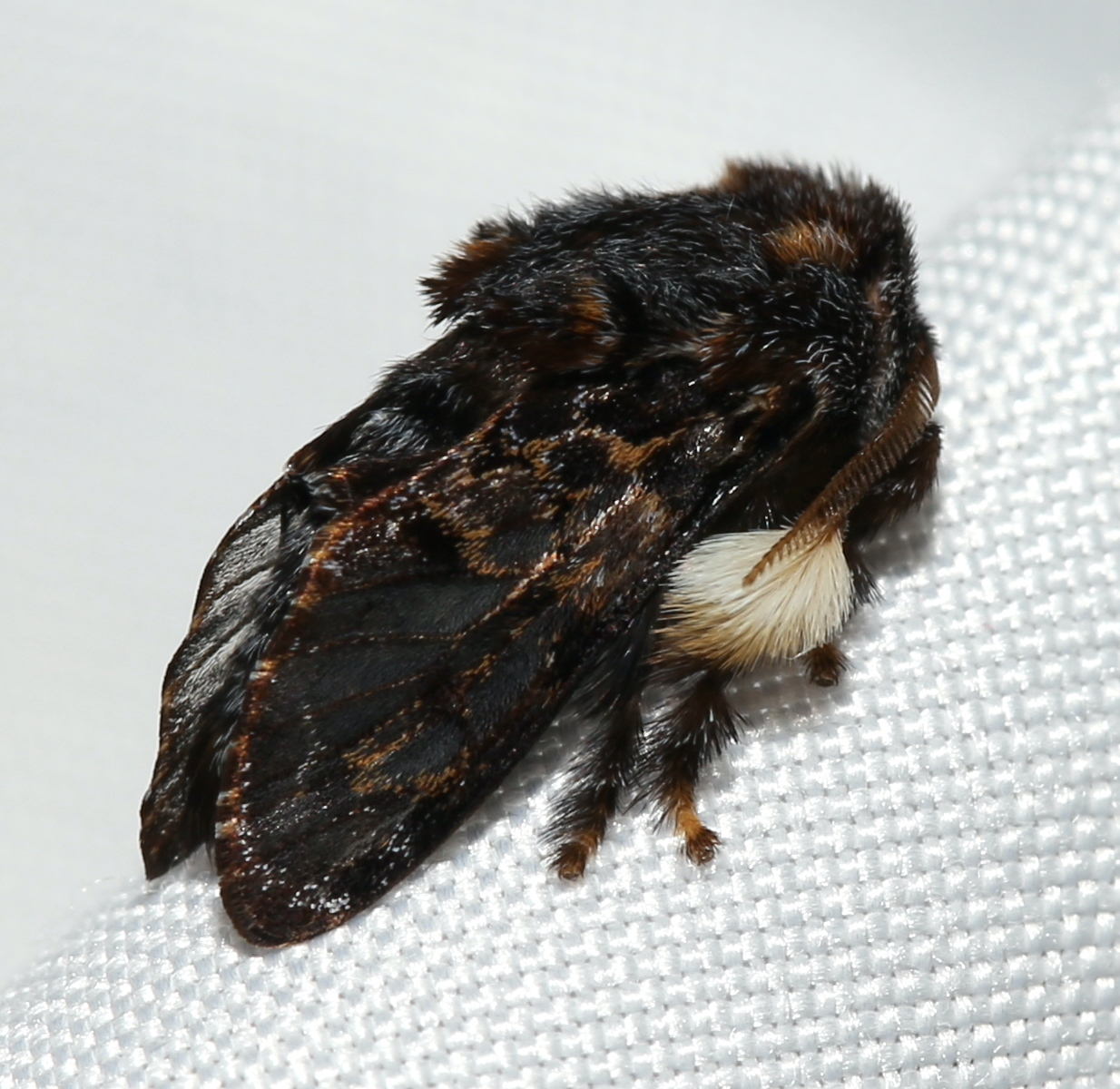

Scientific classification
- Kingdom: Animalia
- Phylum: Arthropoda
- Clade: Pancrustacea
- Class: Insecta
- Order: Lepidoptera
- Family: Limacodidae
- Genus: Phobetron
- Species: P. pithecium

Binomial name
- Phobetron pithecium (JE Smith, 1797)

= Phobetron pithecium =

Species of moth

Phobetron pithecium, the hag moth, is a moth of the family Limacodidae. Its larva is known as the monkey slug.

== Life cycle ==
One generation a year occurs in the north, but two or more happen in the southern United States.

=== Larva ===
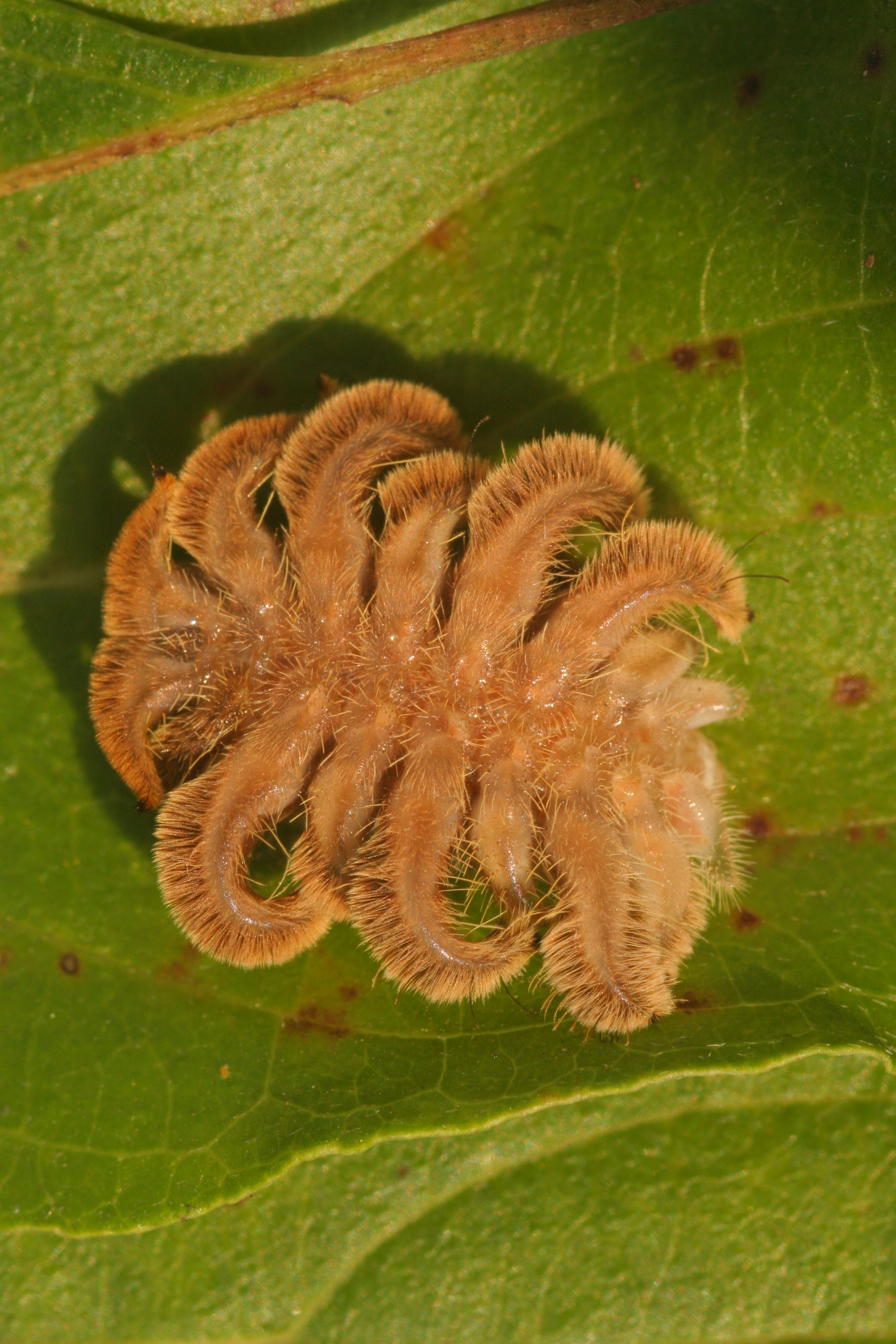
Larva, Michigan, mid-August

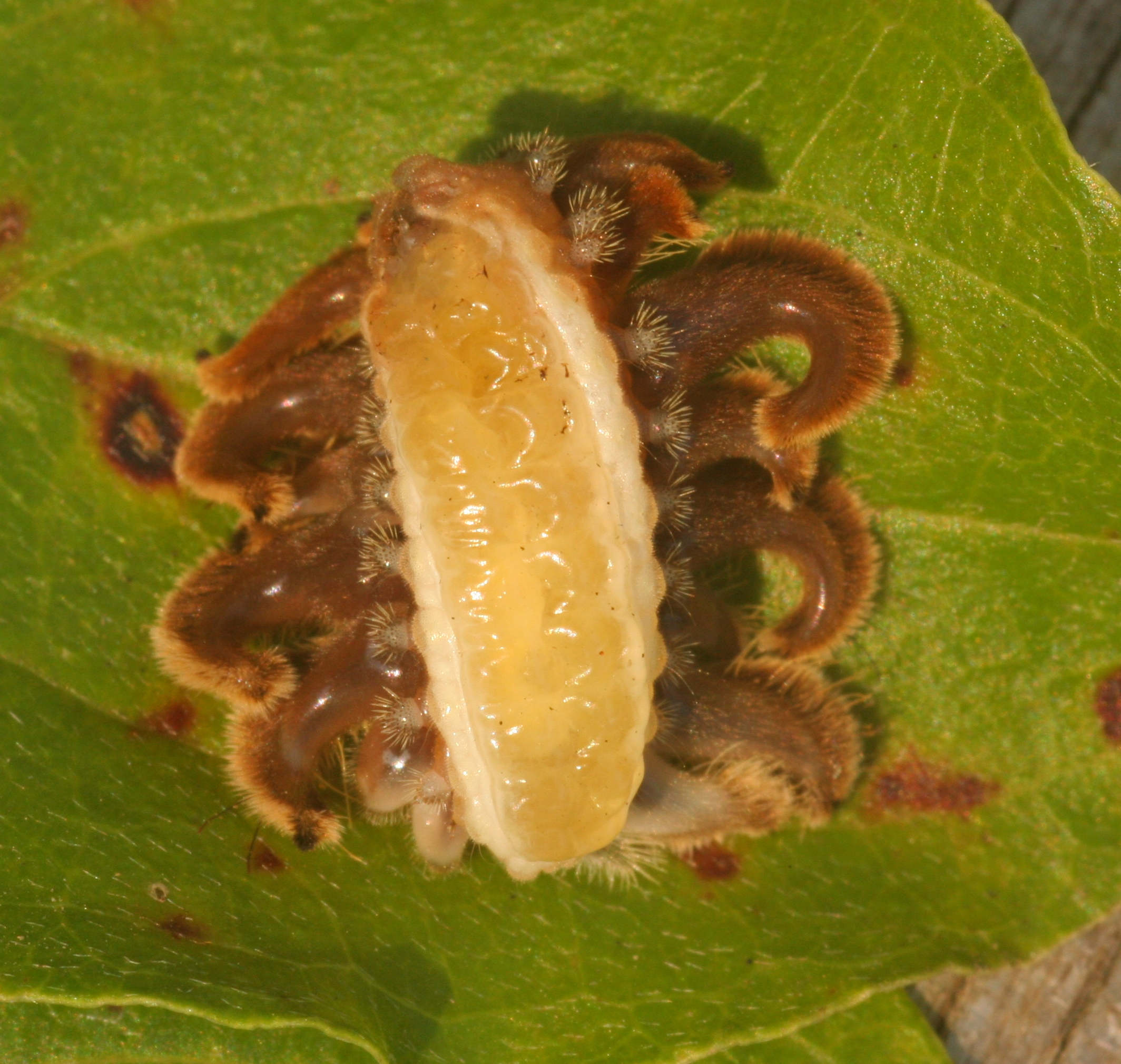
Underside of larva, showing reduced legs

The larva is distinctive, with no close analogues, although it may be mistaken for the shed skin of a hairy spider or leaf debris. It has nine pairs of curly projections or tubercles of varying lengths from the flattened body, each densely covered in hairs. The third, fifth and seventh projection are often longer than the others. The caterpillar has been reported to cause irritation to humans. Like all limacodids, the legs are shortened and the prolegs are reduced to suction cups. The "arms" or tubercles can fall off without harming the caterpillar, aiding the larva in defense. The larvae are 1.5–2.5 centimetres (0.59–0.98 in) in length.

It is solitary and is not a very significant agricultural threat, but it is a common sight in orchards.

=== Pupa ===
This species pupates in a cup-shaped cocoon with a circular escape hatch.

=== Adult ===
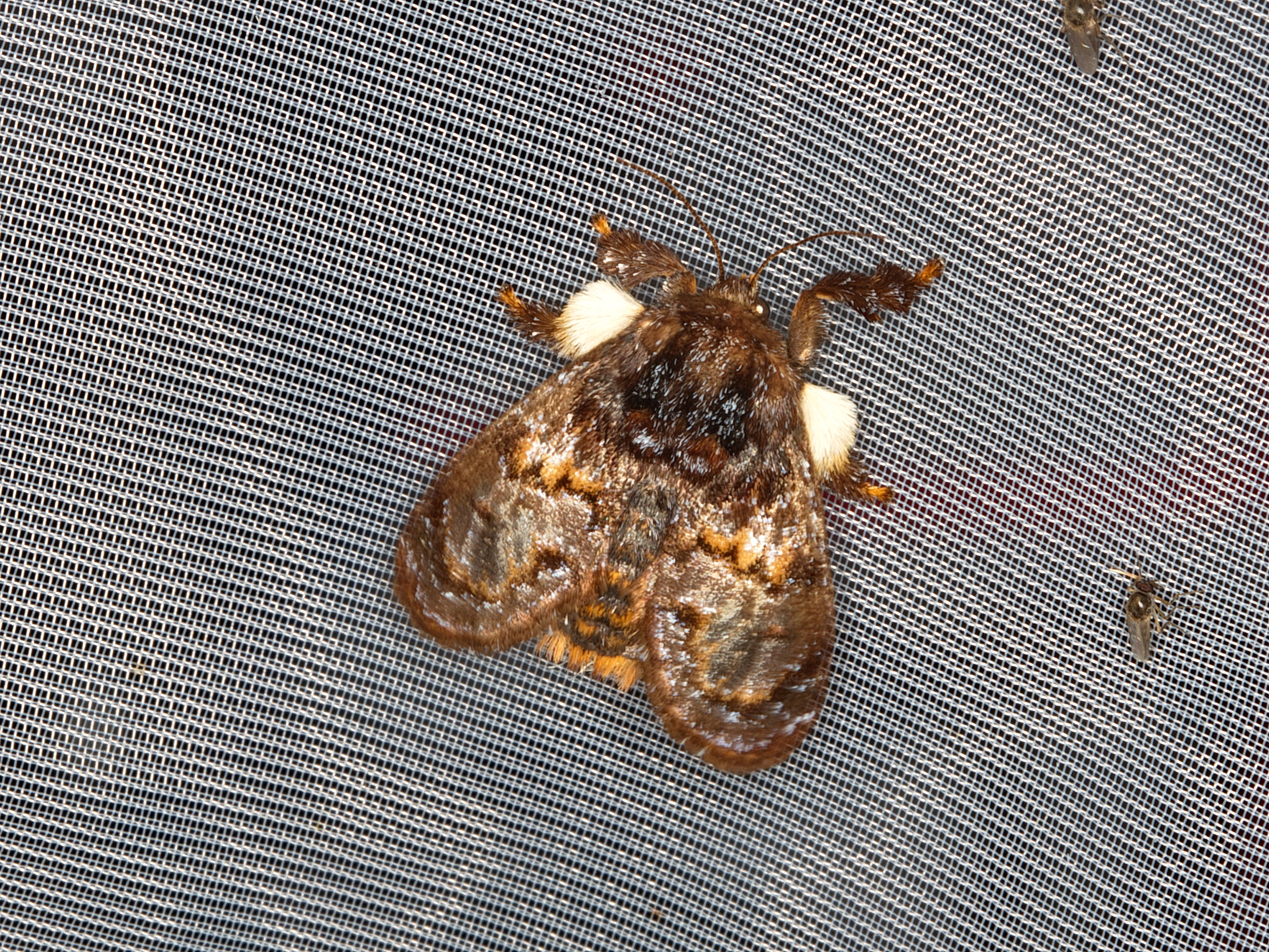
Adult hag moth in Florida

The adult moth has a wingspan up to 3 centimetres (1.2 in). The male has translucent wings, and the female is drab brown and gray, with yellow scales on her legs. The day-flying female is said to mimic a bee, complete with pollen sacs, and the male mimics a wasp.

== Food plants ==
Larvae live on the underside of the leaves of, and feeds on, a variety of deciduous trees and shrubs, such as apple, ash, birch, cherry, chestnut, dogwood, hickory, oak, persimmon, walnut, and willow.
