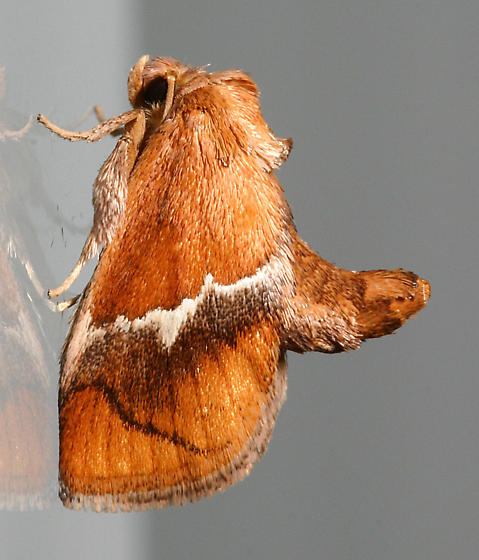

Scientific classification
- Domain: Eukaryota
- Kingdom: Animalia
- Phylum: Arthropoda
- Class: Insecta
- Order: Lepidoptera
- Family: Limacodidae
- Genus: Lithacodes
- Species: L. fasciola

Binomial name
- Lithacodes fasciola ((Herrich-Schäffer 1854) )

= Lithacodes fasciola =

Species of moth

Lithacodes fasciola, the yellow-shouldered slug or ochre-winged hag moth, is a moth of the family Limacodidae.

== Lifecycle ==
One generation a year occurs in the north, but two or more in the southern United States, so mature caterpillars may be found from May to November.

=== Larva ===
The larva is flattened and ovoid in outline, with a short, squared off "tail". It is a bright yellow green with yellow and green stripes along its length. Small craters dot its topside. Maximum length is 15 mm. Like all limacodids, the legs are shortened and the prolegs are reduced to suction cups. A high proportion of larvae have parasitoids. Their presence can be determined before emergence by a black spot formed by the breathing siphon of the fly.

=== Pupa ===
This species pupates in a cup-shaped cocoon with a circular escape hatch.

=== Adult ===
The small (1 cm) moth is "hairy" and brown, with a white stripe bordered in black across the fore wings, black spots, and a black crescent. The under wing is a paler grey brown.

== Food plants ==
This moth eats a variety of deciduous trees and shrubs, such as apple, beech, birch, blueberry, cherry, chestnut, hickory, honey locust, hornbeam, linden, maple, oak, and willow.

=== Gallery ===
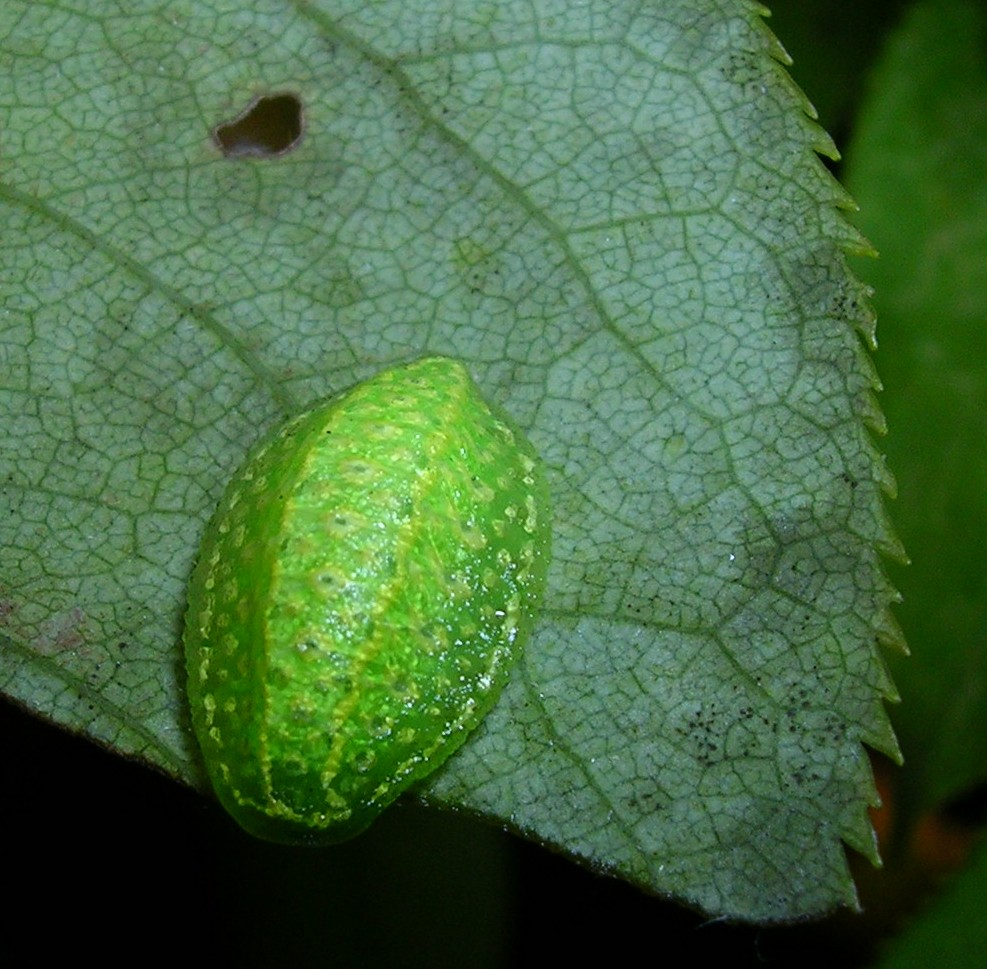
Larva, Delton, Michigan

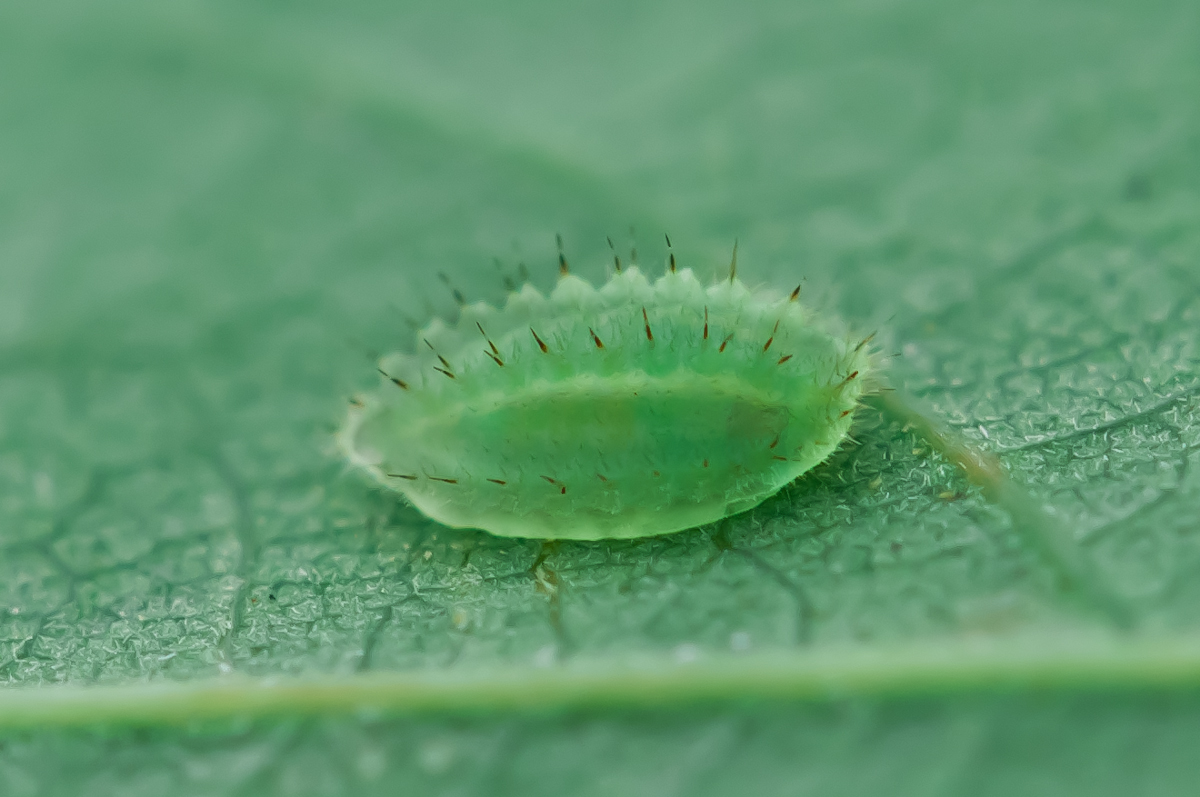
Larva

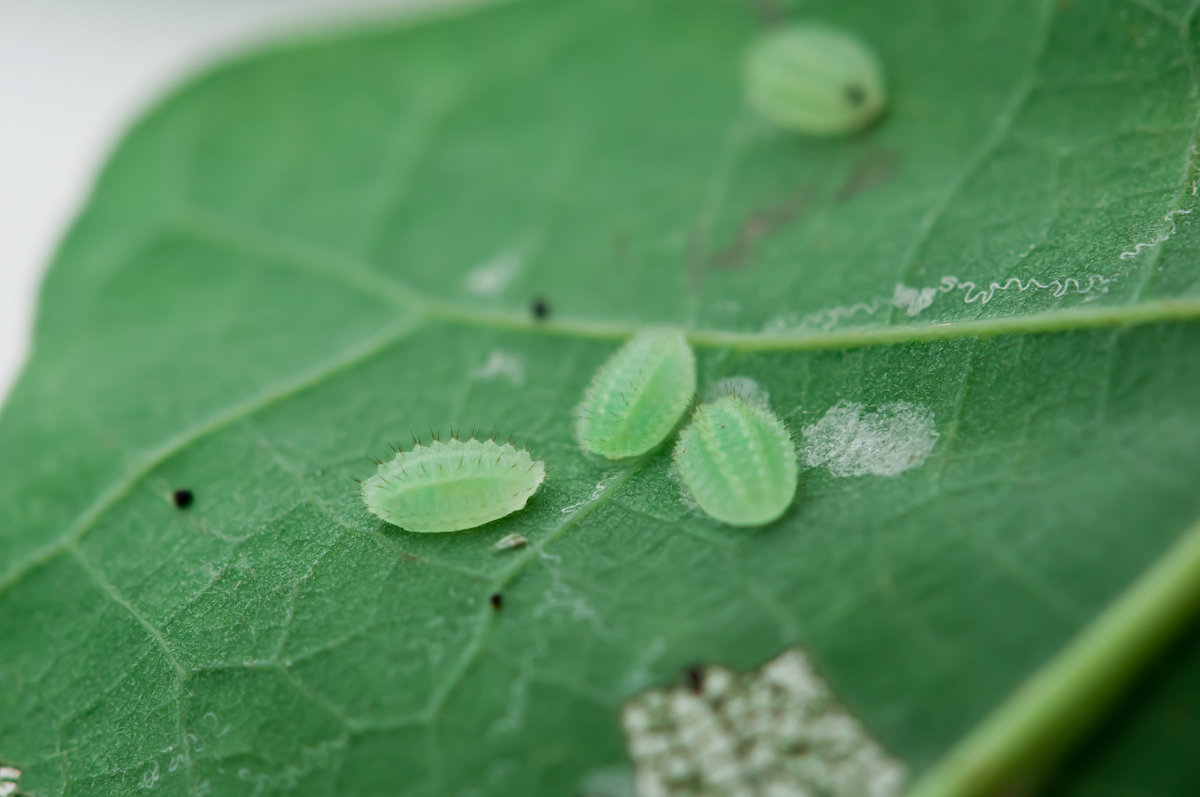
Larvae in a research facility, Washington, DC
