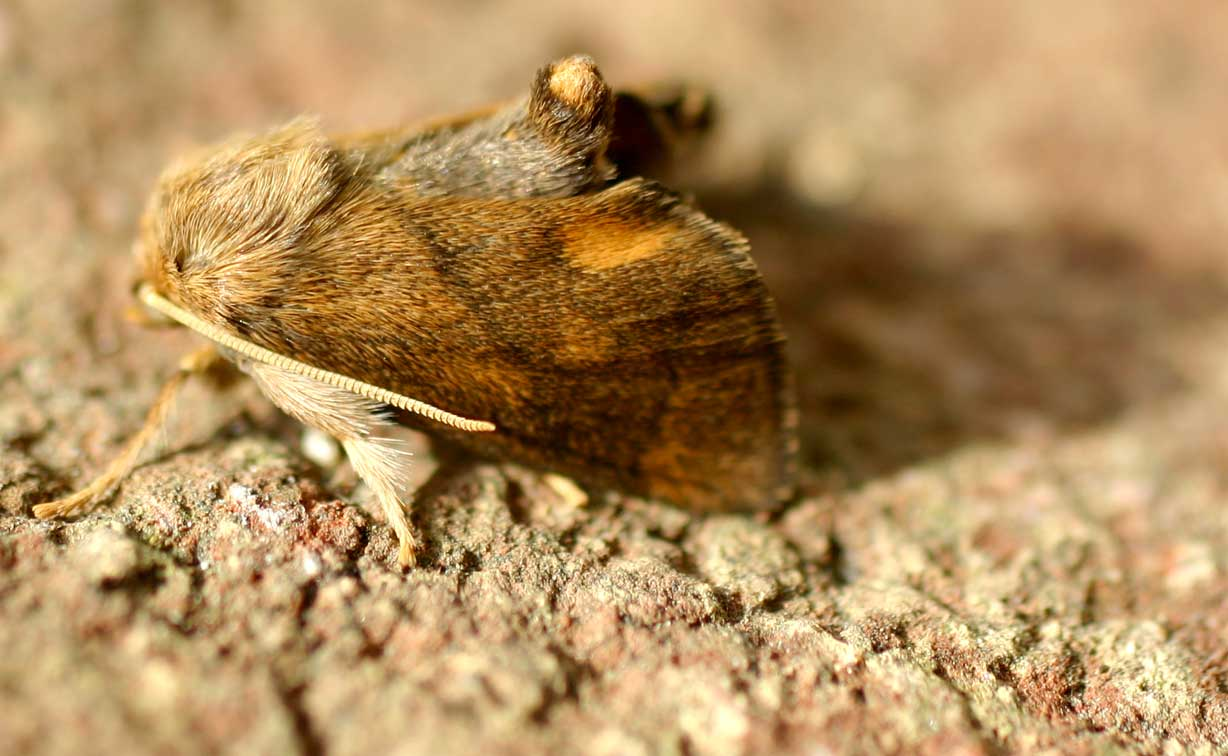
- The festoon, Apoda limacodes

Scientific classification
- Domain: Eukaryota
- Kingdom: Animalia
- Phylum: Arthropoda
- Class: Insecta
- Order: Lepidoptera
- Superfamily: Zygaenoidea
- Family: Limacodidae

Subfamilies
- Chrysopolominae; Limacodinae; For full list of genera, see Taxonomy of Limacodidae.

Diversity
- About 400 genera, 1800 species

Synonyms
- Euclidae; Apodidae Paclt, 1947

= Limacodidae =

Family of moths

The Limacodidae or Eucleidae are a family of moths in the superfamily Zygaenoidea or the Cossoidea; the placement is in dispute. They are often called slug moths because their caterpillars bear a distinct resemblance to slugs. They are also called cup moths because of the shape of their cocoons.

The larvae are often liberally covered in protective stinging hairs, and are mostly tropical, but occur worldwide, with about 1800 described species and probably many more as yet undescribed species.

== Description ==
=== Moths ===
They are small, hairy moths, with reduced or absent mouthparts and fringed wings. They often perch with their abdomens sticking out at 90° from their thoraces and wings. North American moths are mostly cryptic browns, sometimes marked with white or green, but the hag moth mimics bees.

=== Pupae ===
The final instar constructs a silk cocoon and hardens it with calcium oxalate excreted from its Malpighian tubules. Cocoons have a circular escape hatch, formed from a line of weakness in the silk matrix. It is forced open just prior to emergence of the adult.

=== Caterpillars ===
The larvae are typically very flattened, and instead of prolegs, they have suckers. The thoracic legs are reduced, but always present, and they move by rolling waves rather than walking with individual prolegs. They even use a lubricant, a kind of liquefied silk, to move.

Larvae might be confused with the similarly flattened larvae of lycaenid butterflies, but those caterpillars have prolegs, are always longer than they are wide, and are always densely covered in short or long setae (hair-like bristles). The head is extended during feeding in the lycaenids, but remains covered in the Limacodidae.

Many limacodid larvae are green and fairly smooth (e.g. yellow-shouldered slug), but others have tubercles with urticating hairs and may have bright warning colours. The sting can be quite potent, causing severe pain.

The larval head is concealed under folds. First-instars skeletonise the leaf (avoiding small veins and eating mostly one surface), but later instars eat the whole leaf, usually from the underside. Many species seem to feed on several genera of host plants.

Limacodidae larvae in temperate forests of eastern North America prefer glabrous leaves, presumably because the trichomes of pubescent leaves interfere with their movement.

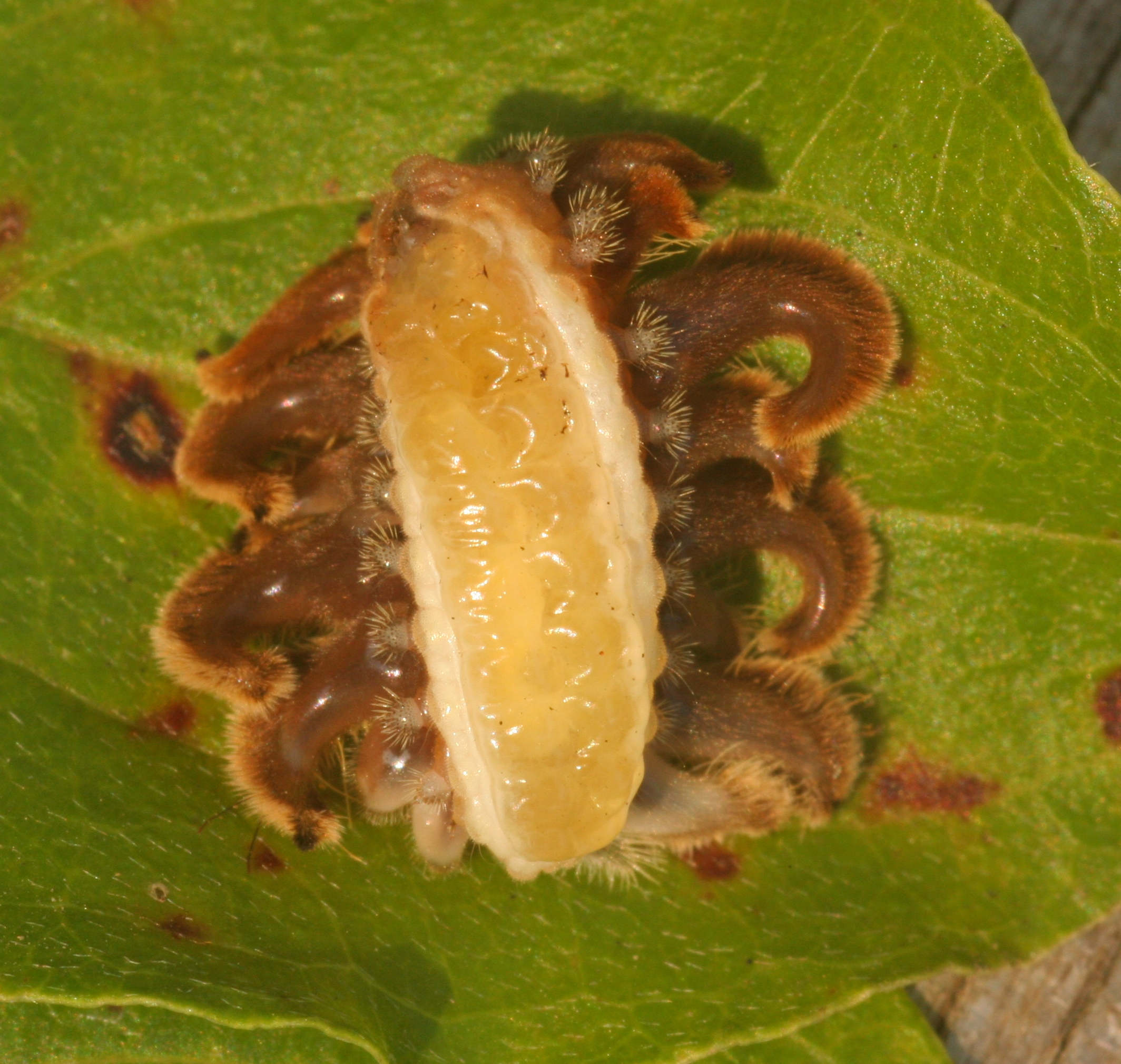
Underside of a monkey slug, showing the slimy pad in place of prolegs

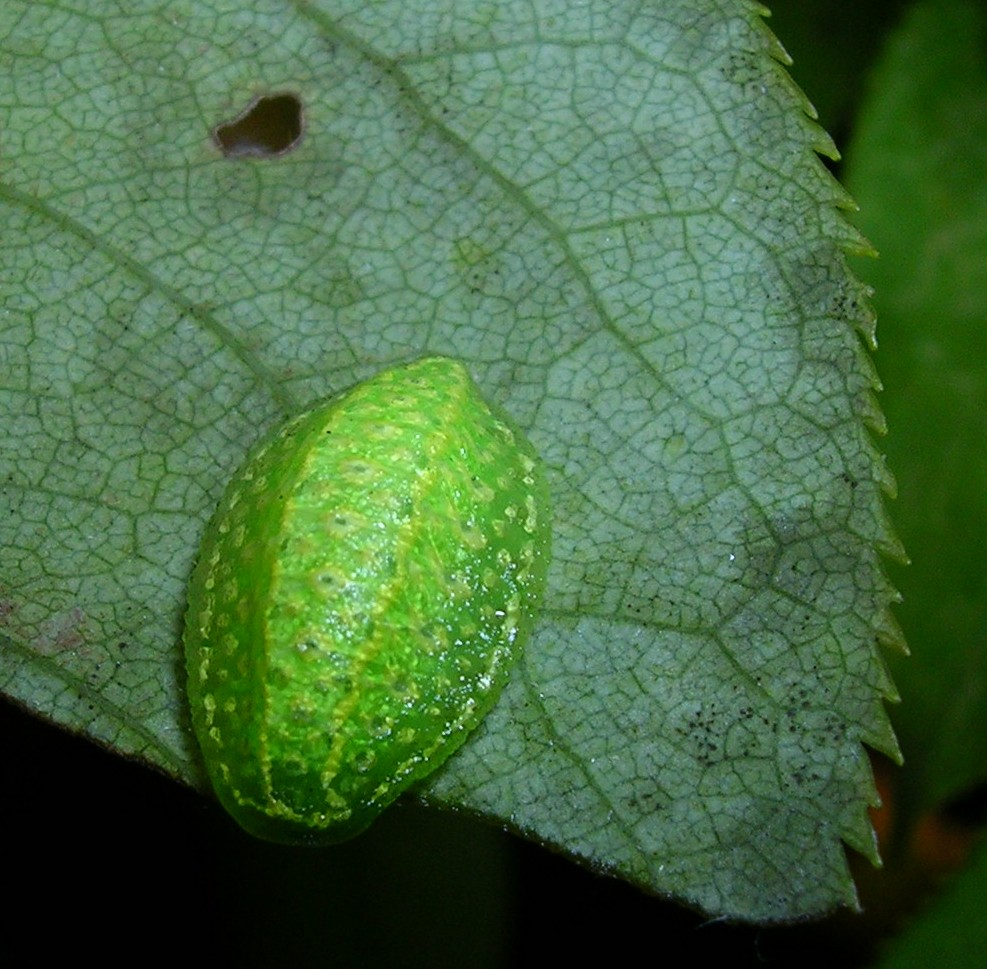
Larva of the yellow-shouldered slug, showing typical body shape

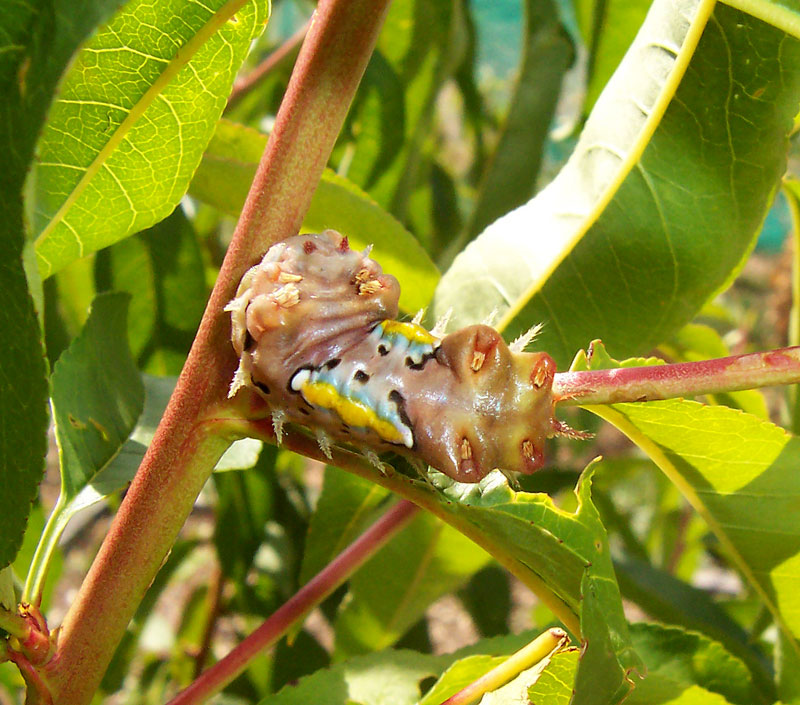
Doratifera larva, showing bright colours and presumably stinging setae

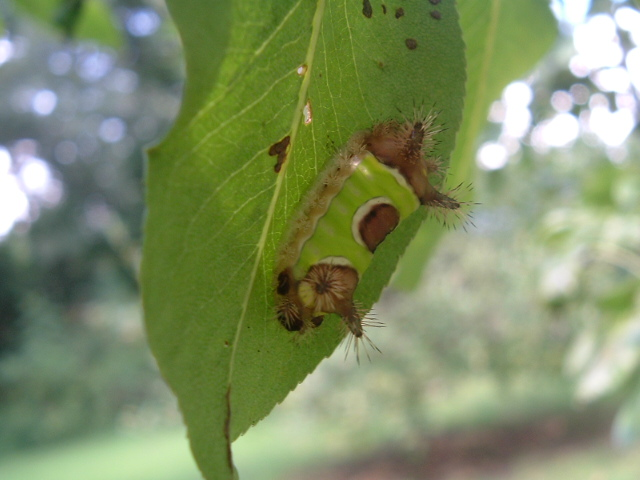
Sibine stimulea (saddleback caterpillar) larva

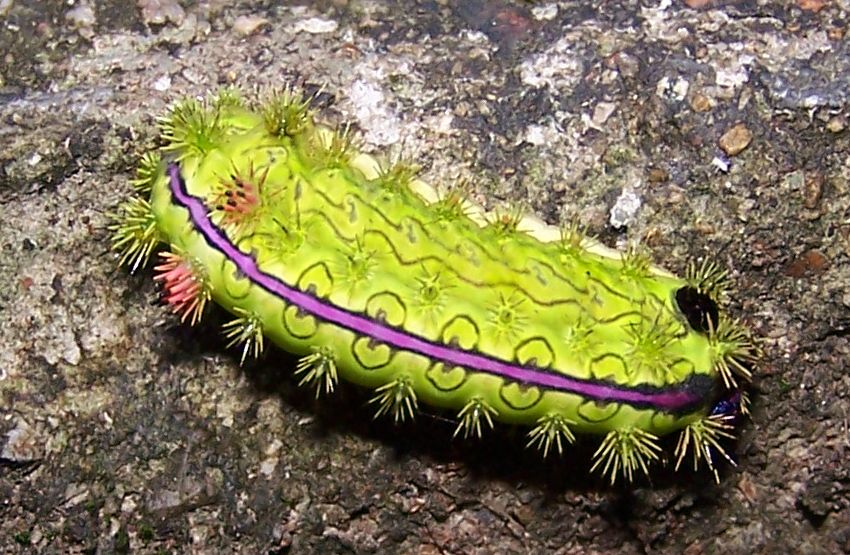
Larva of Parasa pastoralis

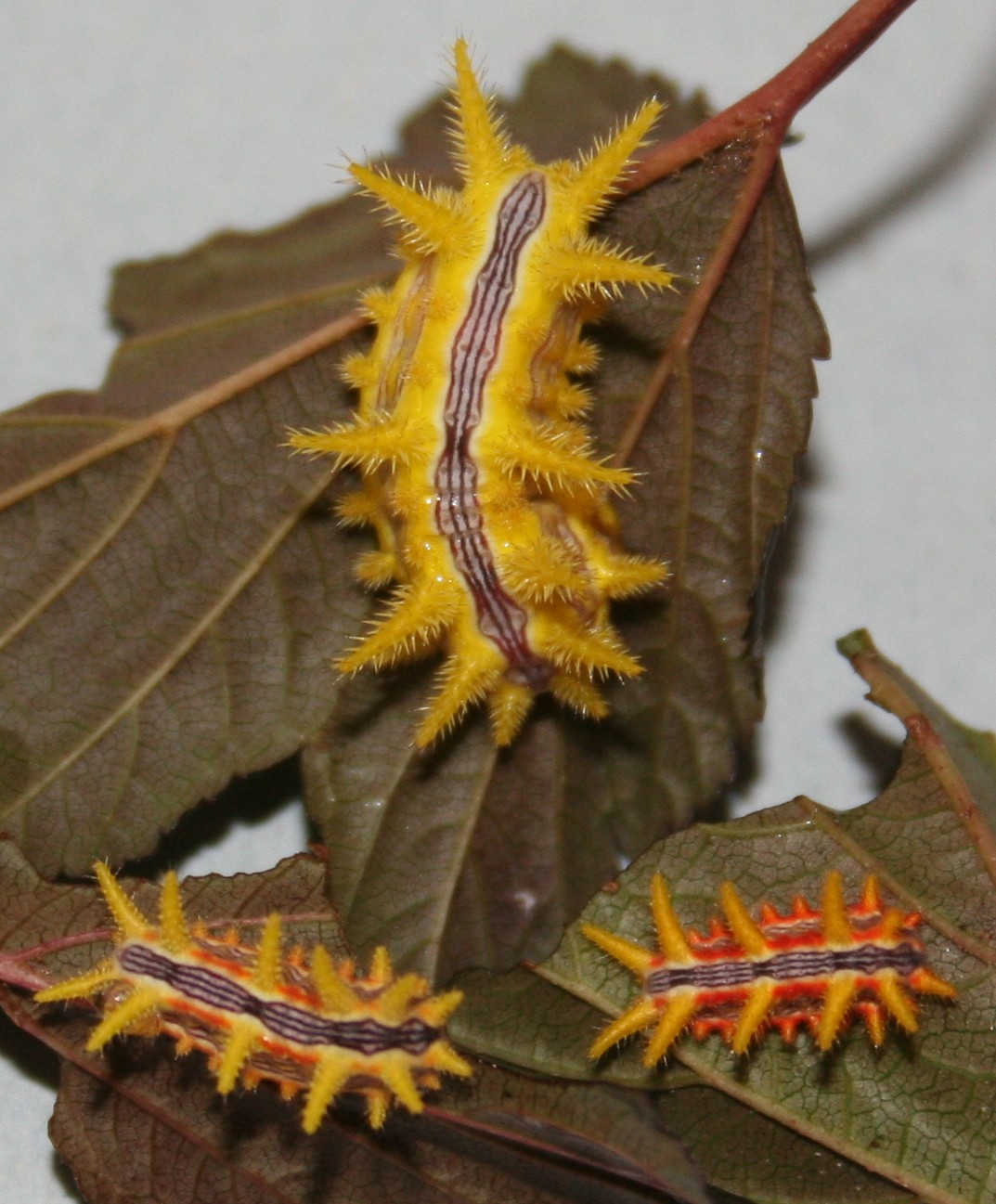
Stinging rose caterpillars (Parasa indetermina)

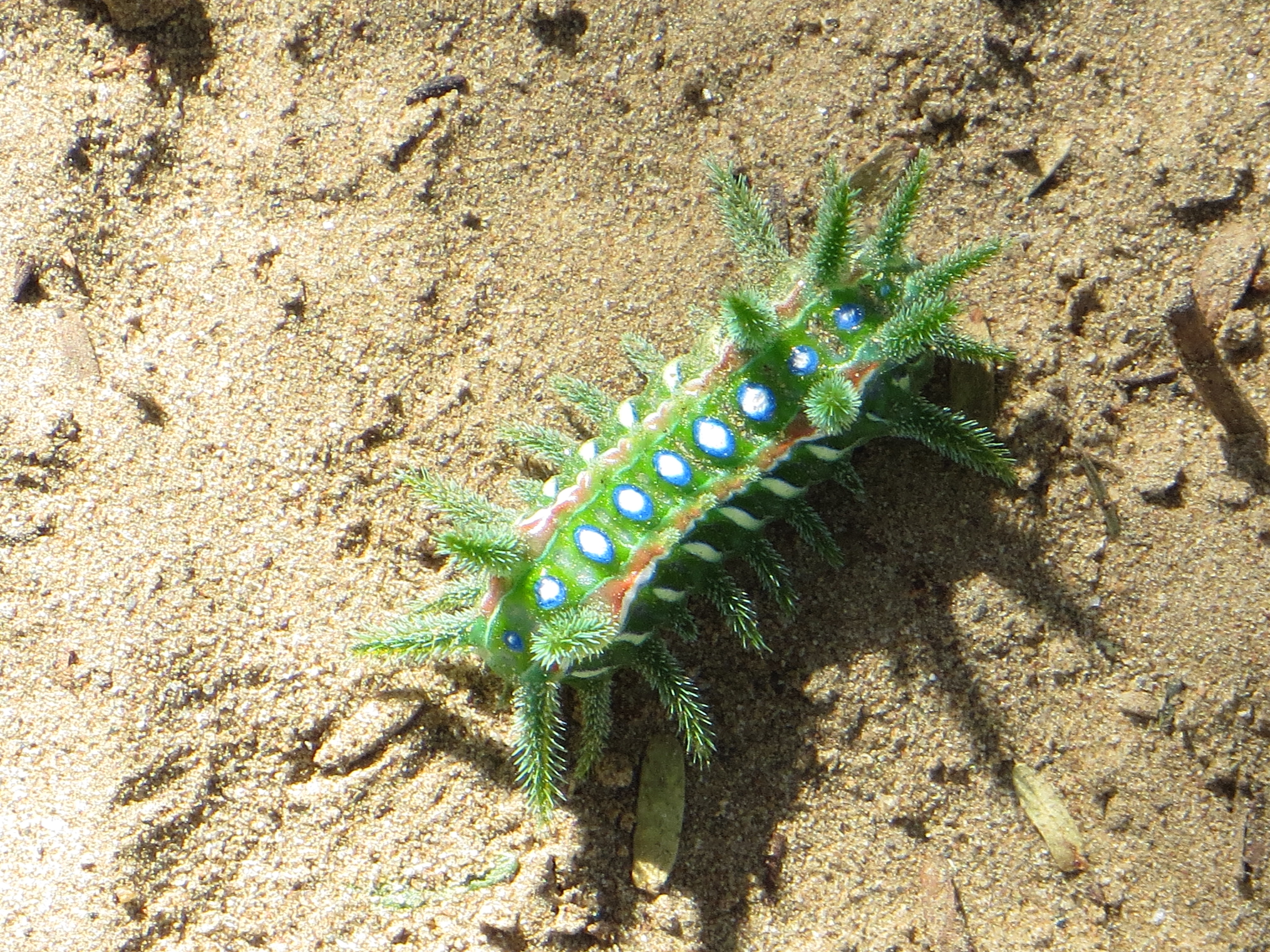
Limacodid larva

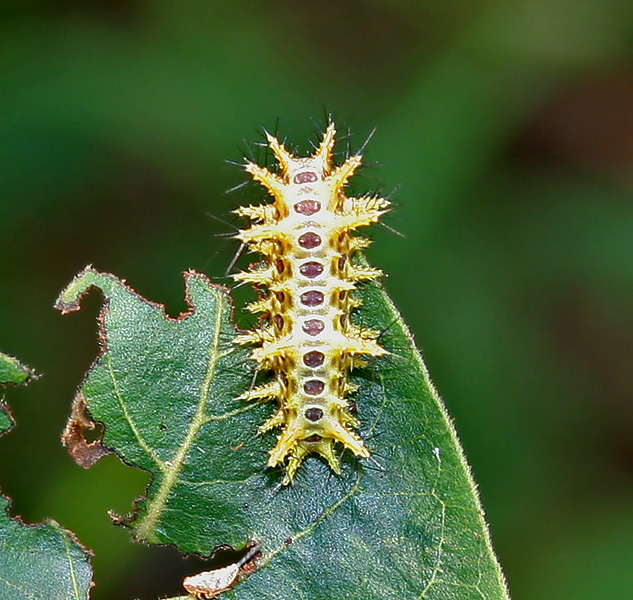
Limacodid (slug moth) caterpillar

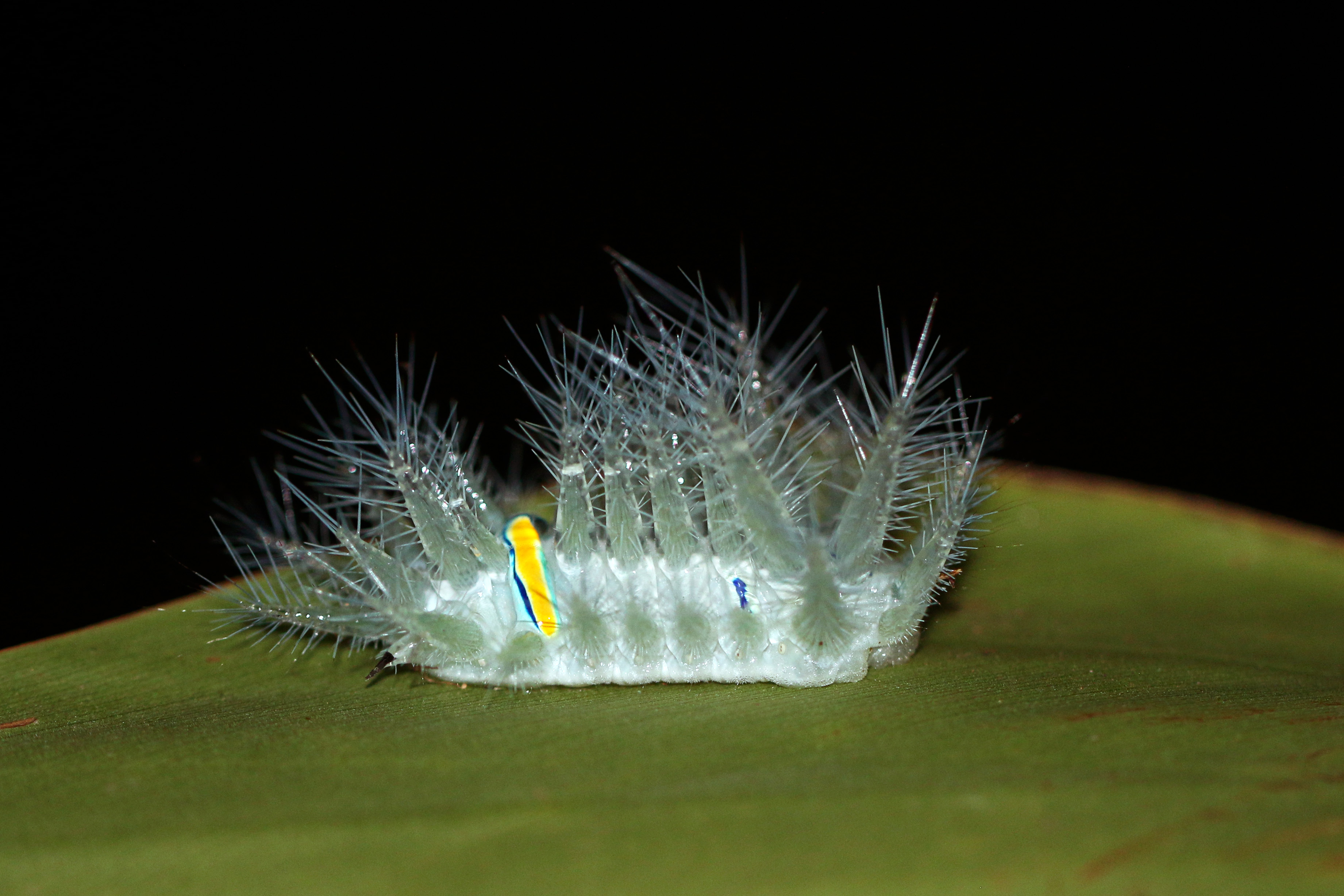
Slug moth caterpillar, Sabah, Borneo

=== Eggs ===
Eggs are flattened and thin. They are highly transparent and the larva can be seen developing inside. They may be laid singly or in clusters on leaves.

== Ecological importance ==
Limacodidae (e.g. Latoia viridissima, Parasa lepida, Penthocrates meyrick, Aarodia nana) have caused serious defoliation of palms.

== Notable species ==
- Hag moth or monkey slug (Phobetron pithecium)
- Ochre-winged hag moth or yellow-shouldered slug (Lithacodes fasciola)
- Spiny oak slug (Euclea delphinii)
- Crowned slug (Isa textula)
- Skiff moth (Prolimacodes badia)
- Nettle caterpillar (Latoia viridissima)
- Saddleback caterpillar (Acharia stimulea)
