= List of Limacodidae genera =

This is a complete taxonomy of the moth family Limacodidae.

== Subfamily Chrysopolominae ==
Achrocerides
Auripoloma
Chrysectropa
Chrysopoloma
Chrysopolomides
Diquishia
Ectropa
Ectropona
Erythropteryx
Hamartia
Muscectropa
Pseudectropona
Scotinocerides
Strigivenifera
Vietteopoloma

== Subfamily Limacodinae ==
Acharia
Apoda
Hoyosia
Miresa
Narosa
Perola
Pseudiragoides
Scopelodes
Sibine
Susica
Talima
Thosea

== Subfamily not yet assigned ==
=== A-D ===
Adoneta
Afraltha
Afrobirthama
Afromiresa
Afronarosa
Afroplax
Agisa
Alarodia
Allothosea
Altha
Althonarosa
Alunus
Ambaliha
Anepopsia
Angelus
Anilina
Ankijabe
Aphendala
Apluda
Apodecta
Apreptophanes
Araeogyia
Arctozygaena
Asbolia
Astatophlebia
Baria
Barilla
Beggina
Belippa
Birthama
Birthamoides
Birthamula
Boisduvalodes
Brachia
Brachiopsis
Brachypecta
Caffricola
Caissa
Calcarifera
Cania
Casphalia
Ceratonema
Chalcocelis
Chalcoscelides
Charistia
Cheromettia
Chibiraga
Chrysamma
Clamara
Claphidia
Cochliopodina
Coenobasis
Collenettea
Comana
Comanula
Compactena
Compsopsectra
Contheyla
Contheyloides
Cosuma
Crothaema
Cryptophobetron
Ctenolita
Cyclopterana
Dactylorhyncha
Darna
Delorhachis
Deltoptera
Demonarosa (inc. Arbelarosa, Natarosa)
Dichromapteryx
Dinawides
Doratifera

=== E-L ===
Eccopa
Ecnomoctena
Elassoptila
Epiclea
Epiperola
Erotomania
Eukarschia
Euphlycta
Euphlyctina
Euphlyctinides
Euphobetron
Euprosterna
Featheria
Fignya
Fletcherodes
Gavara
Gyroptera
Hadraphe
Halseyia
Hampsonella
Hedraea
Hegetor
Heringocena
Heringodes
Heuretes
Hilipoda
Hindothosea
Homosusica
Hydroclada
Hyphorma
Hyphormides
Hypselolopha
Idonauton
Inous
Iraga
Iragoides
Irostola
Isochaetes
Isopenthocrates
Isozinara
Jordaniana
Kronaea
Lamprolepida
Laruma
Latoia (inc. Lemuriostroter)
Latoiola
Lembopteris
Lemuria
Lemuricomes
Lepidorytis
Leucophobetron
Limacocera
Limacochara
Limacolasia
Limacontia
Limacorina
Limacosilla
Liparolasia
Lithacodes

=== M-P ===
Macroplectra
Macroplectrina
Macrosemyra
Magos
Mahanta
Malgassica
Mambara
Mambarilla
Mambarona
Mandoto
Marmorata
Matsumurides
Micraphe
Microcampa
Microleon
Microphobetron
Miresina
Monema
Monoleuca
Monopecta
Nagoda
Nagodopsis
Narosana
Narosoideus
Narosopsis
Naryciodes
Natada (inc. Mareda, Vipsorola)
Neiraga
Neogavara
Neomocena
Niaca
Niphadolepsis
Nirmides
Oidemaskelis
Olona
Omocena
Omocenoides
Omocenops
Oxyplax
Pachyphlebina
Packardia
Paraclea
Paragetor
Paramonema
Paraplectra
Parapluda
Parasa
Parasoidea
Paryphantina
Penthocrates
Phlossa
Phobetron
Phocoderma
Phorma
Phrixolepia
Pinzulenza
Platyprosterna
Ploneta
Praesetora
Praesusica
Probalintha
Prolatoia
Prolimacodes
Prosternidia
Pseudaltha
Pseudanapaea
Pseudidonauton
Pseudolatoia
Pseudomantria
Pseudomocena
Pseudopsyche
Pseudothosea
Pseudovipsania
Psythiarodes
Pygmaeomorpha

=== R-Z ===
Rarithea
Renada
Rhamnosa
Rhypteira
Scotinochroa
Semibirthama
Semyra
Semyrilla
Setora
Sisyrosea
Slossonella
Spatulifimbria
Sporetolepis
Squamosa
Squamosala
Stenomonema
Stroter
Stroteroides
Surida
Taeda
Tanadema
Teinorhyncha
Tetraphleba
Theosea
Thliptocnemis
Thoseidea
Tortricidia
Trachyptena
Trachyptenidia
Trichogyia
Triplophleps
Trogocrada
Tryphax
Ulamia
Unipectiphora
Uniserrata
Unithosea
Venadicodia
Vietteiola
Vipsania
Vipsophobetron
Xanthopteryx
Ximacodes
Zaparasa
Zarachella
Zinara
Zorostola
