= Talima =

Talima may refer to:

- Talima (moth), a moth genus of the family Limacodidae
- Talima (beetle), a former beetle genus of the family Curculionidae since revised as Talimanus Marshall, 1943
- 5902 Talima, a minor planet
