= Caissa =

Caissa may refer to:

- Caïssa, a mythical Thracian dryad portrayed as the goddess of chess
- Caissa (moth), a moth genus in the family Limacodidae
- Caissa Capital, a hedge fund based on volatility arbitrage in the late 1990s
