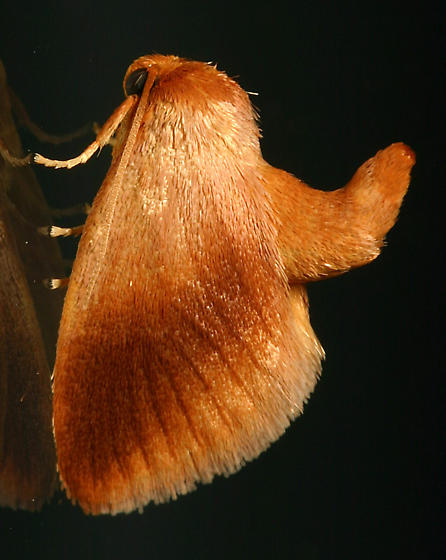

Scientific classification
- Domain: Eukaryota
- Kingdom: Animalia
- Phylum: Arthropoda
- Class: Insecta
- Order: Lepidoptera
- Family: Limacodidae
- Genus: Tortricidia
- Species: T. testacea

Binomial name
- Tortricidia testacea Packard, 1864

Synonyms
- Tortricidia testacea crypta

= Tortricidia testacea =

Species of moth

The warm-chevroned moth (Tortricidia testacea) is a moth of the family Limacodidae. It is found from Nova Scotia west and south to Manitoba, Missouri and Mississippi. There is also a record from South Carolina.

The wingspan is 15–26 mm. Adults are on wing from April to August.

The larvae feed on beech, birch, black cherry, chestnut, oak and witch-hazel.

== See also ==
- Tortricidia pallida (Herrich-Schäffer, 1854)
- Tortricidia flexuosa (Grote, 1880)
- Tortricidia
