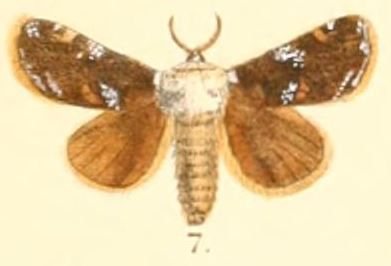

Scientific classification
- Kingdom: Animalia
- Phylum: Arthropoda
- Class: Insecta
- Order: Lepidoptera
- Family: Limacodidae
- Genus: Belippa
- Species: B. thoracica

Binomial name
- Belippa thoracica (Moore, 1879)

Synonyms
- Contheyla thoracica Moore, 1879

= Belippa thoracica =

Species of moth

Belippa thoracica is a moth of the family Limacodidae. It is found in India and Myanmar.
