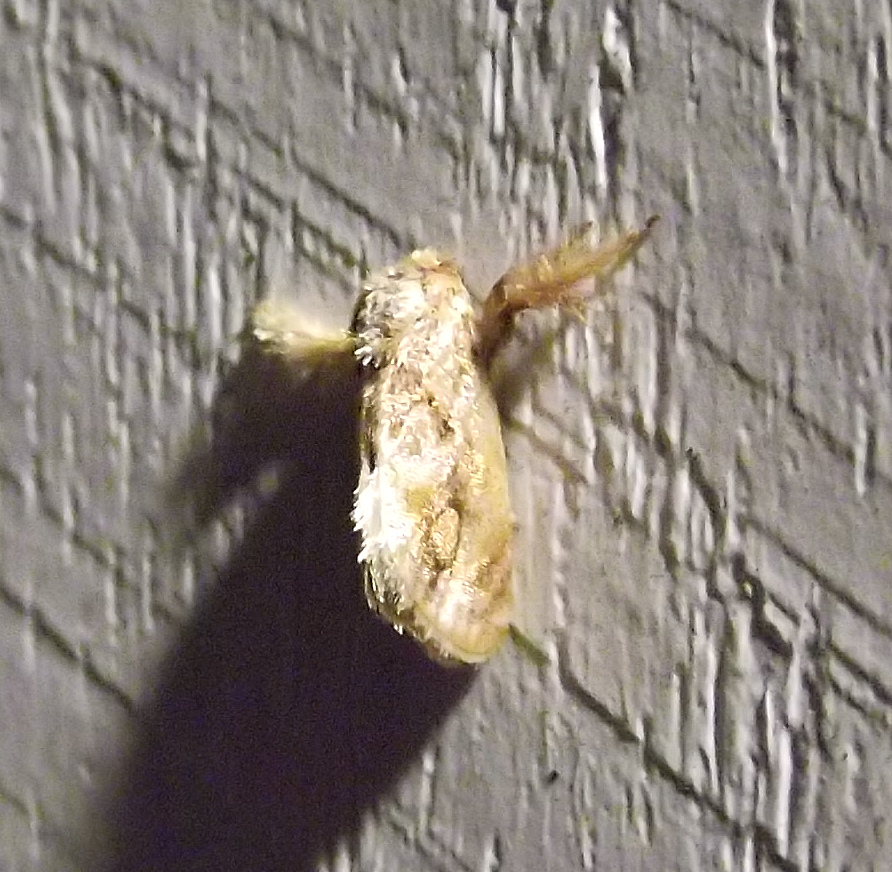
- Adult form
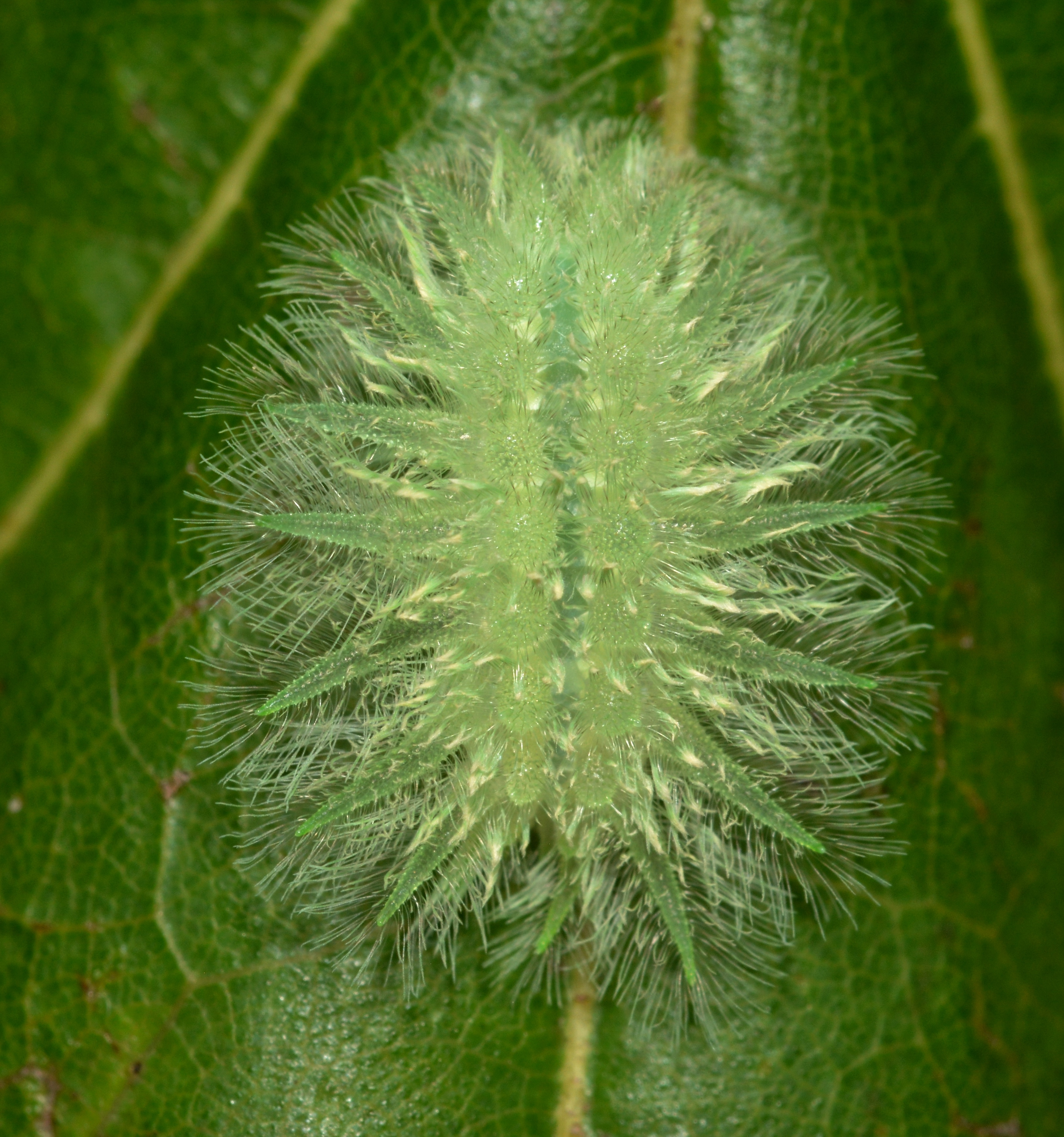
- Caterpillar

Scientific classification
- Domain: Eukaryota
- Kingdom: Animalia
- Phylum: Arthropoda
- Class: Insecta
- Order: Lepidoptera
- Family: Limacodidae
- Genus: Isochaetes
- Species: I. beutenmuelleri

Binomial name
- Isochaetes beutenmuelleri (H. Edwards, 1889)

Synonyms
- Limacodes beutenmuelleri Edwards, 1889

= Isochaetes beutenmuelleri =

Species of moth

Isochaetes beutenmuelleri, the spun glass slug moth, is a moth of the family Limacodidae. It is found in the United States from New York to Florida and west to Colorado and Texas.

Their wingspan is 19–24 mm. Adults are on wing from June to August.

The larvae feed on oak and beech.
