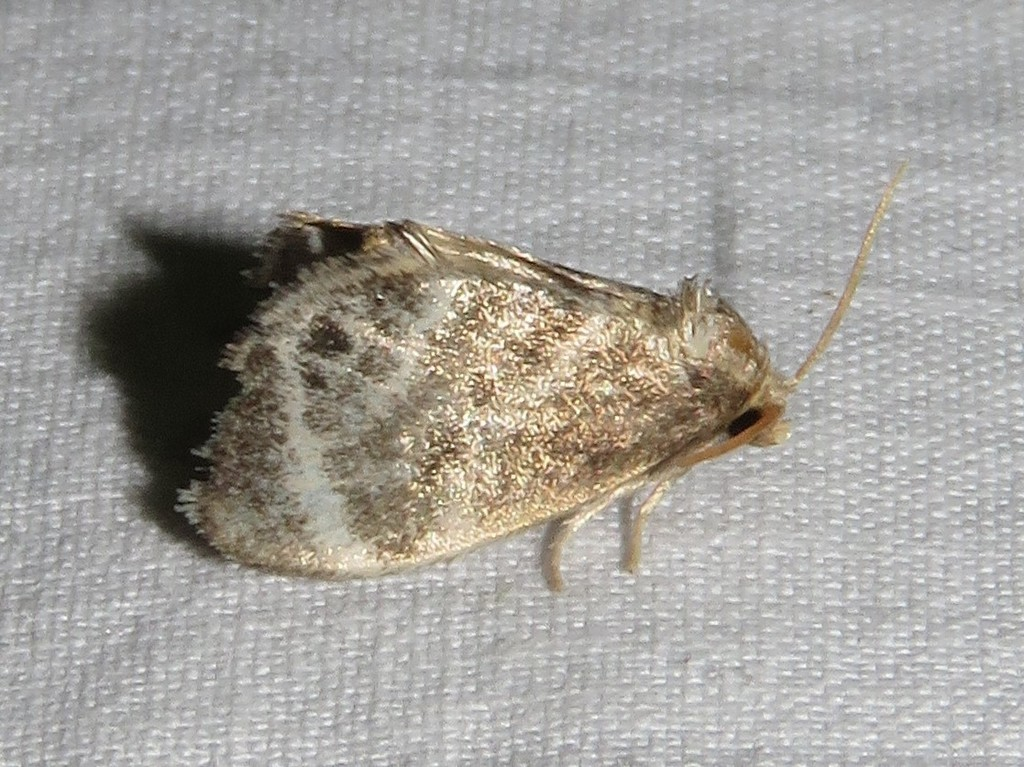

Scientific classification
- Domain: Eukaryota
- Kingdom: Animalia
- Phylum: Arthropoda
- Class: Insecta
- Order: Lepidoptera
- Family: Limacodidae
- Genus: Packardia
- Species: P. elegans

Binomial name
- Packardia elegans (Packard, 1864)

Synonyms
- Cyrtosia elegans Packard, 1864; Cyrtosia fusca Packard, 1864; Packardia fusca; Packardia nigripunctata Goodell, 1881

= Packardia elegans =

Species of moth

Packardia elegans, the elegant tailed slug moth, is a species of moth in the family Limacodidae. It is found in Canada and the United States, where it has been recorded from woodlands and forests, ranging from north-eastern Missouri to Quebec and Maine, south to north-eastern Georgia.

The length of the forewings is 10–12 mm.

The larvae feed on various woody plants, including beech, cherry and oak.

== Subspecies ==
- Packardia elegans elegans
- Packardia elegans fusca (Packard, 1864)

== See also ==
- List of moths of North America (MONA 4618-5509)
