= Narosa fletcheri =

Scientific classification
- Domain: Eukaryota
- Kingdom: Animalia
- Phylum: Arthropoda
- Class: Insecta
- Order: Lepidoptera
- Family: Limacodidae
- Genus: Narosa
- Species: N. fletcheri

Binomial name
- Narosa fletcheri West, 1937

Species of moth

Narosa fletcheri is a moth of the family Limacodidae first described by West in 1937. It is found in Sri Lanka.
