= Compsopsectra elegans =

Scientific classification
- Kingdom: Animalia
- Phylum: Arthropoda
- Class: Insecta
- Order: Lepidoptera
- Family: Limacodidae
- Genus: Compsopsectra
- Species: C. elegans

Binomial name
- Compsopsectra elegans West, 1932

Species of moth

Compsopsectra elegans is a species of moth in the family Limacodidae. It is the type species of its genus. The type specimen was from the Philippines islands (Mindanao Island, subprovince Lanao, Kolambugan plains).
