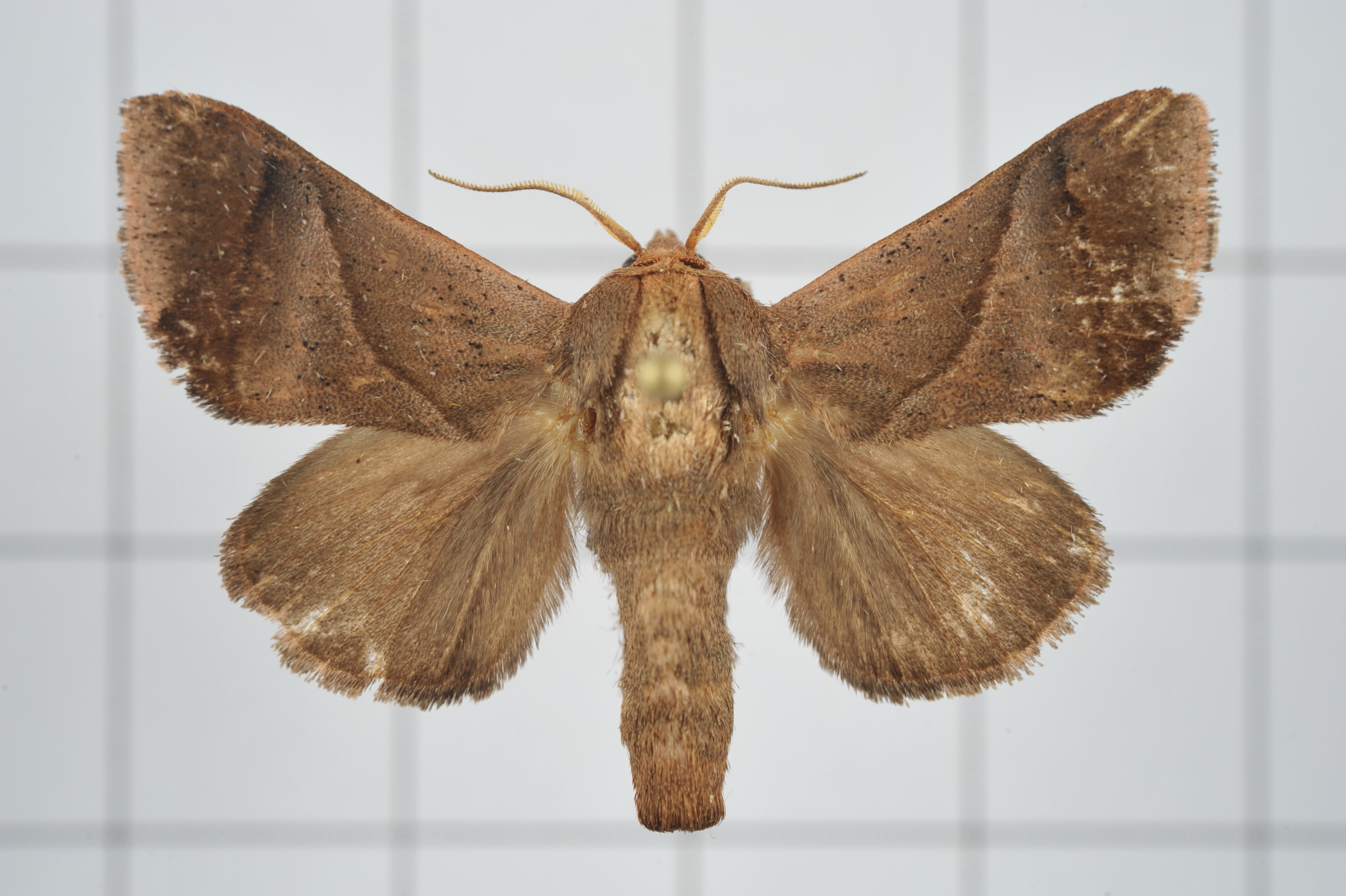

Scientific classification
- Domain: Eukaryota
- Kingdom: Animalia
- Phylum: Arthropoda
- Class: Insecta
- Order: Lepidoptera
- Family: Limacodidae
- Genus: Setora
- Species: S. postornata

Binomial name
- Setora postornata (Hampson, 1900)

Synonyms
- Setora postornata f. hampsoni Strand, 1922; Setora sinensis Moore, 1877; Thosea hampsoni Strand, 1922; Thosea postornata Hampson, 1900

= Setora postornata =

Species of moth

Setora postornata is a species of slug moth described by George Hampson in 1900. It is found in Asia, more specifically in Northeastern India, Nepal, Bhutan, China, Vietnam, and Northern Laos.

The Setora postornata feeds on plants.

It can cause allergic reactions.
