= Pseudiragoides florianii =

Scientific classification
- Kingdom: Animalia
- Phylum: Arthropoda
- Clade: Pancrustacea
- Class: Insecta
- Order: Lepidoptera
- Family: Limacodidae
- Genus: Pseudiragoides
- Species: P. florianii

Binomial name
- Pseudiragoides florianii Solovyev & Witt, 2011

Species of moth

Pseudiragoides florianii is a species of moth of the family Limacodidae. It is found in China (Guangxi, Fujian, Hunan and Zhejiang) at altitudes between 1,200 and 2,300 meters.

The length of the forewings is 13–15 mm for males. They have a wingspan of 27–32 mm. Adults have been found from the end of April to the beginning of June.

== Etymology ==
It is named for the Italian lepidopterist Alessandro Floriani.
