= Pseudaltha eboris =

Scientific classification
- Domain: Eukaryota
- Kingdom: Animalia
- Phylum: Arthropoda
- Class: Insecta
- Order: Lepidoptera
- Family: Limacodidae
- Genus: Pseudaltha
- Species: P. eboris

Binomial name
- Pseudaltha eboris Solovyev, 2009

Species of moth

Pseudaltha eboris is a species of moth of the family Limacodidae. It is found in northern Thailand (Chiang Mai) on an altitude of 1,820 meters.

The wingspan is about 26 mm. Adults have been recorded in early June.
