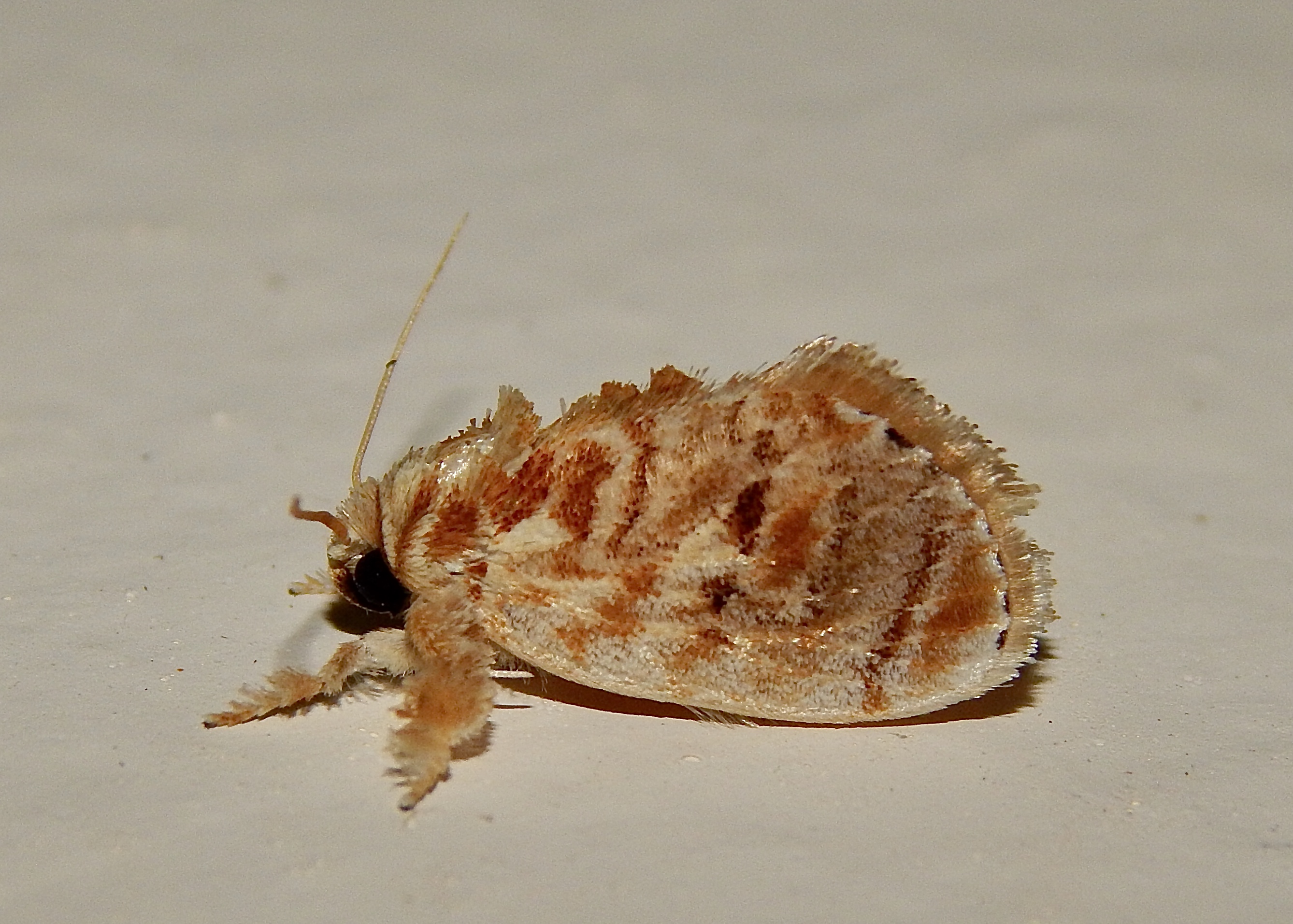

Scientific classification
- Kingdom: Animalia
- Phylum: Arthropoda
- Class: Insecta
- Order: Lepidoptera
- Family: Limacodidae
- Genus: Narosa
- Species: N. conspersa

Binomial name
- Narosa conspersa Walker, 1855

= Narosa conspersa =

Species of moth

Narosa conspersa is a moth of the family Limacodidae first described by Francis Walker in 1855. It is found in Sri Lanka.
