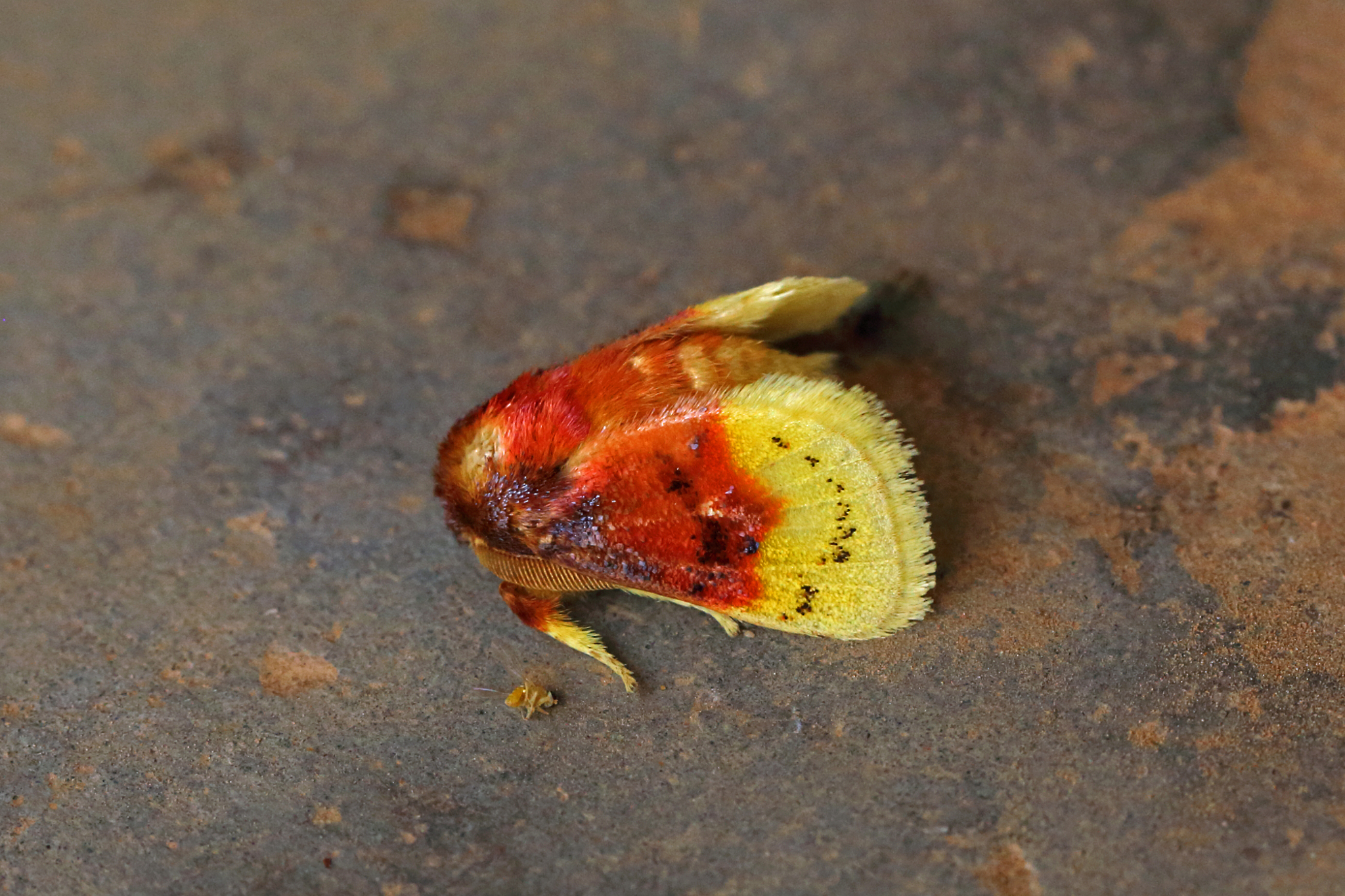

Scientific classification
- Kingdom: Animalia
- Phylum: Arthropoda
- Class: Insecta
- Order: Lepidoptera
- Family: Limacodidae
- Genus: Chrysamma
- Species: C. purpuripulcra

Binomial name
- Chrysamma purpuripulcra Karsch, 1896

Synonyms
- Altha ansorgei

= Chrysamma purpuripulcra =

Species of moth

Chrysamma purpuripulcra, the wounded slug, is a species of slug moth described by Ferdinand Karsch in 1896.

== Subspecies ==
- Chrysamma purpuripulcra purpuripulcra Karsch, 1896
- Chrysamma purpuripulcra sudanicola Clench, 1955
