= Fignya melkaya =

Scientific classification
- Kingdom: Animalia
- Phylum: Arthropoda
- Clade: Pancrustacea
- Class: Insecta
- Order: Lepidoptera
- Family: Limacodidae
- Genus: Fignya
- Species: F. melkaya

Binomial name
- Fignya melkaya Solovyev & Witt, 2009

Species of moth

Fignya melkaya is a species of moth belonging to the genus Fignya of the family Limacodidae. It was described in 2009 by A. V. Solovyev of Ulyanovsk State Pedagogical University and Thomas Witt, founder of the Museum Witt Munich.

The species occurs in China and Vietnam, particularly on Mount Fansipan.

The generic name derives from the Russian word fignya (meaning "trifle" or "something insignificant"), while the specific epithet melkaya means "small". Subsequently, a second species, F. ravalba, was discovered in Xinjiang; it differs by its paler coloration, the name being formed from the Latin ravus ("greyish-yellow") and albus ("white").
