= Spatulifimbria castaneiceps =

Scientific classification
- Kingdom: Animalia
- Phylum: Arthropoda
- Class: Insecta
- Order: Lepidoptera
- Family: Limacodidae
- Genus: Spatulifimbria
- Species: S. castaneiceps

Binomial name
- Spatulifimbria castaneiceps Hampson, 1892

Species of moth

Spatulifimbria castaneiceps is a moth of the family Limacodidae first described by George Hampson in 1892. It is found in Sri Lanka, Hong Kong and Taiwan.

Forewings grayish brown. Antennae bipectinate. Caterpillar brownish with yellow and reddish markings. Pupa whitish with brown mottles. Caterpillar is a pest on castor, mango and tea.

Two subspecies are recorded.

- Spatulifimbria castaneiceps insolita Hering, 1931
- Spatulifimbria castaneiceps opprimata Hering, 1931
