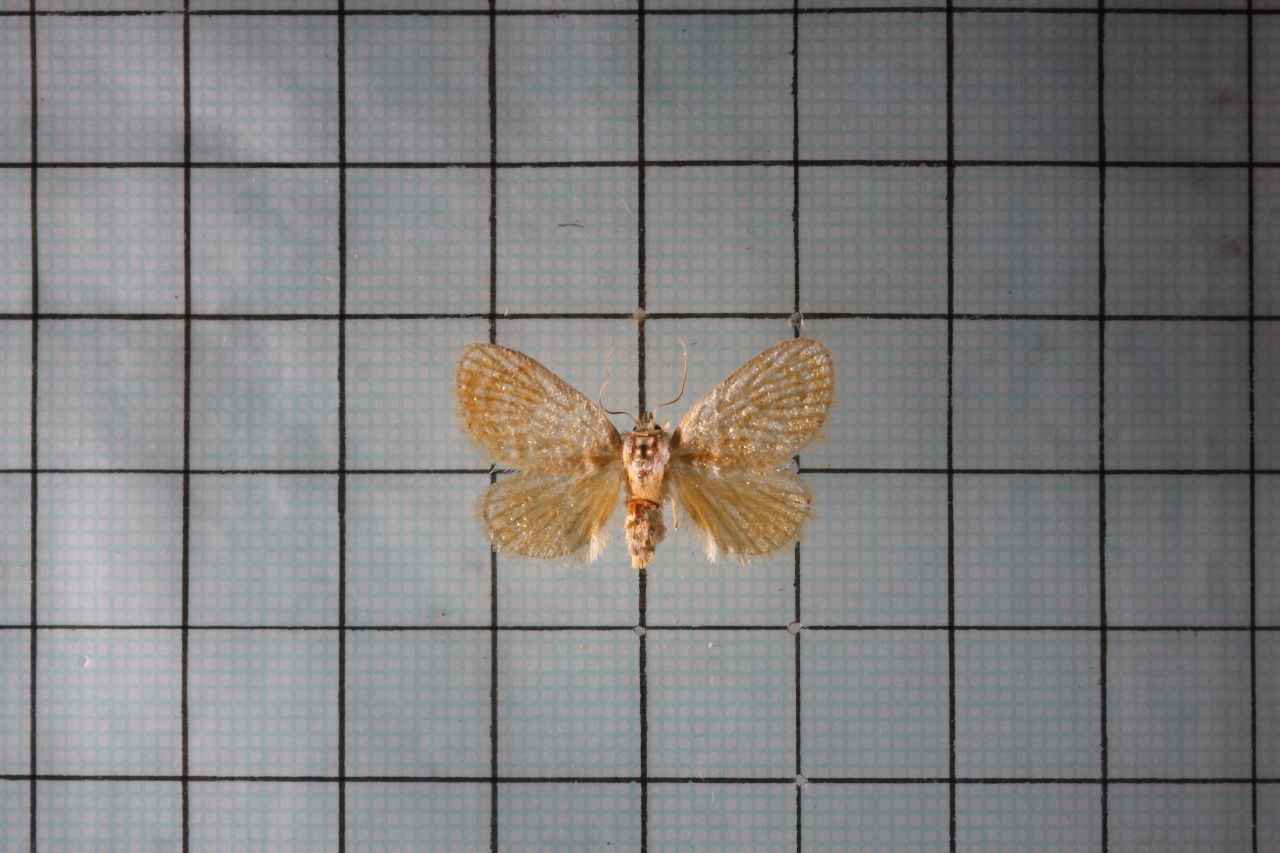

Scientific classification
- Domain: Eukaryota
- Kingdom: Animalia
- Phylum: Arthropoda
- Class: Insecta
- Order: Lepidoptera
- Family: Limacodidae
- Genus: Narosa
- Species: N. fulgens

Binomial name
- Narosa fulgens (Leech, 1889)

Synonyms
- Heterogenea fulgens Leech, 1889; Heterogenea uncula var. fulgens; Microcampa fulgens; Kitanola fulgens

= Narosa fulgens =

Species of moth

Narosa fulgens is a moth in the family Limacodidae. It is found in Taiwan, Korea and Japan.
