= Compsopsectra =

Scientific classification
- Kingdom: Animalia
- Phylum: Arthropoda
- Class: Insecta
- Order: Lepidoptera
- Family: Limacodidae
- Genus: Compsopsectra; West, 1932

Genus of moths

Compsopsectra is a genus of moths in the family Limacodidae.

== Species ==
- Compsopsectra elegans West, 1932
- Compsopsectra sundana Holloway, 1990

== See also ==
- List of Limacodidae genera
