= Epiclea =

Scientific classification
- Kingdom: Animalia
- Phylum: Arthropoda
- Clade: Pancrustacea
- Class: Insecta
- Order: Lepidoptera
- Family: Limacodidae
- Genus: Epiclea; Dyar, 1905

Species
- See text

Genus of moths

Epiclea is a genus of moths belonging to the family Limacodidae. Its exact sub-family has not currently been determined. The genus is found in Central America.

== Species ==
- Epiclea elaea (Druce, 1887)
