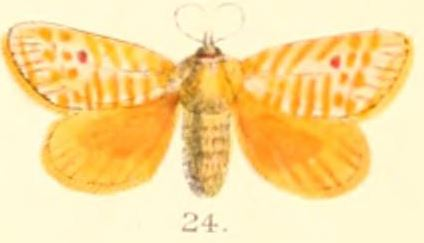

Scientific classification
- Domain: Eukaryota
- Kingdom: Animalia
- Phylum: Arthropoda
- Class: Insecta
- Order: Lepidoptera
- Family: Limacodidae
- Genus: Demonarosa
- Species: D. rufotessellata

Binomial name
- Demonarosa rufotessellata (Moore, 1879)

Synonyms
- Narosa rufotessellata Moore, 1879; Arbelarosa rufotessellata; Cheromettia melli Hering, 1931; Demonarosa rosea Matsumura, 1931

= Demonarosa rufotessellata =

Species of moth

Demonarosa rufotessellata is a moth of the family Limacodidae. It is found on Borneo, as well as in India, Nepal, Myanmar, Thailand, Laos, Vietnam, the Philippines, Taiwan and Japan.

== Subspecies ==
- Demonarosa rufotessellata rufotessellata
- Demonarosa rufotessellata subrosea (Wileman, 1915) (Taiwan)
- Demonarosa rufotessellata issiki (Kawazoe & Ogata, 1962) (Japan)
