= Pseudiragoides spadix =

Scientific classification
- Kingdom: Animalia
- Phylum: Arthropoda
- Clade: Pancrustacea
- Class: Insecta
- Order: Lepidoptera
- Family: Limacodidae
- Genus: Pseudiragoides
- Species: P. spadix

Binomial name
- Pseudiragoides spadix Solovyev & Witt, 2009

Species of moth

Pseudiragoides spadix is a species of moth of the family Limacodidae. It is found on the western side of the Fansipan in the Vietnamese Yunnan mountains.

The length of the forewings is 15–16 mm for males. They have a wingspan of 32–34 mm.
