= Pseudaltha sapa =

Scientific classification
- Domain: Eukaryota
- Kingdom: Animalia
- Phylum: Arthropoda
- Class: Insecta
- Order: Lepidoptera
- Family: Limacodidae
- Genus: Pseudaltha
- Species: P. sapa

Binomial name
- Pseudaltha sapa Solovyev, 2009

Species of moth

Pseudaltha sapa is a species of moth of the family Limacodidae. It is found in northern Thailand and northern Vietnam at altitudes of 1,600 to 2,400 meters.

The wingspan is 25–28 mm. The abdomen is whitish ochre. Adults have been recorded in May, June, July and September.

== Etymology ==
The species name sapa refers to the type locality of Sa Pa in Vietnam.
