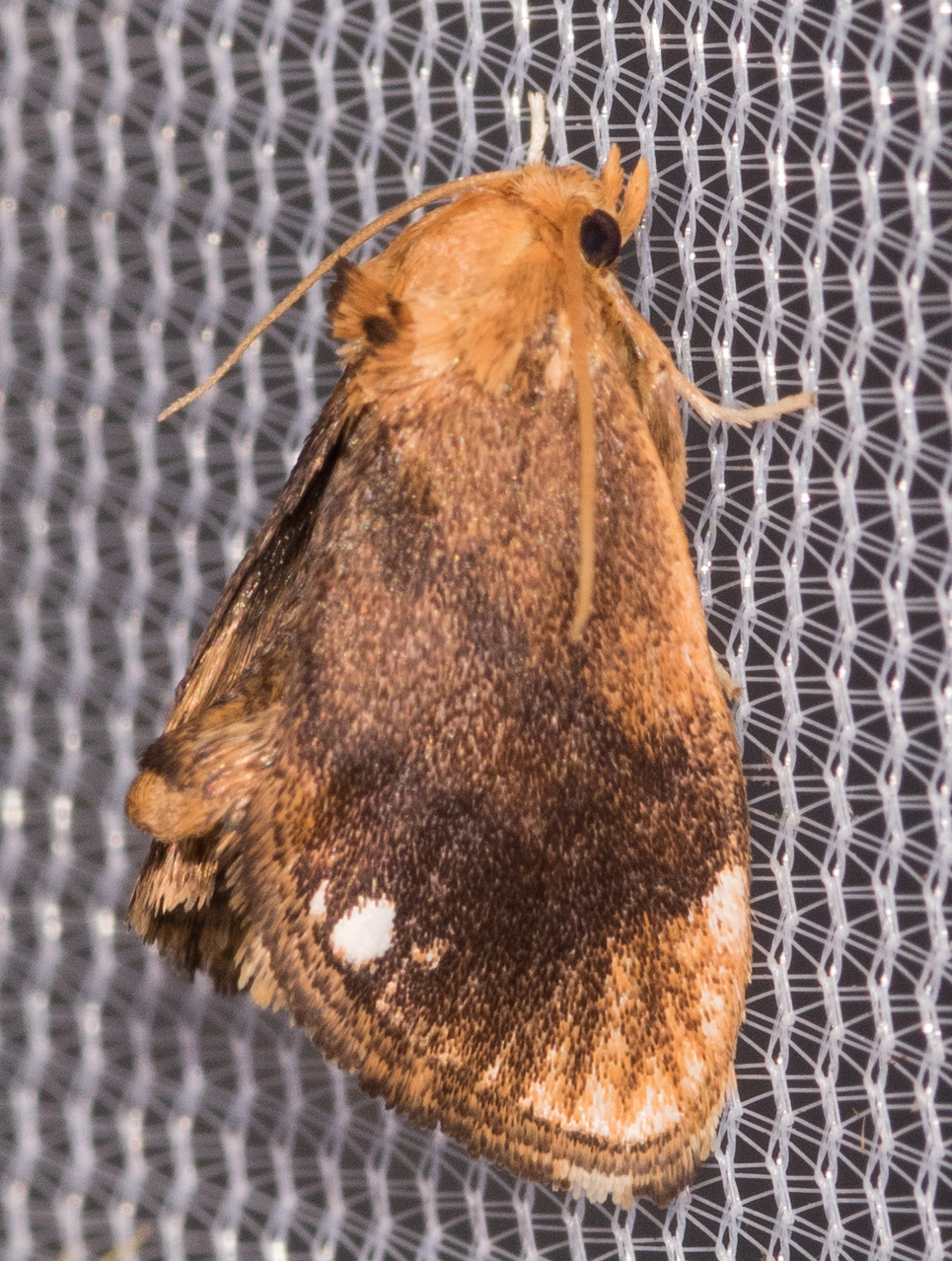
- Packardia albipunctata, Pleasant Walk Road, Frederick County, Maryland (May 28, 2016), at UV light.

Scientific classification
- Kingdom: Animalia
- Phylum: Arthropoda
- Class: Insecta
- Order: Lepidoptera
- Family: Limacodidae
- Genus: Packardia; Grote & Robinson, 1866

Synonyms
- Cyrtosia (Packard, 1864)

= Packardia =

Genus of moths

Packardia is a genus of moths in the family Limacodidae.

== Species ==
- Packardia albipunctata (Packard, 1864)
- Packardia ceanothi Dyar, 1908
- Packardia elegans (Packard, 1864)
- Packardia geminata (Packard, 1864)

== See also ==
- List of Limacodidae genera
