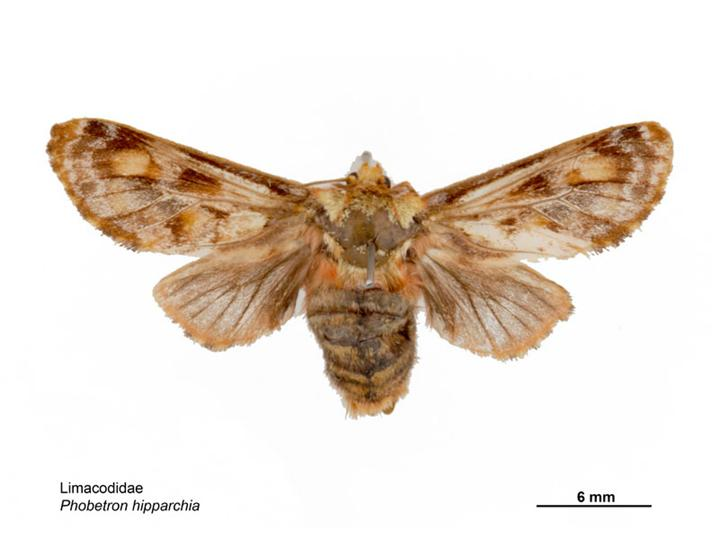
- Dorsal view
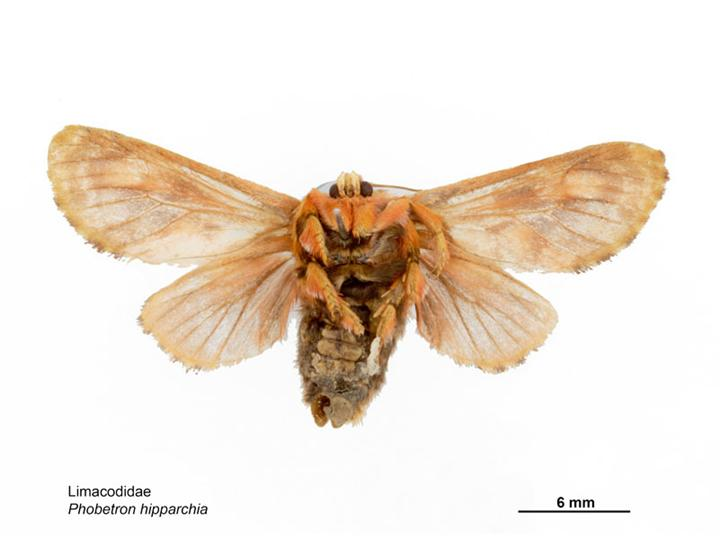
- Ventral view

Scientific classification
- Domain: Eukaryota
- Kingdom: Animalia
- Phylum: Arthropoda
- Class: Insecta
- Order: Lepidoptera
- Family: Limacodidae
- Genus: Phobetron
- Species: P. hipparchia

Binomial name
- Phobetron hipparchia (Cramer, [1777])

Synonyms
- Phalaena hipparchia Cramer, [1777]; Euryda variolaris Herrich-Schäffer, [1854]

= Phobetron hipparchia =

Monkey slug

Species of moth

Phobetron hipparchia, the monkey slug, is a moth of the family Limacodidae. It is found in Mexico, Panama, Ecuador, Colombia, Venezuela, the Guianas, Brazil and Argentina.

The larvae feed on Gliricidia sepium.

== Gallery ==
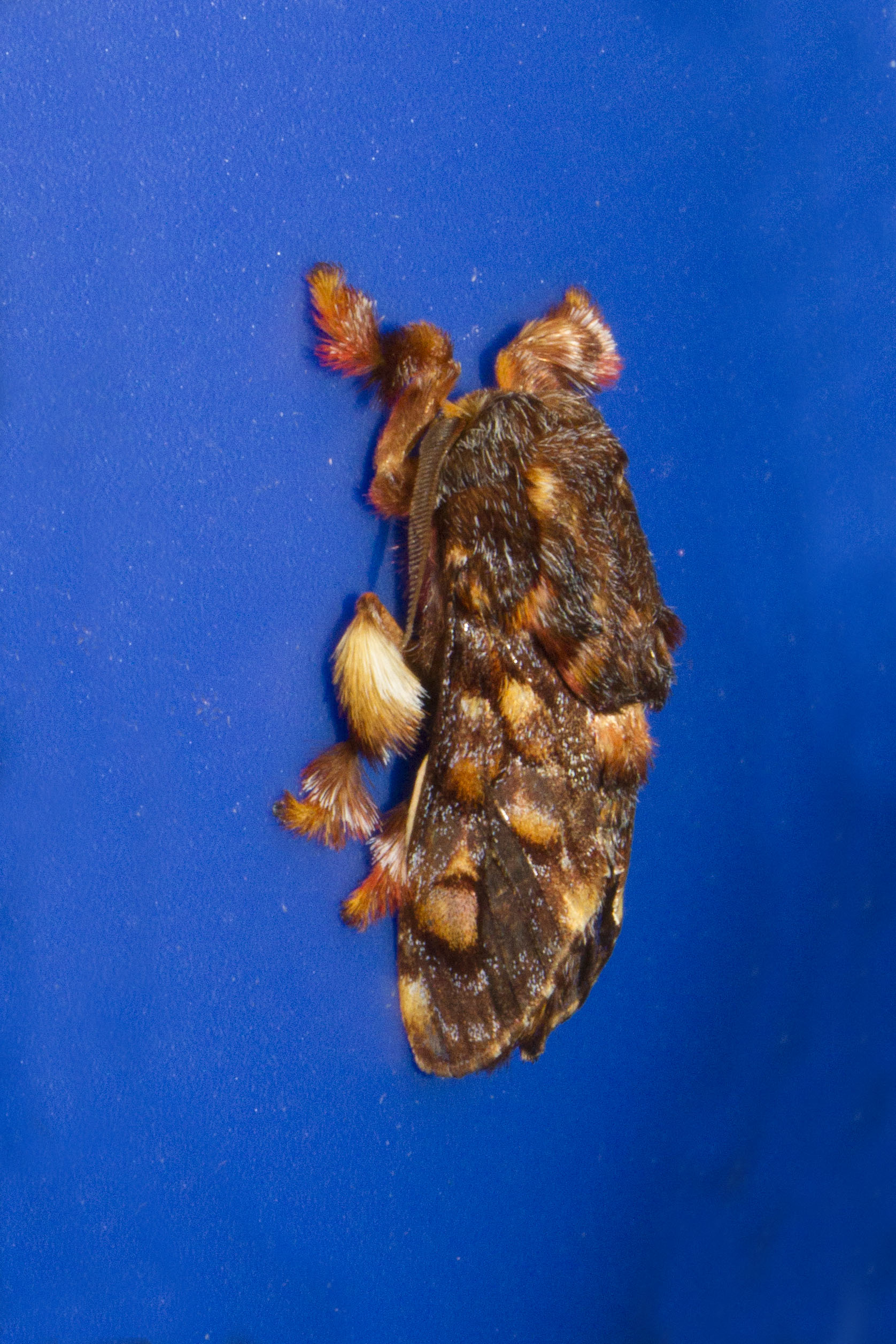

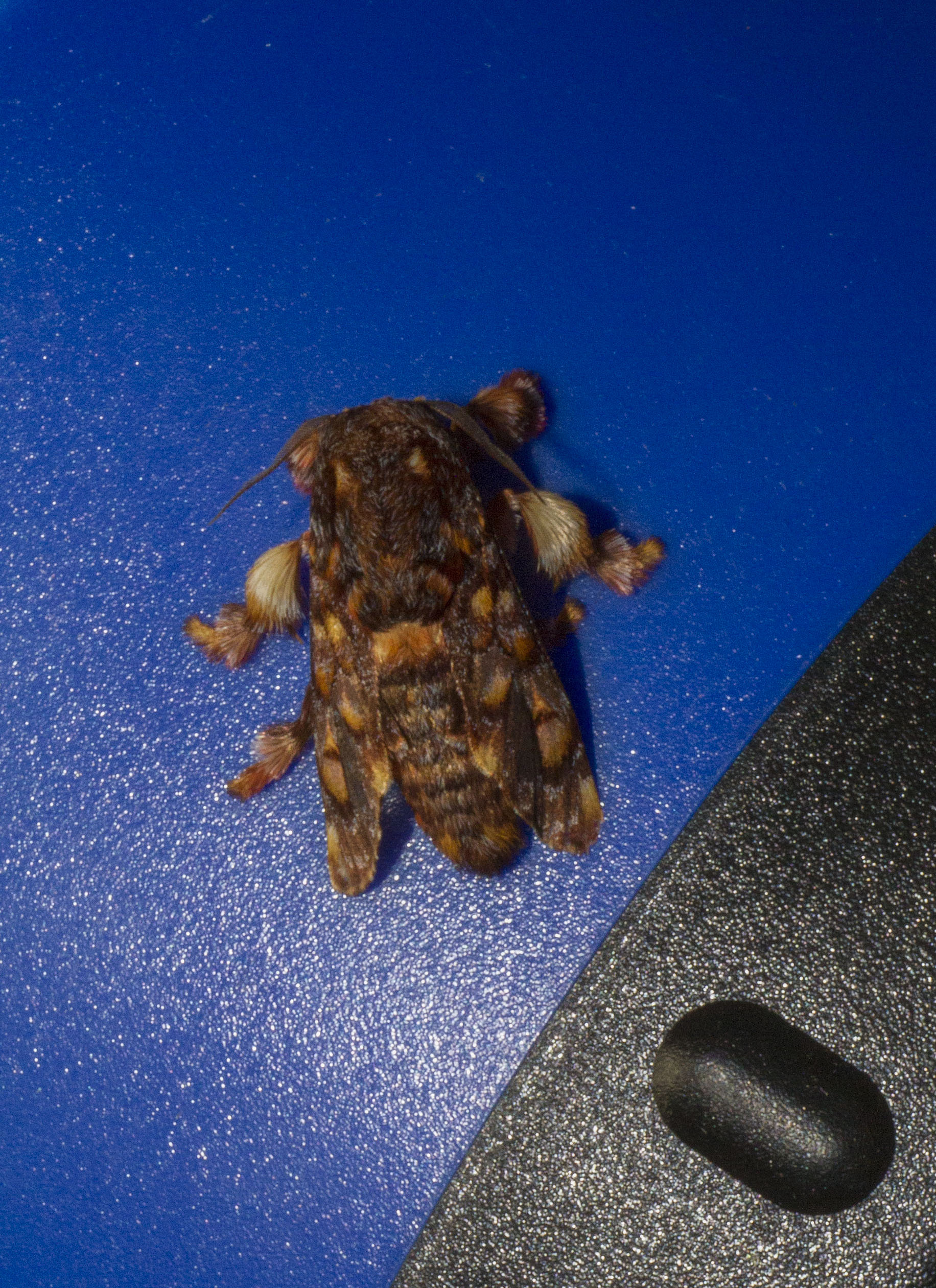

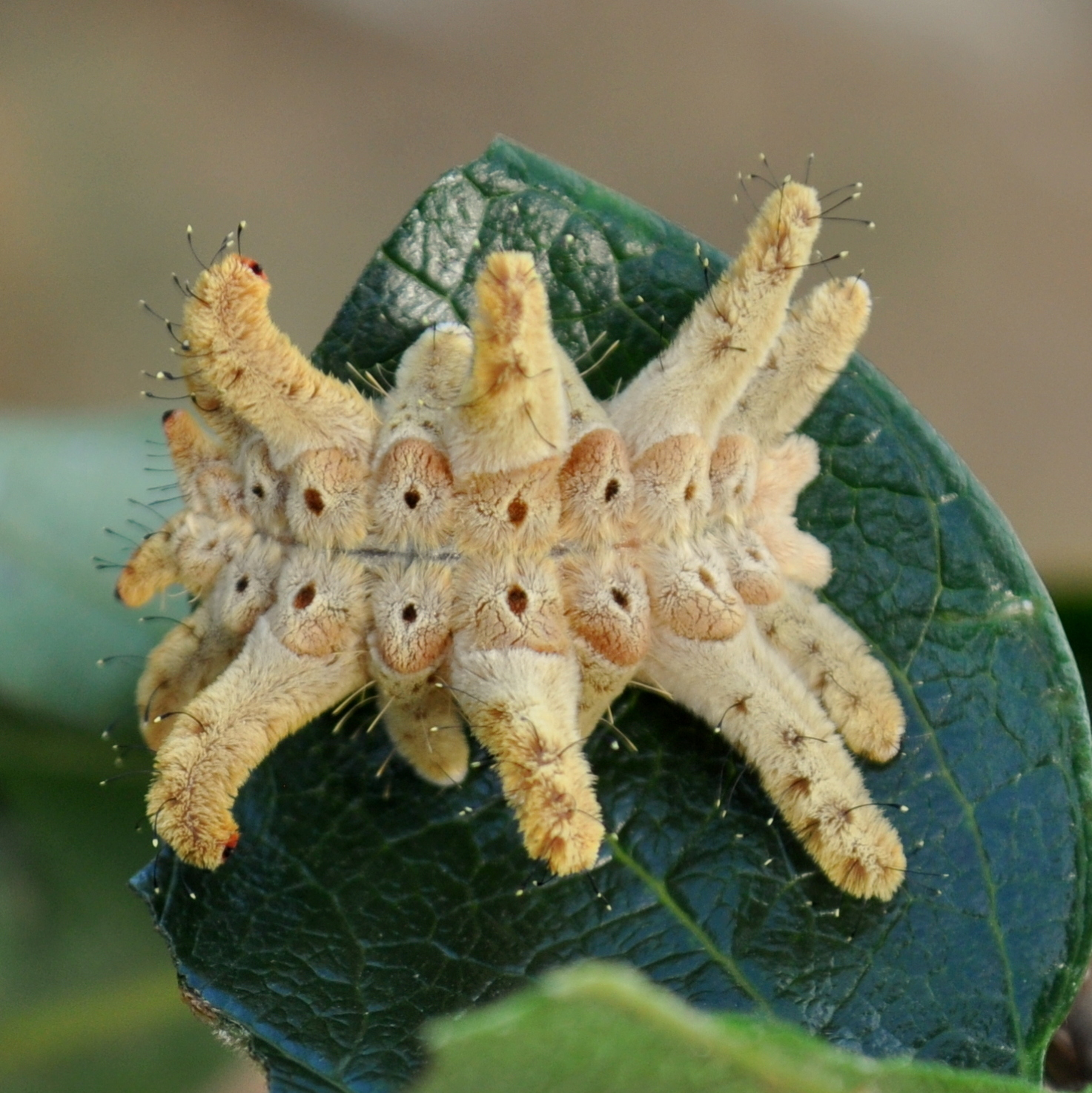

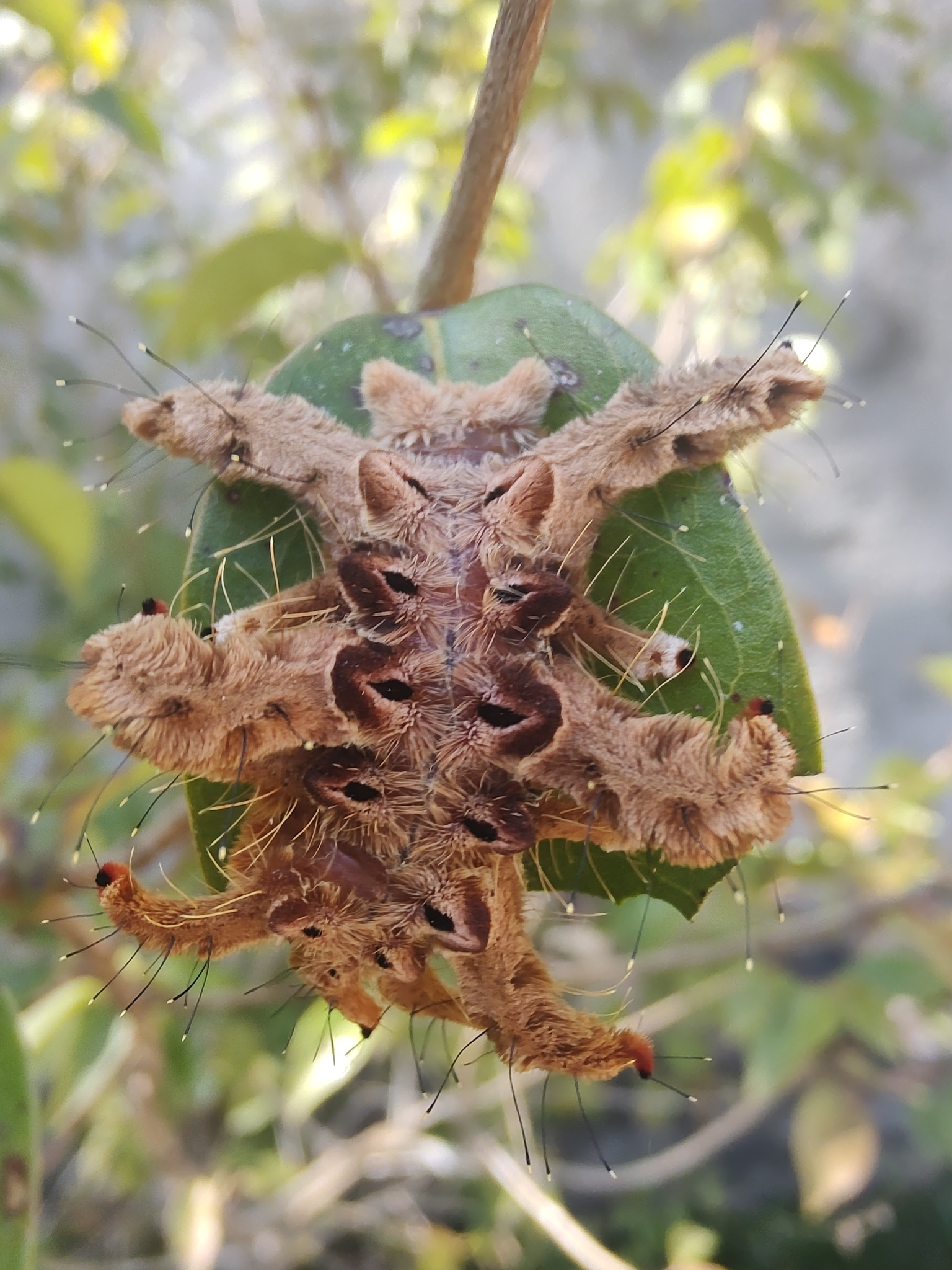

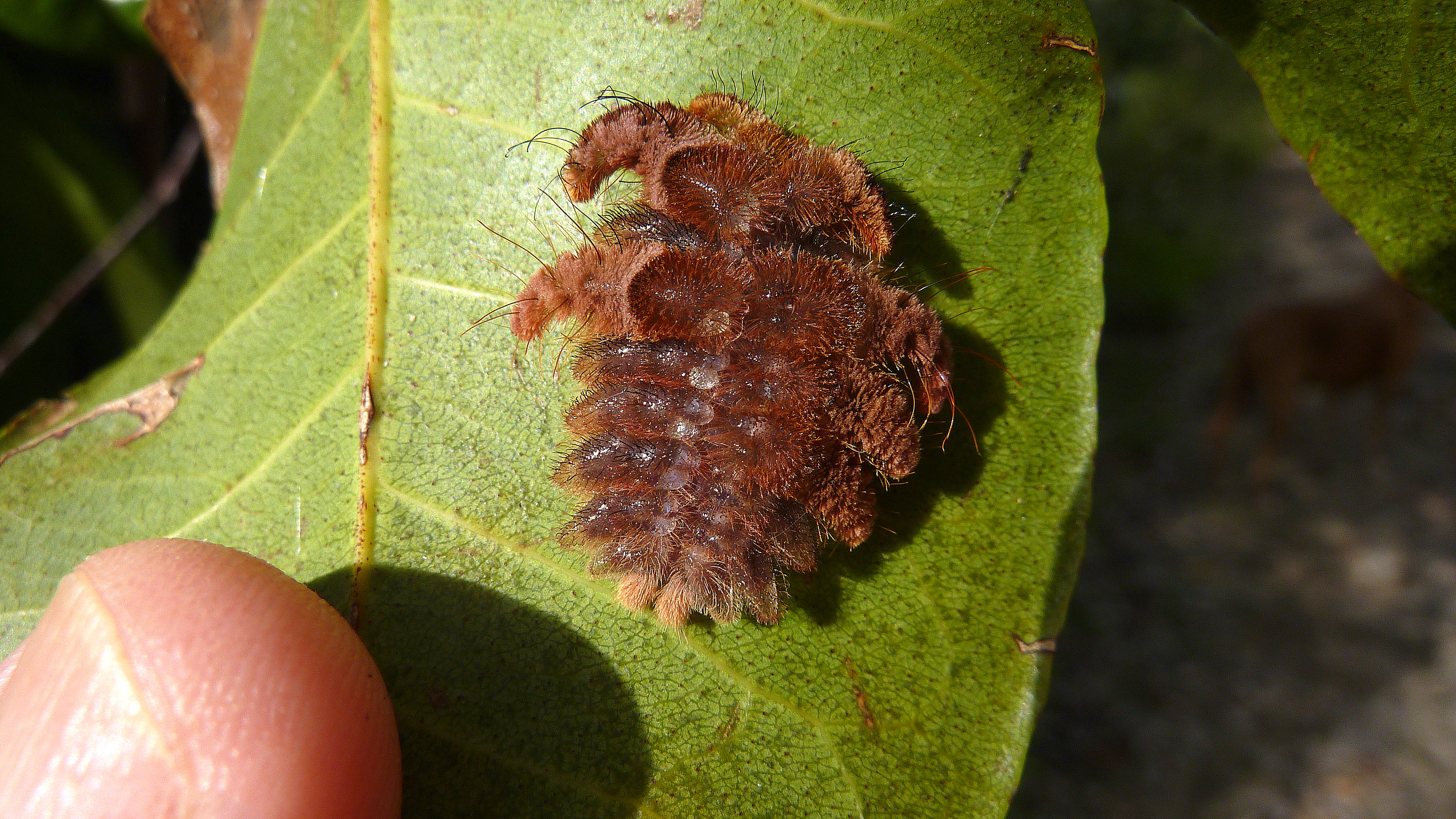

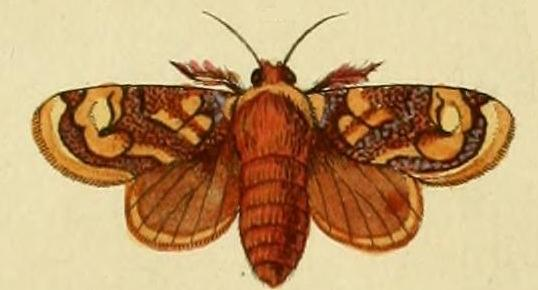

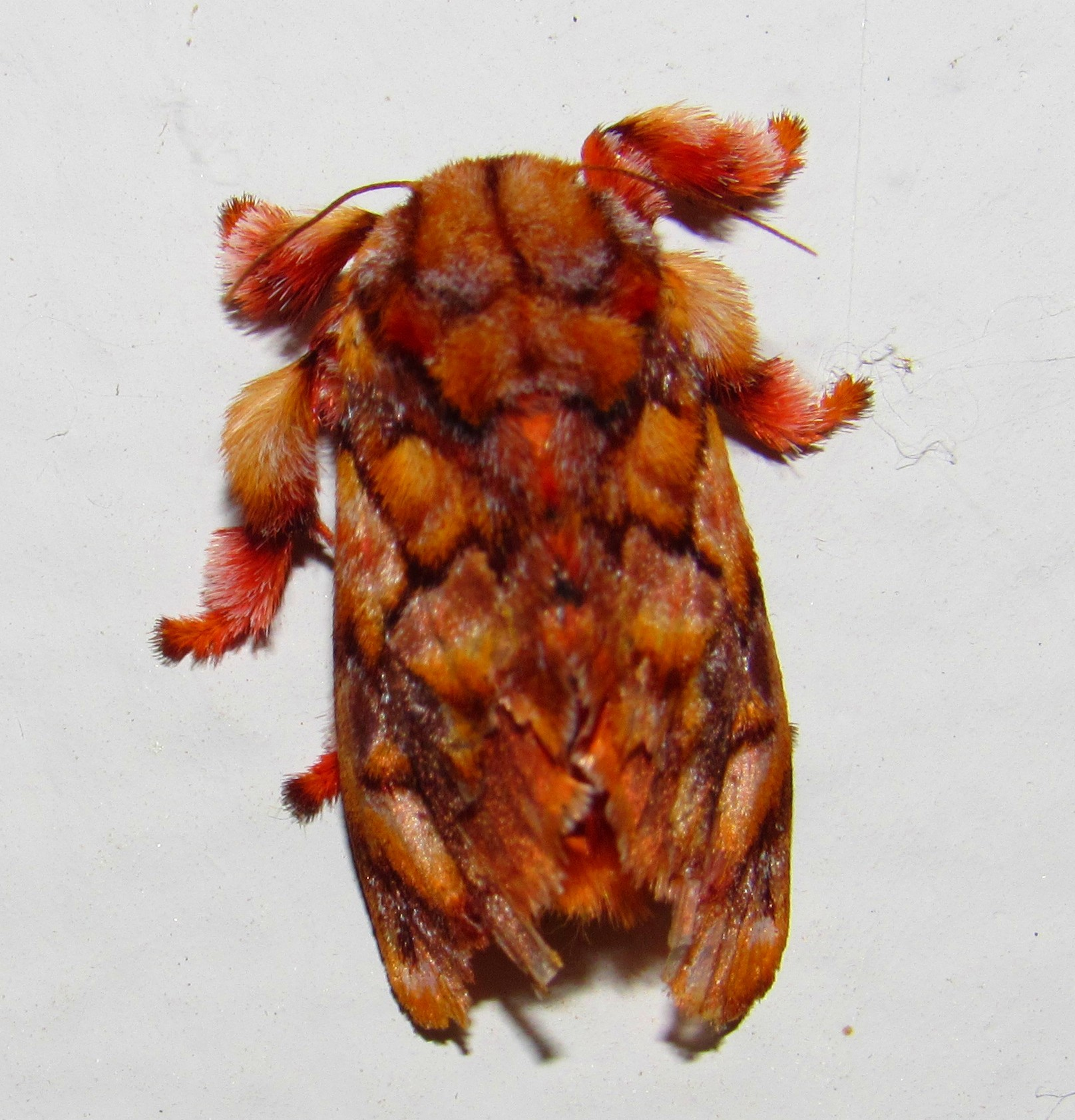
