= Latoia albicosta =

Scientific classification
- Kingdom: Animalia
- Phylum: Arthropoda
- Class: Insecta
- Order: Lepidoptera
- Family: Limacodidae
- Genus: Latoia
- Species: L. albicosta

Binomial name
- Latoia albicosta (Hampson, 1910)

Species of moth

Latoia albicosta, also known as white edged latoia, is a moth in the genus Latoia in the family Limacodidae.

== Distribution ==
Latoia albicosta occurs in the Democratic Republic of the Congo, Kenya, Malawi, Mozambique, South Africa, Tanzania, Uganda, Zambia and Zimbabwe.

== Larval foodplants ==
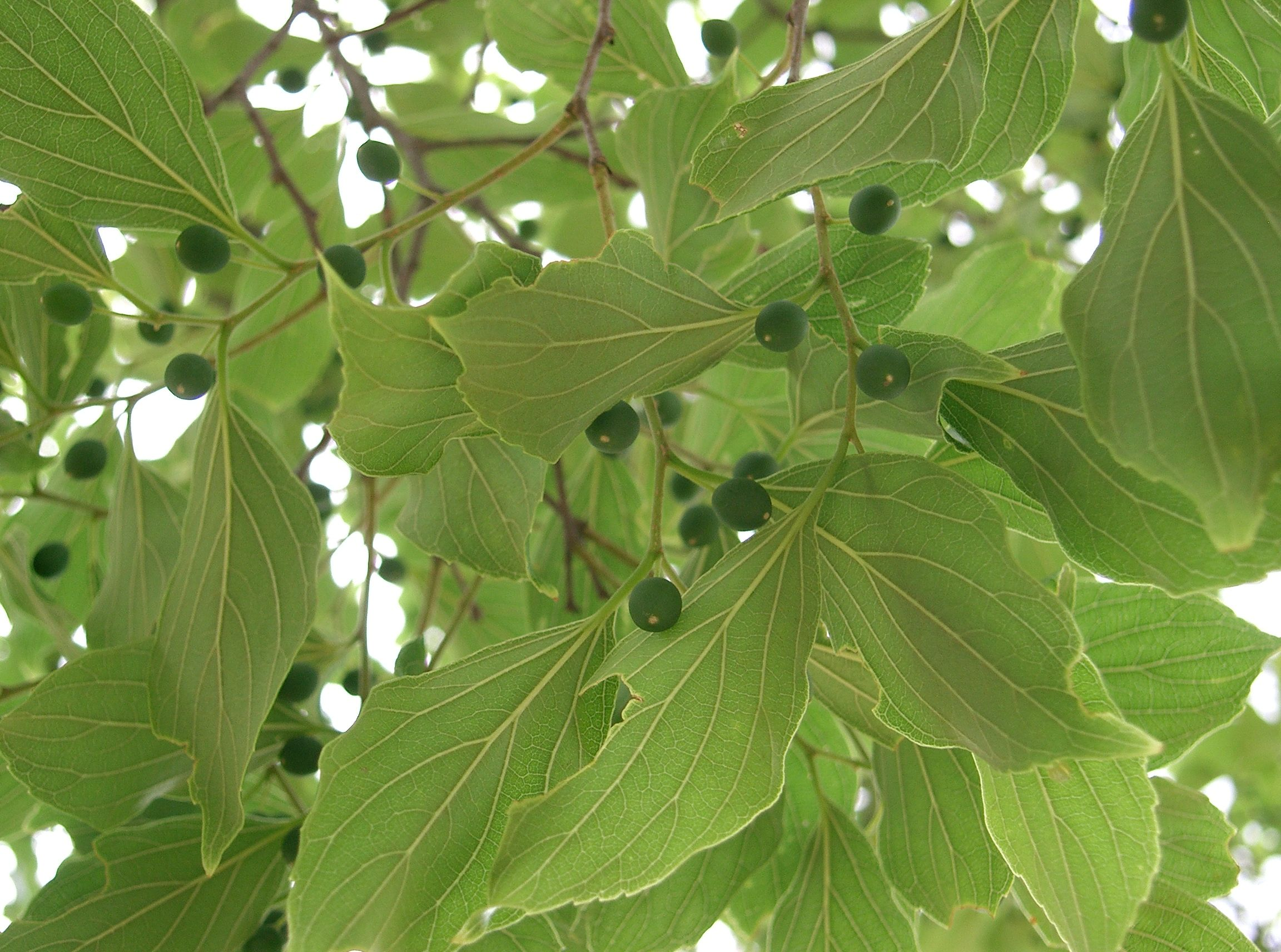
Celtis sinensis

The larval foodplant of L. albicosta is Celtis.
