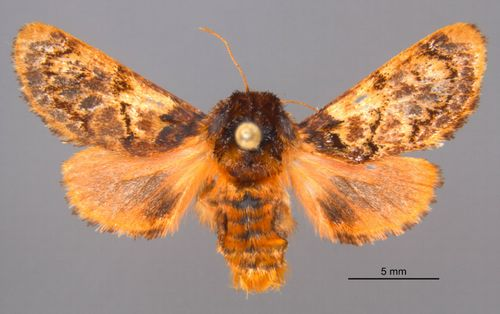

Scientific classification
- Domain: Eukaryota
- Kingdom: Animalia
- Phylum: Arthropoda
- Class: Insecta
- Order: Lepidoptera
- Family: Limacodidae
- Genus: Phobetron
- Species: P. dyari

Binomial name
- Phobetron dyari (Barnes & Benjamin, 1926)

= Phobetron dyari =

Species of insect

Phobetron dyari is a species of slug caterpillar moths in the genus Phobetron and the family Limacodidae.

It was identified by American entomologists William Barnes and Benjamin Dann Walsh in 1926.
