= Latoia albifrons =

Scientific classification
- Domain: Eukaryota
- Kingdom: Animalia
- Phylum: Arthropoda
- Class: Insecta
- Order: Lepidoptera
- Family: Limacodidae
- Genus: Latoia
- Species: L. albifrons

Binomial name
- Latoia albifrons Guérin-Méneville, 1844

Synonyms
- Nyssia florifera Herrich-Schäffer, 1854

Species of moth

Latoia albifrons is a species of moth in the family Limacodidae. It is found in Malawi and Madagascar.
