= Pseudaltha atramentifera =

Scientific classification
- Domain: Eukaryota
- Kingdom: Animalia
- Phylum: Arthropoda
- Class: Insecta
- Order: Lepidoptera
- Family: Limacodidae
- Genus: Pseudaltha
- Species: P. atramentifera

Binomial name
- Pseudaltha atramentifera Hering, 1931

Species of moth

Pseudaltha atramentifera is a species of moth of the family Limacodidae. It is found in India (including the Khasi Hills).
