= Pseudiragoides itsova =

Scientific classification
- Kingdom: Animalia
- Phylum: Arthropoda
- Clade: Pancrustacea
- Class: Insecta
- Order: Lepidoptera
- Family: Limacodidae
- Genus: Pseudiragoides
- Species: P. itsova

Binomial name
- Pseudiragoides itsova Solovyev & Witt, 2011

Species of moth

Pseudiragoides itsova is a species of moth of the family Limacodidae. It is found in China (Guangxi, Fujian, Hunan and Zhejiang) at altitudes between 1,200 and 2,300 meters.

The length of the forewings is 13–15 mm for males. They have a wingspan of 28–33 mm.
