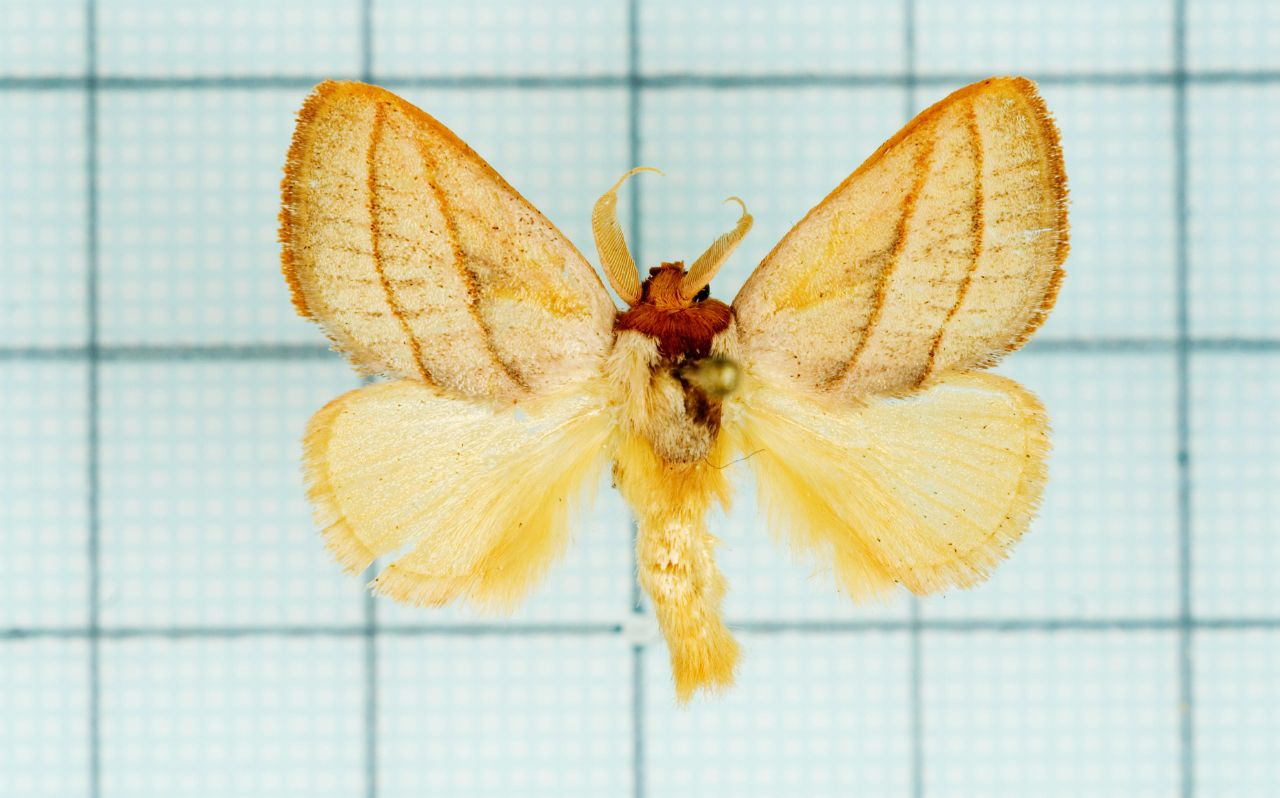

Scientific classification
- Kingdom: Animalia
- Phylum: Arthropoda
- Class: Insecta
- Order: Lepidoptera
- Family: Limacodidae
- Genus: Cania
- Species: C. heppneri

Binomial name
- Cania heppneri Inoue, 1992

= Cania heppneri =

Species of moth

Cania heppneri is a moth of the family Limacodidae. It is endemic to Taiwan.
