= Hyphorma flaviceps =

Scientific classification
- Kingdom: Animalia
- Phylum: Arthropoda
- Class: Insecta
- Order: Lepidoptera
- Family: Limacodidae
- Genus: Hyphorma
- Species: H. flaviceps

Binomial name
- Hyphorma flaviceps (Hampson, 1910)

Synonyms
- Thosea flaviceps Hampson, 1910; Susica flaviceps; Monema tenebricosa Hering, 1931

Species of moth

Hyphorma flaviceps is a moth of the family Limacodidae. It is found in India and Vietnam.
