= Mambara =

Scientific classification
- Kingdom: Animalia
- Phylum: Arthropoda
- Class: Insecta
- Order: Lepidoptera
- Family: Limacodidae
- Genus: Mambara; Bethune-Baker, 1908

Butterfly genus in family Lycaenidae

Mambara is a genus of butterflies in the family Limacodidae. It is distributed in New Guinea and Australia.

== Species ==
The following ten species are recognized:

- Mambara andamanensis (Mondal & Rynth, 1971)
- Mambara conspicua Hering, 1931
- Mambara delocrossa (Turner, 1906)
- Mambara dubia Bethune-Baker, 1910
- Mambara haplopis (Turner, 1906)
- Mambara inconspicua Bethune-Baker, 1908
- Mambara minimalis (van Eecke, 1924)
- Mambara pallens Bethune-Baker, 1910
- Mambara robiginosa Hering, 1931
- Mambara rosselensis Hering, 1931
