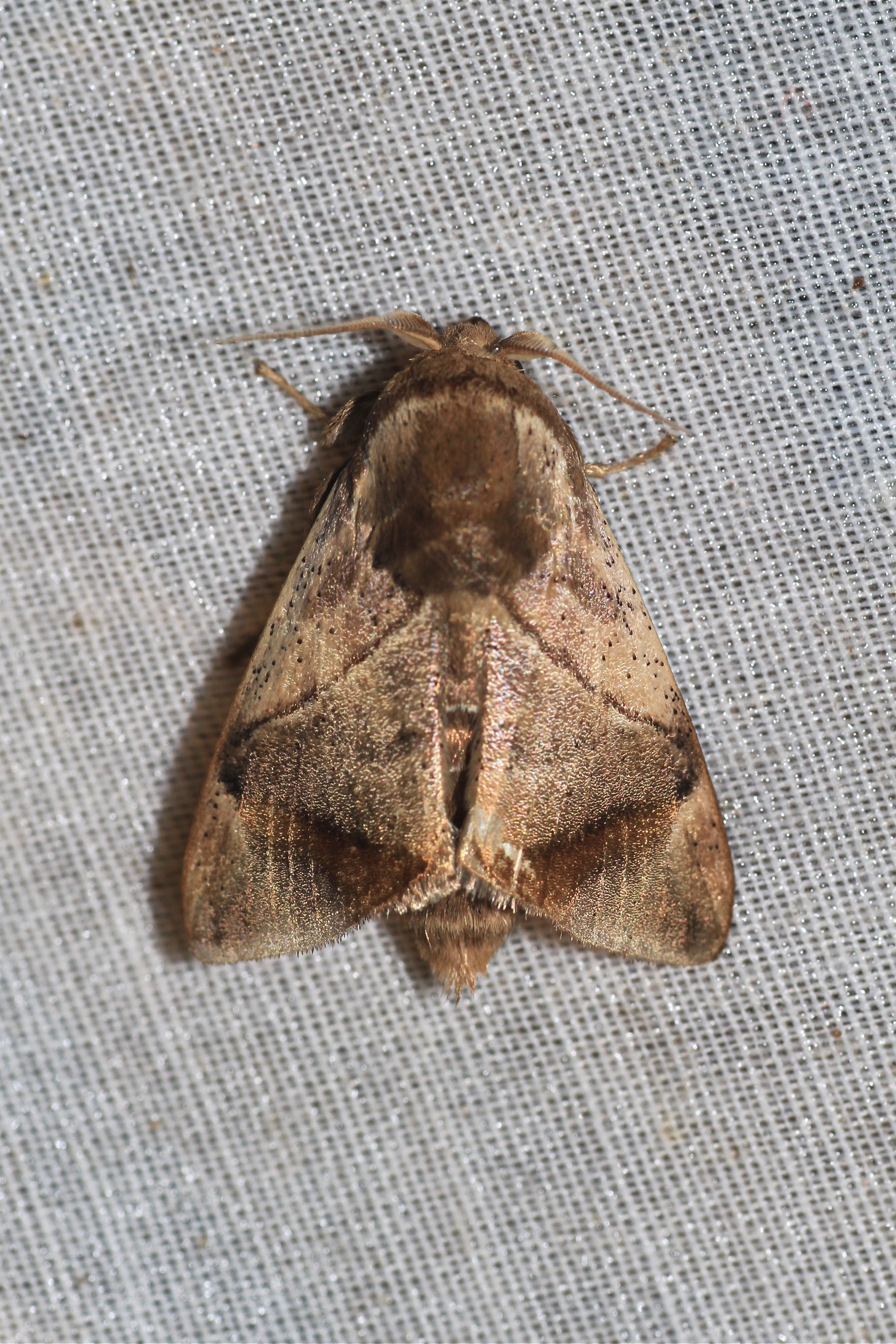
- Setora cupreiplaga

Scientific classification
- Kingdom: Animalia
- Phylum: Arthropoda
- Class: Insecta
- Order: Lepidoptera
- Family: Limacodidae
- Subfamily: Limacodinae
- Genus: Setora; Walker, 1855

= Setora =

Genus of moths

Setora is a genus of moths of the family Limacodidae first described by Francis Walker in 1855.

== Species ==
- Setora baibarana
- Setora cupreiplaga
- Setora cupreistriga
- Setora hampsoni
- Setora kwangtungensis
- Setora mongolica
- Setora neutra
- Setora nitens
- Setora postornata
- Setora rudis
- Setora sinensis
- Setora suberecta
- Setora tamsi
