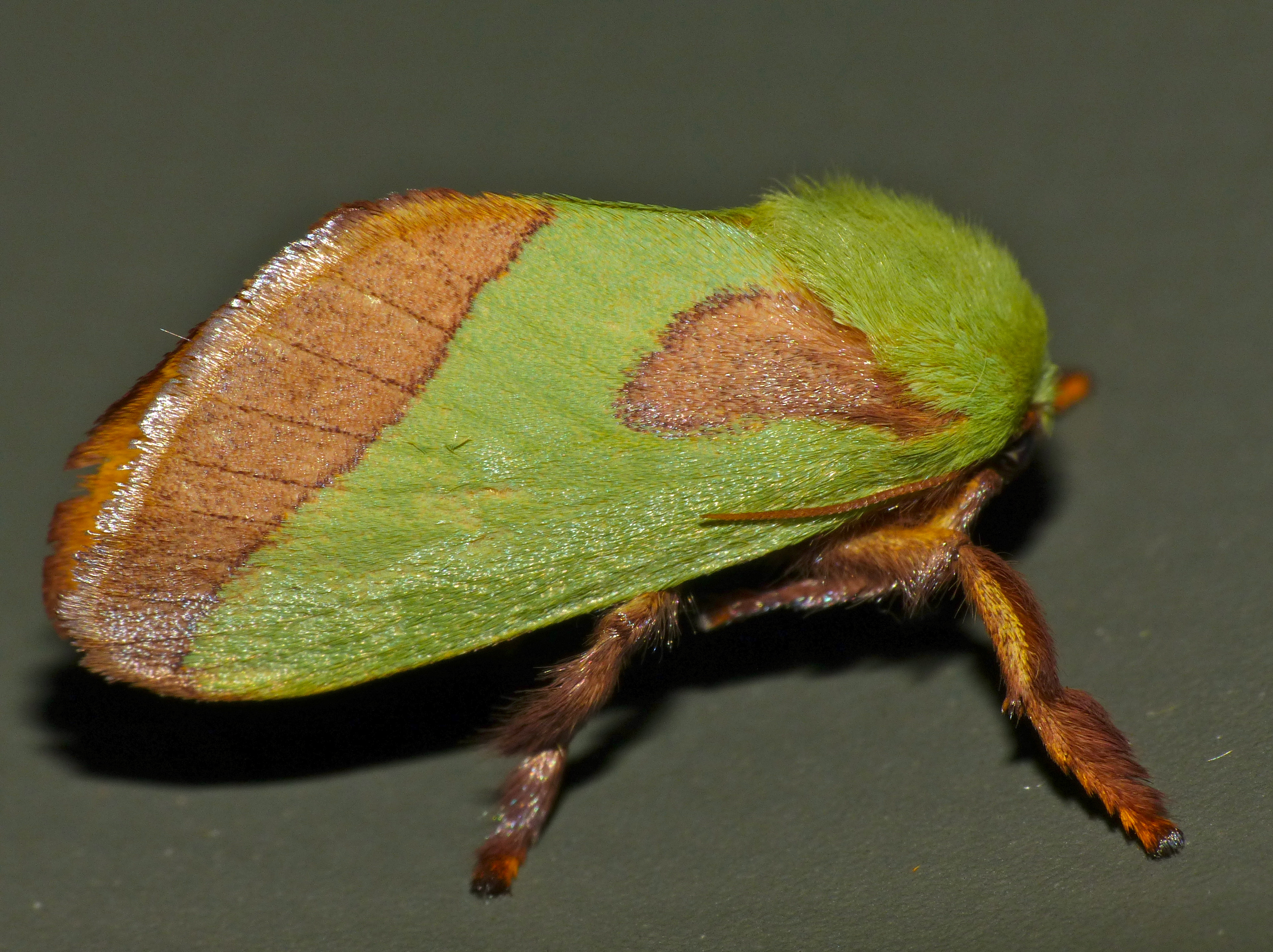
- Plum Slug Moth (L. latistriga)

Scientific classification
- Domain: Eukaryota
- Kingdom: Animalia
- Phylum: Arthropoda
- Class: Insecta
- Order: Lepidoptera
- Family: Limacodidae
- Subfamily: Limacodinae
- Genus: Latoia; Guérin-Méneville, 1844

Synonyms
- Asteria Felder, 1874; Euphaga Guenée, 1865; Lemuriostroter Hering, 1957; Somara Walker, 1855

= Latoia =

Genus of moths

Latoia is a genus of moths in the family Limacodidae. It was first described by Félix Édouard Guérin-Méneville in 1844.

== Species ==
Some species of this genus are:

- Latoia albicosta (Hampson, 1910)
- Latoia albifrons Guérin-Méneville, 1844
- Latoia albilinea (Hampson, 1910)
- Latoia anagaura Janse, 1964
- Latoia canescens (Walker, 1855)
- Latoia catalai Viette, 1980
- Latoia chlorea Berio, 1939
- Latoia chrysopa D. S. Fletcher, 1968
- Latoia cineracea (Karsch, 1896)
- Latoia cinnamomarea D. S. Fletcher, 1968
- Latoia colini (Mabille, 1884)
- Latoia cretata (Karsch, 1899)
- Latoia decolor (Karsch, 1899)
- Latoia eremotropha Janse, 1964
- Latoia flavicosta (Hampson, 1910)
- Latoia geminatus (Hering, 1957)
- Latoia heringi (Viette, 1965)
- Latoia heringiana Viette, 1980
- Latoia johannes (Distant, 1898)
- Latoia joiceyi Tams, 1929
- Latoia latistriga (Walker, 1855)
- Latoia lemuriensis (Viette, 1967)
- Latoia loxotoma (Bethune-Baker, 1911)
- Latoia lutunguru Dufrane, 1945
- Latoia nana Holland, 1893
- Latoia neglecta Hering, 1928
- Latoia nivosa (Felder, 1874)
- Latoia parniodes Hering, 1957
- Latoia peyrierasi (Viette, 1965)
- Latoia phlebodes (Karsch, 1896)
- Latoia picta (Walker, 1855)
- Latoia privativa Hering, 1928
- Latoia procerus (Hering, 1957)
- Latoia pumilus (Hering, 1957)
- Latoia singularis (Butler, 1878)
- Latoia urda (Druce, 1887)
- Latoia vadoni Viette, 1980
- Latoia viettei (Hering, 1957)
- Latoia viridicosta (Hampson, 1910)
- Latoia viridifascia Holland, 1893
- Latoia viridimixta Janse, 1964
- Latoia vitilena (Karsch, 1896)
- Latoia vivida (Walker, 1865)
