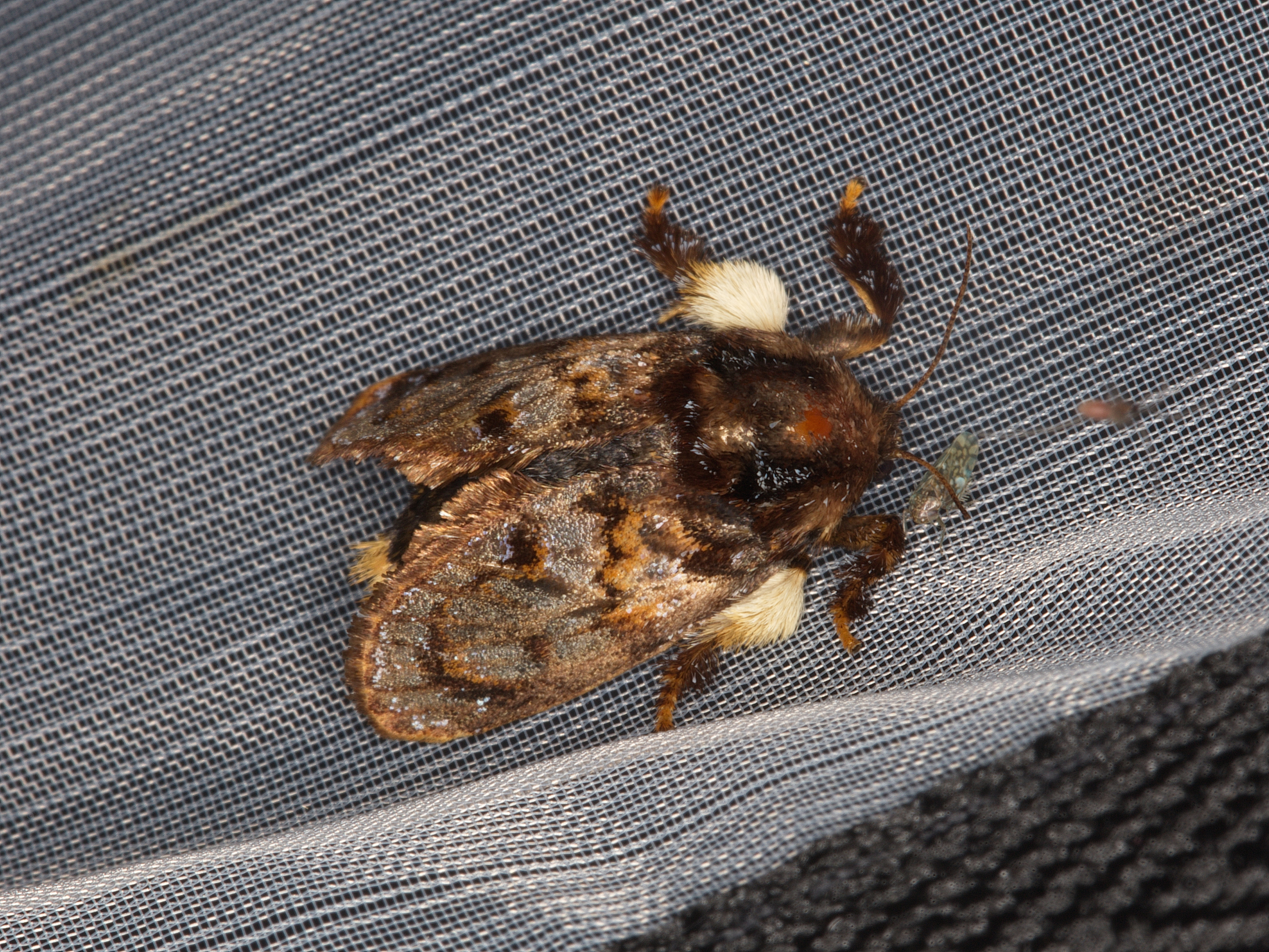
- Phobetron pithecium, hag moth

Scientific classification
- Kingdom: Animalia
- Phylum: Arthropoda
- Clade: Pancrustacea
- Class: Insecta
- Order: Lepidoptera
- Family: Limacodidae
- Genus: Phobetron; Hübner, 1825

= Phobetron =

Genus of moths

Phobetron is a genus of slug caterpillar moths in the family Limacodidae. There are at least four described species in Phobetron, found in North, Central, and South America.

== Species ==
These four species belong to the genus Phobetron:

- Phobetron cypris
- Phobetron dyari Barnes & Benjamin, 1926
- Phobetron hipparchia Cramer, 1777
- Phobetron pithecium (J. E. Smith) (hag moth)
