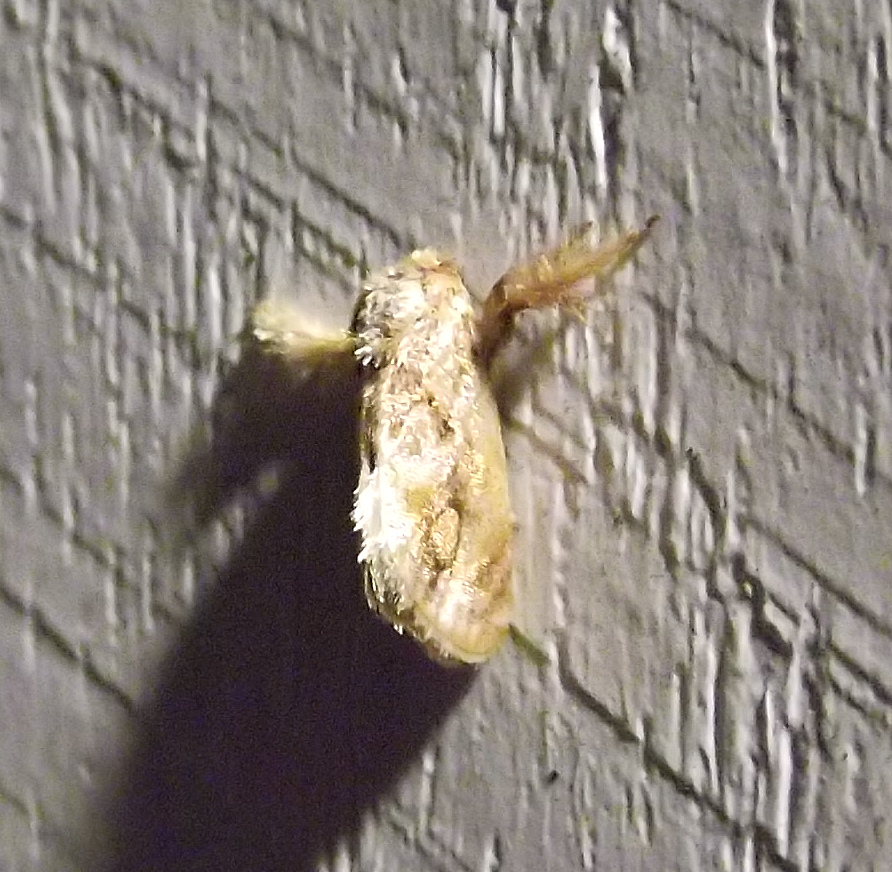
- Spun Glass Slug Moth (Isochaetes beutenmuelleri)

Scientific classification
- Domain: Eukaryota
- Kingdom: Animalia
- Phylum: Arthropoda
- Class: Insecta
- Order: Lepidoptera
- Family: Limacodidae
- Genus: Isochaetes; Dyar, 1899

Species
- See text

= Isochaetes =

Genus of moths

Isochaetes is a genus of Limacodid moths.

== Selected species ==
- Isochaetes beutenmuelleri (H. Edwards, 1889)
- Isochaetes dwagsi Corrales & Epstein, 2004
- Isochaetes heevansi Epstein, 2004
- Isochaetes kenjii Corrales & Epstein, 2004
- Isochaetes tapantiensis Corrales & Epstein, 2004
