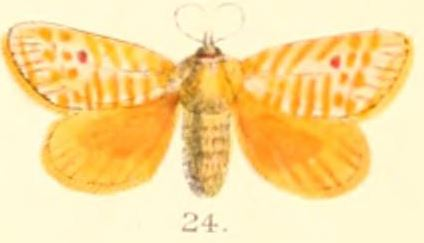
- Demonarosa rufotessellata

Scientific classification
- Domain: Eukaryota
- Kingdom: Animalia
- Phylum: Arthropoda
- Class: Insecta
- Order: Lepidoptera
- Family: Limacodidae
- Genus: Demonarosa; Matsumura, 1931

Type species
- Demonarosa rosea Matsumura, 1931 (=syn. of Demonarosa rufotesselata)

Synonyms
- Natarosa Hering, 1931; Arbelarosa Hering, 1931

= Demonarosa =

Genus of moths

Demonarosa is a genus of moths in the family Limacodidae from Asia.

== Species ==
- Demonarosa diagonalis (Holloway, 1982) (from Borneo, Peninsular Malaysia, Sumatra, Brunei)
- Demonarosa mediodorsata (Hering, 1931) (from Sundaland: Brunei, Sarawak)
- Demonarosa nocturnignis Holloway, 1990 (from Sumatra)
- Demonarosa ochrirubra (Holloway, 1976) (from Borneo)
- Demonarosa rufotessellata (Moore, 1879) (from Borneo, India, Laos, Vietnam, Philippines)
  - Demonarosa rufotessellata subrosea (Wileman, 1915) (from Taiwan)
  - Demonarosa rufotessellata issiki (Kawazoe & Ogata, 1962) (from Japan)
