= Contheyla =

Scientific classification
- Kingdom: Animalia
- Phylum: Arthropoda
- Class: Insecta
- Order: Lepidoptera
- Family: Limacodidae
- Genus: Contheyla; Walker, 1865

Type species
- Contheyla vestita Walker, 1865

Genus of moths

Contheyla is a genus of moths in the family Limacodidae.

== Species ==
- Contheyla brunnea Swinhoe, 1904
- Contheyla lola Swinhoe, 1904
- Contheyla vestita Walker, 1865
