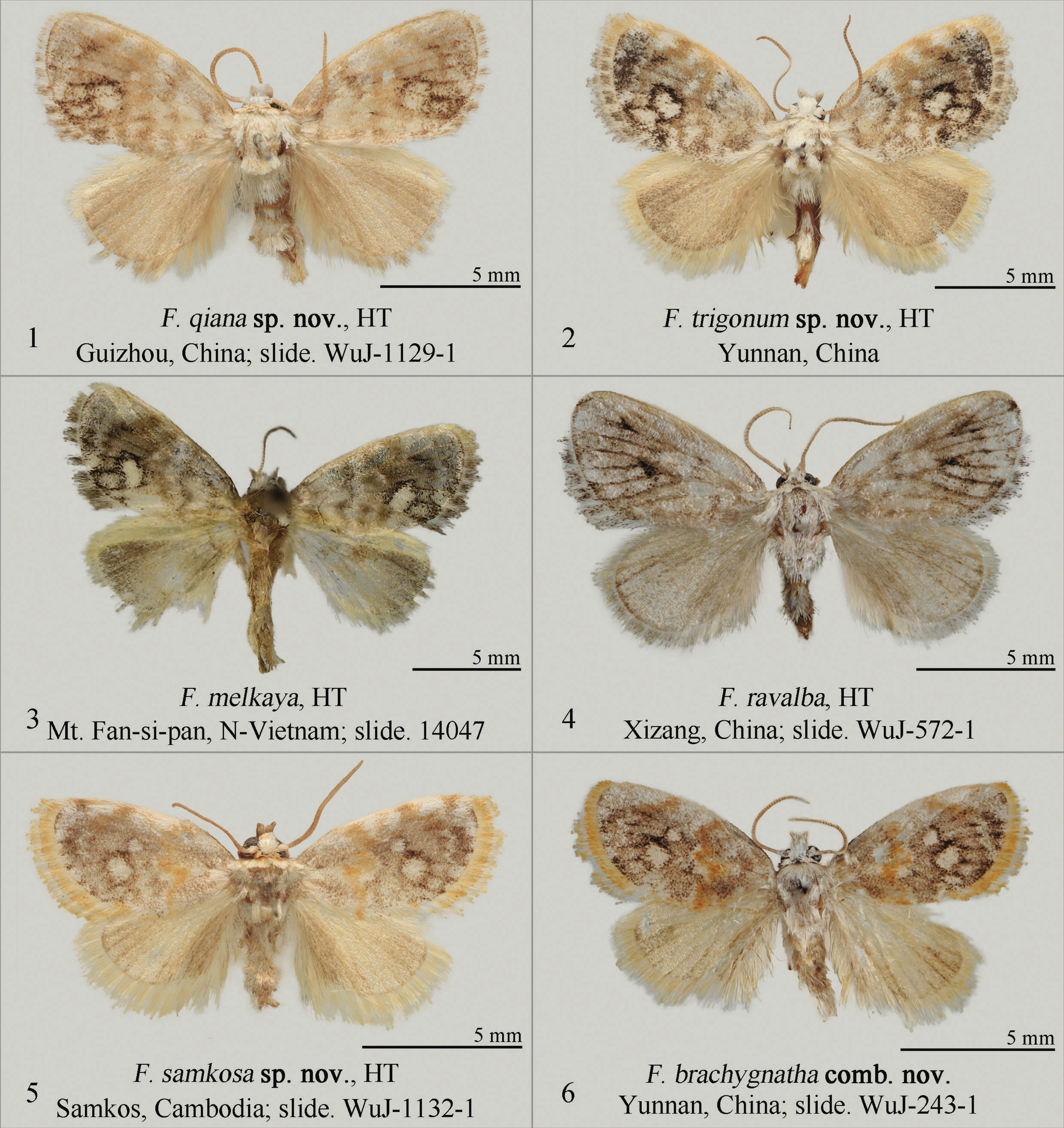
- Fignya species

Scientific classification
- Kingdom: Animalia
- Phylum: Arthropoda
- Clade: Pancrustacea
- Class: Insecta
- Order: Lepidoptera
- Family: Limacodidae
- Genus: Fignya; Solovyev & Witt, 2009

Species
- See text.

= Fignya =

Genus of moths

Fignya is a small genus of moths in the family Limacodidae, first described in 2009.

== Description ==
Species in the genus Fignya are small; typical male wing-spans are in the range 14–18 mm (0.6–0.7 in). Both males and females have thread-like antennae. There is a large brown-bordered white spot on the forewing in the cubitus area. The shape of the male genitalia is diagnostic between species.

== Species ==
As of 2024, six species were accepted, all from China, Cambodia and Vietnam:

- Fignya brachygnatha (Wu & Fang, 2008)
- Fignya melkaya Solovyev & Witt, 2009
- Fignya qiana Wu & Han, 2024
- Fignya ravalba Wu, Solovyev & Han, 2022
- Fignya samkosa Wu & Han, 2024
- Fignya trigonum Wu & Han, 2024
