= Barilla transversata =

Scientific classification
- Kingdom: Animalia
- Phylum: Arthropoda
- Clade: Pancrustacea
- Class: Insecta
- Order: Lepidoptera
- Family: Limacodidae
- Genus: Barilla; Dyar, 1900
- Species: B. transversata

Binomial name
- Barilla transversata (Holland, 1893)

Synonyms
- Miresa transversata Holland, 1893

Species of moth

Barilla transversata is a species of moth in the family Limacodidae. It was described by William Jacob Holland in 1893. This species has been documented in countries along the Bight of Biafra including Cameroon, Congo, Equatorial Guinea, Gabon, Ghana, and Nigeria. It is the only species in the genus Barilla.
