= Spatulifimbria =

Scientific classification
- Kingdom: Animalia
- Phylum: Arthropoda
- Class: Insecta
- Order: Lepidoptera
- Family: Limacodidae
- Subfamily: Limacodinae
- Genus: Spatulifimbria; Hampson, 1893

Type species
- Spatulifimbria castaneiceps Hampson, 1892

Synonyms
- Spatulicraspeda Hampson, 1893

Genus of stinging cup moths

Spatulifimbria is a genus of stinging cup moths described by George Hampson in 1893.

== Species ==
There are currently two species:

- Spatulifimbria castaneiceps Hampson, 1892
- Spatulifimbria grisea Hering, 1935
