= Hyphorma =

Scientific classification
- Kingdom: Animalia
- Phylum: Arthropoda
- Class: Insecta
- Order: Lepidoptera
- Family: Limacodidae
- Genus: Hyphorma; Walker, 1865

Genus of moths

Hyphorma is a genus of moths of the family Limacodidae.

== Species ==
- Hyphorma avanta Solovyev & Witt, 2009
- Hyphorma capucina (Snellen, 1900)
- Hyphorma flaviceps (Hampson, 1910)
- Hyphorma margaritacea Hering, 1931 in Seitz
- Hyphorma minax Walker, 1865
- Hyphorma minor de Joannis, 1930
- Hyphorma sericea Leech, 1899
