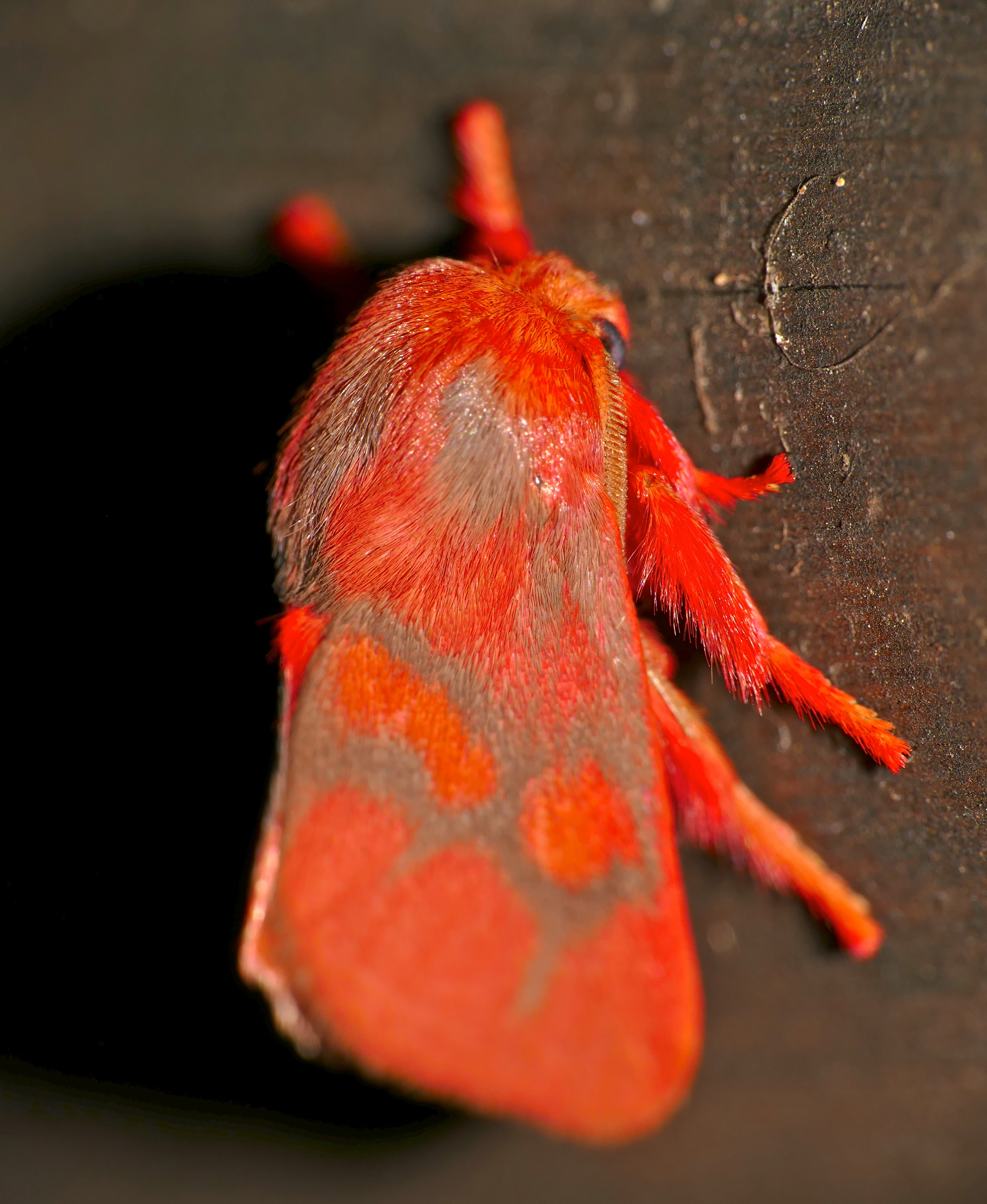

Scientific classification
- Kingdom: Animalia
- Phylum: Arthropoda
- Class: Insecta
- Order: Lepidoptera
- Family: Limacodidae
- Genus: Micraphe
- Species: M. lateritia

Binomial name
- Micraphe lateritia Karsch, 1896

= Micraphe =

Species of moths

Micraphe is a monotypic genus of moths in the family Limacodidae. It contains a single species, M. lateritia, the rosy slug.

== Distribution ==
Micraphe lateritia occurs in Central and Southern Africa.
