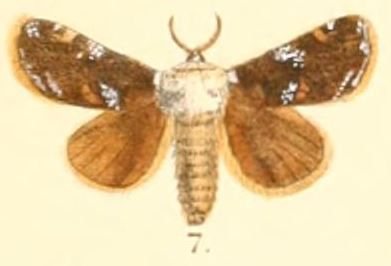
- Belippa thoracica

Scientific classification
- Domain: Eukaryota
- Kingdom: Animalia
- Phylum: Arthropoda
- Class: Insecta
- Order: Lepidoptera
- Family: Limacodidae
- Genus: Belippa; Walker, 1865

= Belippa =

Genus of moths

Belippa is a genus of moths in the family Limacodidae erected by Francis Walker in 1865.

== Description ==
Antennae with proximal one-third is bipectinated in males, whereas ciliated in females. Palpi reaching vertex of head. Hind tibia with two pairs of spurs. Forewing with vein 7, 8 and 9 stalked. Hindwing with veins 6 and 7 from the cell.

== Species ==
- Belippa aeolus Solovyev & Witt, 2009 (Vietnam)
- Belippa apicata Moore (India)
- Belippa boninensis (Matsumura, 1931) (Japan)
- Belippa cyanopasta Hampson, 1910 (Myanmar)
- Belippa ferruginea Moore 1877 (India)
- Belippa formosaensis Kawada, 1930
- Belippa horrida Walker, 1865 (China, Japan, Taiwan)
- Belippa lohor Moore (India, Java)
- Belippa ochreata Yoshimoto, 1994 (India, China)
- Belippa thoracica Moore, 1879 (India)
