= Pseudaltha =

Scientific classification
- Domain: Eukaryota
- Kingdom: Animalia
- Phylum: Arthropoda
- Class: Insecta
- Order: Lepidoptera
- Family: Limacodidae
- Genus: Pseudaltha; Hering, 1931

Genus of moths

Pseudaltha is a genus of moths of the family Limacodidae.

== Species ==
- Pseudaltha atramentifera Hering, 1931
- Pseudaltha eboris Solovyev, 2009
- Pseudaltha sapa Solovyev, 2009
