= Ximacodes =

Scientific classification
- Domain: Eukaryota
- Kingdom: Animalia
- Phylum: Arthropoda
- Class: Insecta
- Order: Lepidoptera
- Family: Limacodidae
- Subfamily: Limacodinae
- Genus: Ximacodes; Viette, 1980

Type species
- Pseudolatoia subrufa Hering, 1957

Genus of moths

Ximacodes is a genus of moths in the family Limacodidae.

All species of this genus are only known from Madagascar but Ximacodes pyrosoma is also found in Tanzania.

== Species ==
Some species of this genus are:

- Ximacodes affinis (Mabille, 1890)
- Ximacodes malagasy Viette, 1980
- Ximacodes pyrosoma (Butler, 1882)
- Ximacodes subrufa (Hering, 1957)
