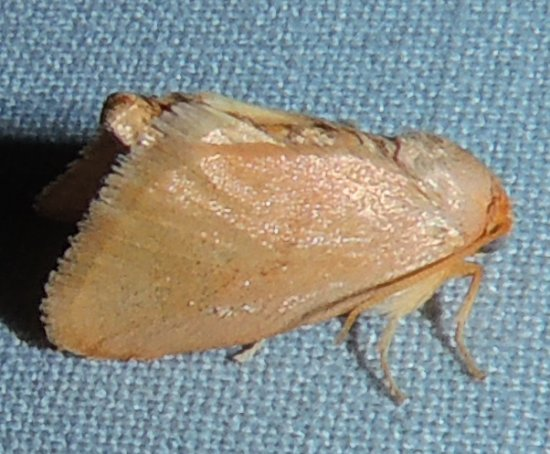

Scientific classification
- Domain: Eukaryota
- Kingdom: Animalia
- Phylum: Arthropoda
- Class: Insecta
- Order: Lepidoptera
- Family: Limacodidae
- Genus: Tortricidia
- Species: T. pallida

Binomial name
- Tortricidia pallida (Herrich-Schäffer, 1854)

Synonyms
- Limacodes pallida Herrich-Schäffer, 1854; Limacodes pallida flavula Herrich-Schäffer, 1854; Tortricidia pallida flavula

= Tortricidia pallida =

Species of moth

Tortricidia pallida, the red-crossed button slug, is a moth of the family Limacodidae described by Gottlieb August Wilhelm Herrich-Schäffer in 1854. It is found in eastern North America from Nova Scotia west to Minnesota and south to Louisiana.

The larvae feed on the leaves of many different types of shrubs and trees including beech, cherry, oak and willow.
