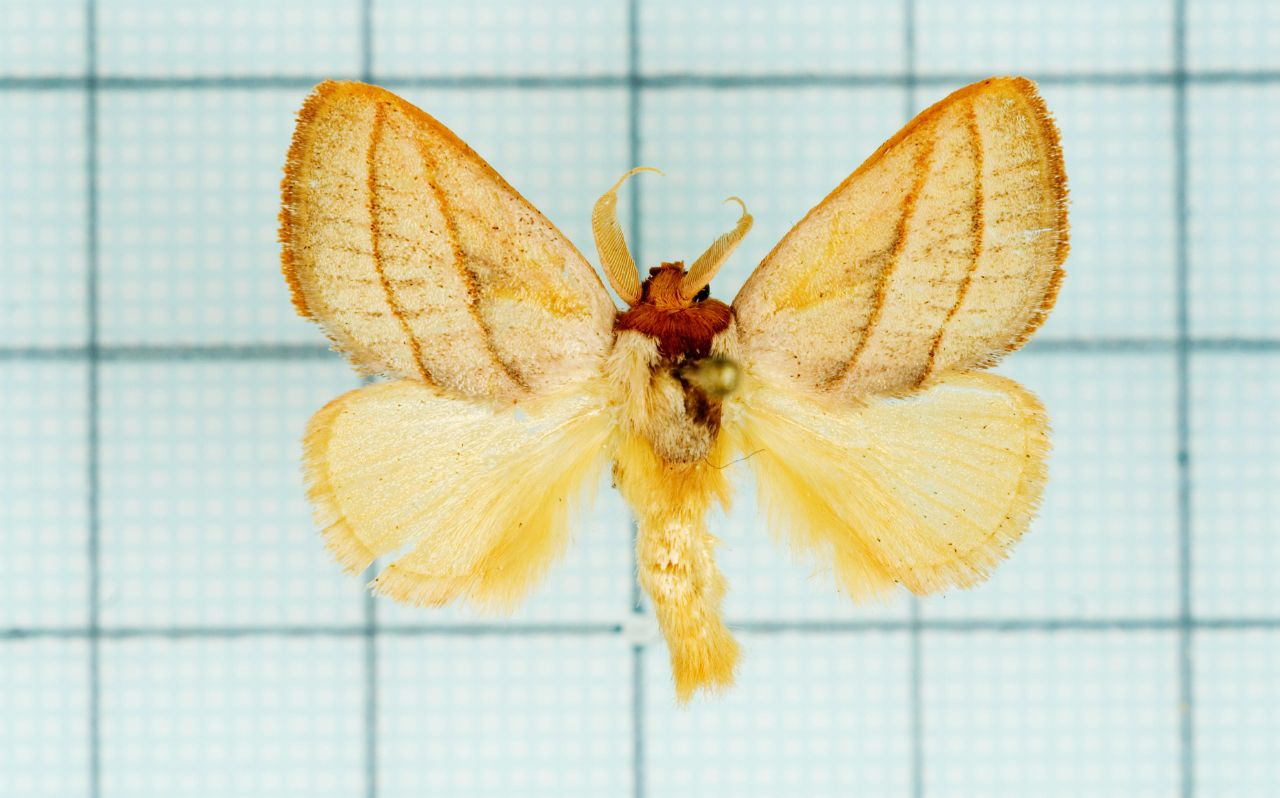
- Cania heppneri
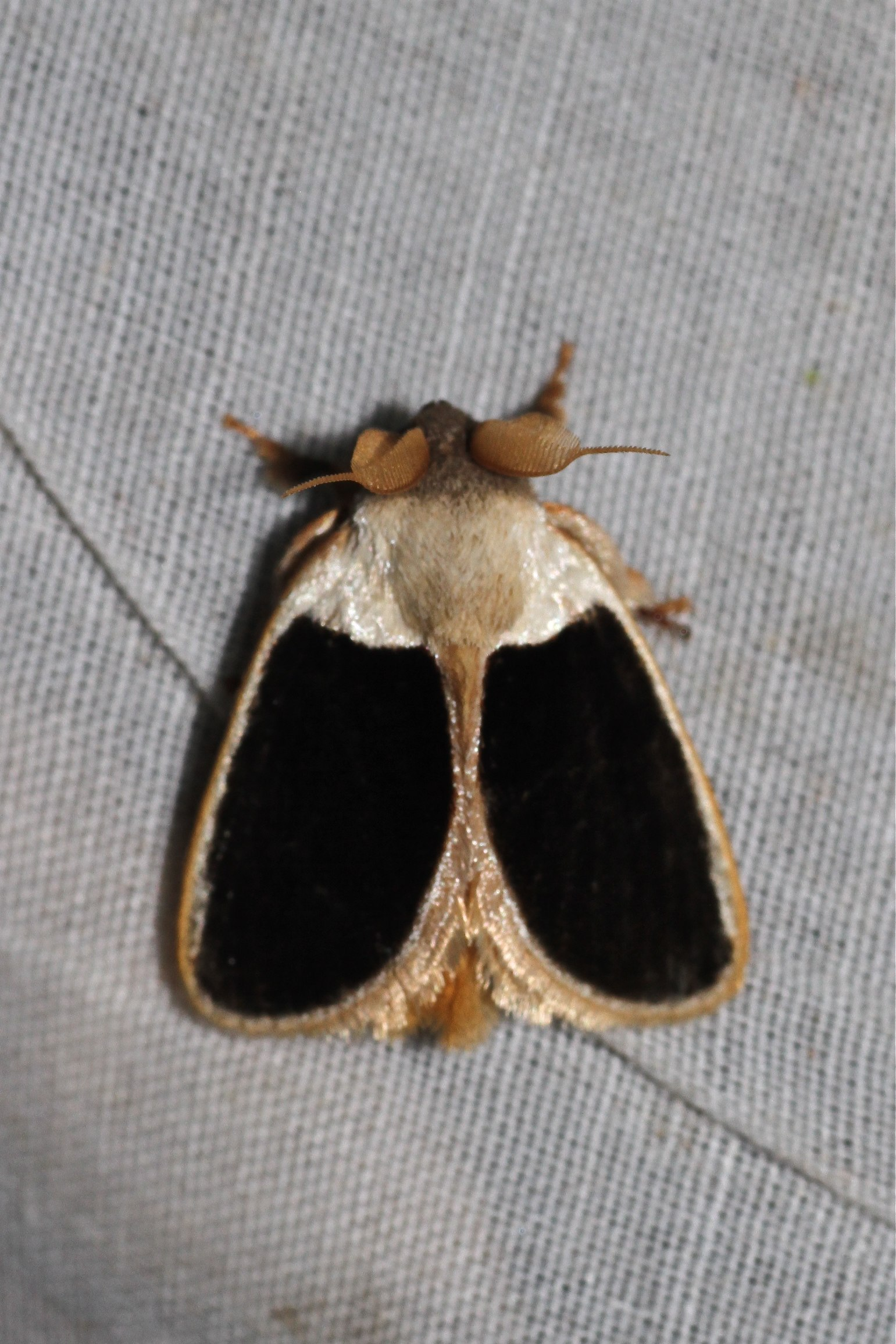
- Cania bandura

Scientific classification
- Domain: Eukaryota
- Kingdom: Animalia
- Phylum: Arthropoda
- Class: Insecta
- Order: Lepidoptera
- Family: Limacodidae
- Genus: Cania; Walker, 1855

= Cania (moth) =

Genus of moths

Cania is a genus of moths of the family Limacodidae. They occur in the South, Southeast, and East Asia (from India to China and Taiwan and south to Indonesia and the Philippines).

The forewing length in Cania is 7–18 mm (0.28–0.71 in). The forewing pattern is sexually dimorphic in the subgenus Cania but not in the subgenera Paracania and Minicania.

== Species ==
There are 22 species in three subgenera delineated by Solovyev (2014):

Subgenus Cania Walker, 1855

- Cania accea Solovyev & Witt, 2009
- Cania acutivalva Holloway, 1986
- Cania bandura (Moore, 1859)
- Cania guichardi Holloway, 1986
- Cania micacea (Walker, 1865)
- Cania obliquifascia (Hampson, 1900)
- Cania sericea Walker, 1855
- Cania siamensis Tams, 1924
- Cania styx Holloway, 1986
- Cania victori Solovyev & Witt, 2009

Subgenus Paracania Solovyev, 2014

- Cania bilinea (Walker, 1855)
- Cania cocki Holloway, 1987
- Cania heppneri Inoue, 1970
- Cania himalayana Holloway, 1987
- Cania javana Holloway, 1987
- Cania lourensi Solovyev, 2014
- Cania pseudorobusta Wu & Fang, 2009
- Cania robusta Hering, 1931
- Cania striola Hering, 1931
- Cania xizangensis Wu & Fang, 2009

Subgenus Minicania Solovyev, 2014

- Cania kitchingi Solovyev, 2014
- Cania minuta Holloway, 1986
