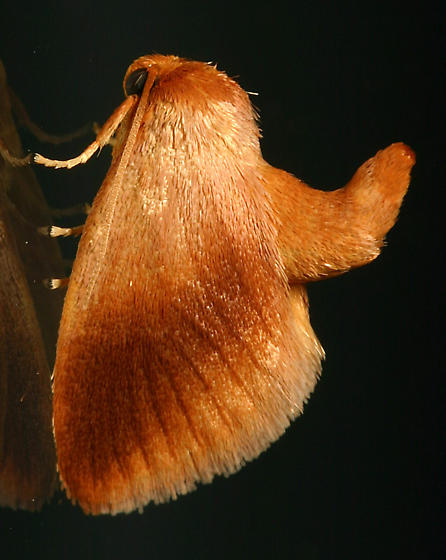
- Tortricidia testacea

Scientific classification
- Domain: Eukaryota
- Kingdom: Animalia
- Phylum: Arthropoda
- Class: Insecta
- Order: Lepidoptera
- Family: Limacodidae
- Genus: Tortricidia; Packard, 1864

= Tortricidia =

Genus of moths

Tortricidia is a genus of moths of the family Limacodidae. It was described by Alpheus Spring Packard in 1864.

== Species ==
- Tortricidia testacea Packard, 1864
- Tortricidia pallida (Herrich-Schäffer, 1854)
- Tortricidia flexuosa (Grote, 1880)
