= Pseudiragoides =

Scientific classification
- Kingdom: Animalia
- Phylum: Arthropoda
- Clade: Pancrustacea
- Class: Insecta
- Order: Lepidoptera
- Family: Limacodidae
- Genus: Pseudiragoides; Solovyev & Witt, 2009

Genus of moths

Pseudiragoides is a genus of moths of the family Limacodidae.

== Species ==
- Pseudiragoides florianii Solovyev & Witt, 2011
- Pseudiragoides itsova Solovyev & Witt, 2011
- Pseudiragoides spadix Solovyev & Witt, 2009
