= Olona (moth) =

Scientific classification
- Kingdom: Animalia
- Phylum: Arthropoda
- Class: Insecta
- Order: Lepidoptera
- Family: Limacodidae
- Genus: Olona; Snellen, 1900

Genus of moths

Olona is a genus of moths of the family Limacodidae.

== List of species ==
- Olona albistrigella Snellen, 1900
- Olona gateri (West, 1937)
