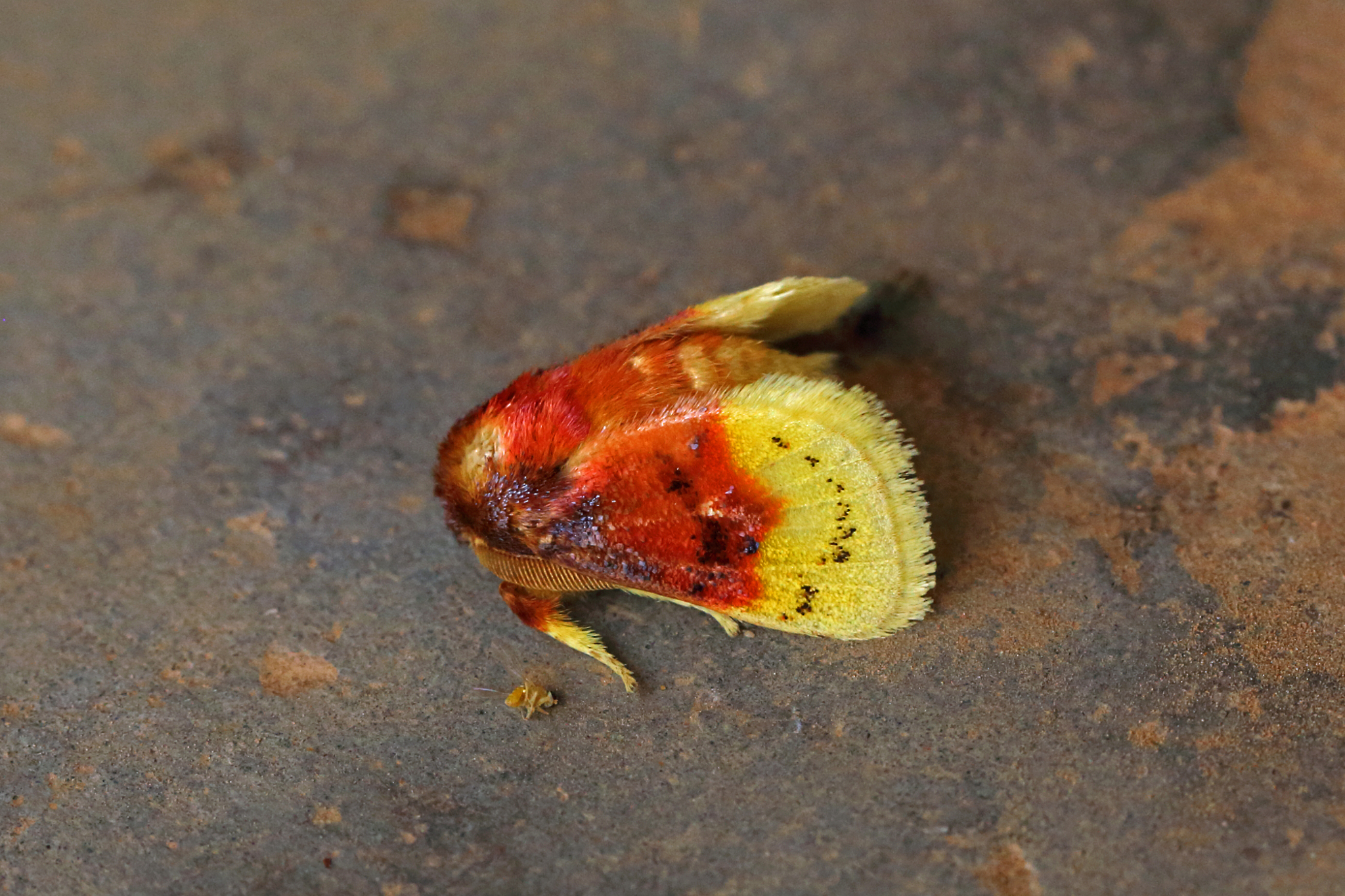
- Chrysamma purpuripulcra

Scientific classification
- Kingdom: Animalia
- Phylum: Arthropoda
- Class: Insecta
- Order: Lepidoptera
- Family: Limacodidae
- Subfamily: Limacodinae
- Genus: Chrysamma; Karsch, 1896

= Chrysamma =

Genus of moths

Chrysamma is a genus of slug moths described by Ferdinand Karsch in 1896.

== List of species ==
- Chrysamma amabilis Clench, 1955
- Chrysamma erythrochrysa Tams, 1929
- Chrysamma purpuripulcra Karsch, 1896
- Chrysamma syntomoctena Tams, 1929
