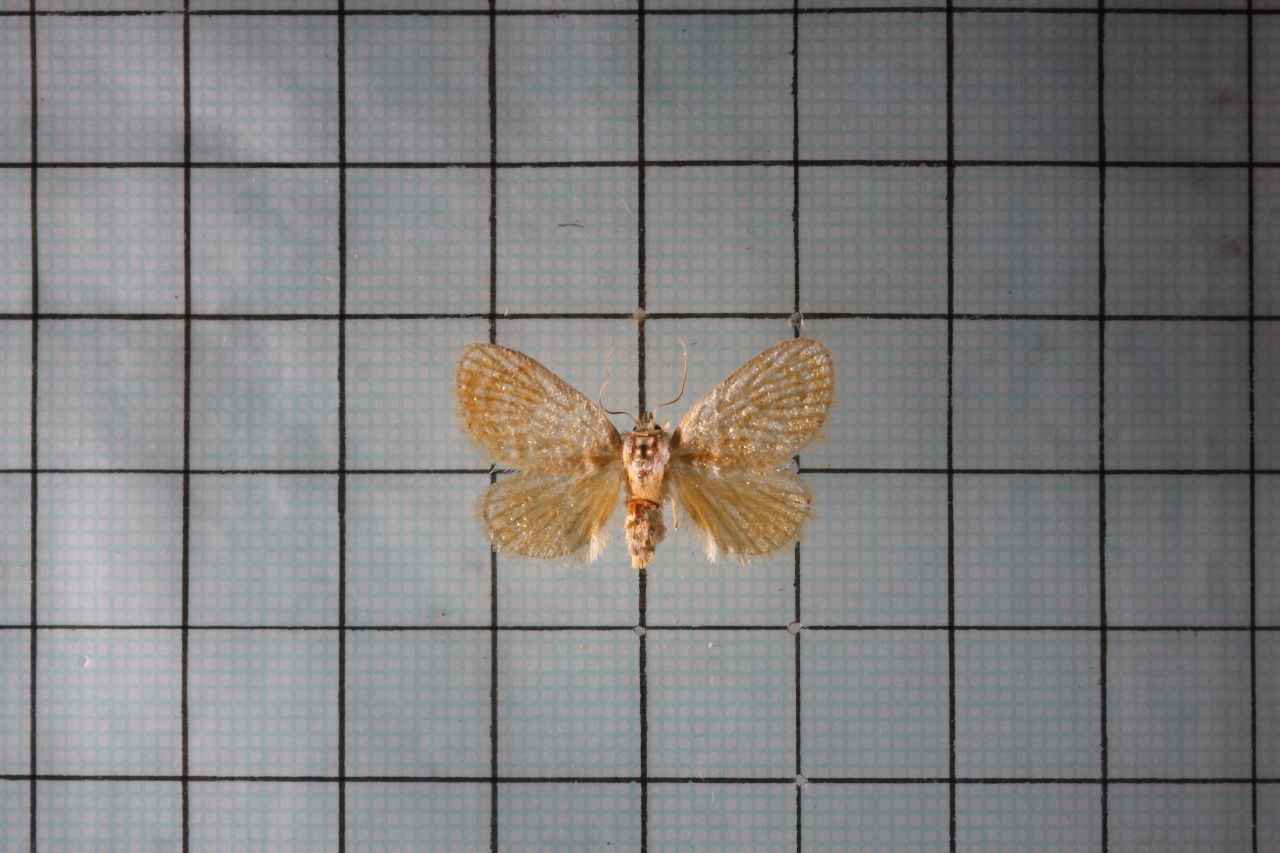
- Narosa fulgens

Scientific classification
- Domain: Eukaryota
- Kingdom: Animalia
- Phylum: Arthropoda
- Class: Insecta
- Order: Lepidoptera
- Family: Limacodidae
- Genus: Narosa; Walker, 1855

= Narosa =

Genus of moths

Narosa is a genus of moths of the family Limacodidae described by Francis Walker in 1855.

== Description ==
Antennae ciliated in male, simple in female. Palpi reaching vertex of head. Mid tibia with one pair of spurs, hind tibia with two pairs. Forewing with veins 7, 8 and 9 stalked. Hindwing with veins 6 and 7 stalked.

== Selected species ==
- Narosa albescens
- Narosa albidens Holloway, 1990
- Narosa ambigua
- Narosa argentipuncta
- Narosa aroa
- Narosa barnsi
- Narosa castanea
- Narosa concinna Swinhoe, 1901
- Narosa conspersa Walker, 1855
- Narosa doenia
- Narosa edoensis
- Narosa erminea
- Narosa fletcheri
- Narosa fulgens (Leech, 1889)
- Narosa harmani Holloway, 1986
- Narosa hedychroa
- Narosa irrorata
- Narosa lawaii Holloway, 1986
- Narosa nagani Holloway, 1986
- Narosa narcha
- Narosa nephochloeropis
- Narosa nigricristata
- Narosa nigrisigna (Wileman, 1911)
- Narosa nitobei Shiraki, 1913
- Narosa pectinata
- Narosa penicillata
- Narosa rosipuncta Holloway, 1986
- Narosa rufifascia
- Narosa silati Holloway, 1986
- Narosa talboti
- Narosa trilinea
- Narosa velutina Walker, 1862
- Narosa viridana
