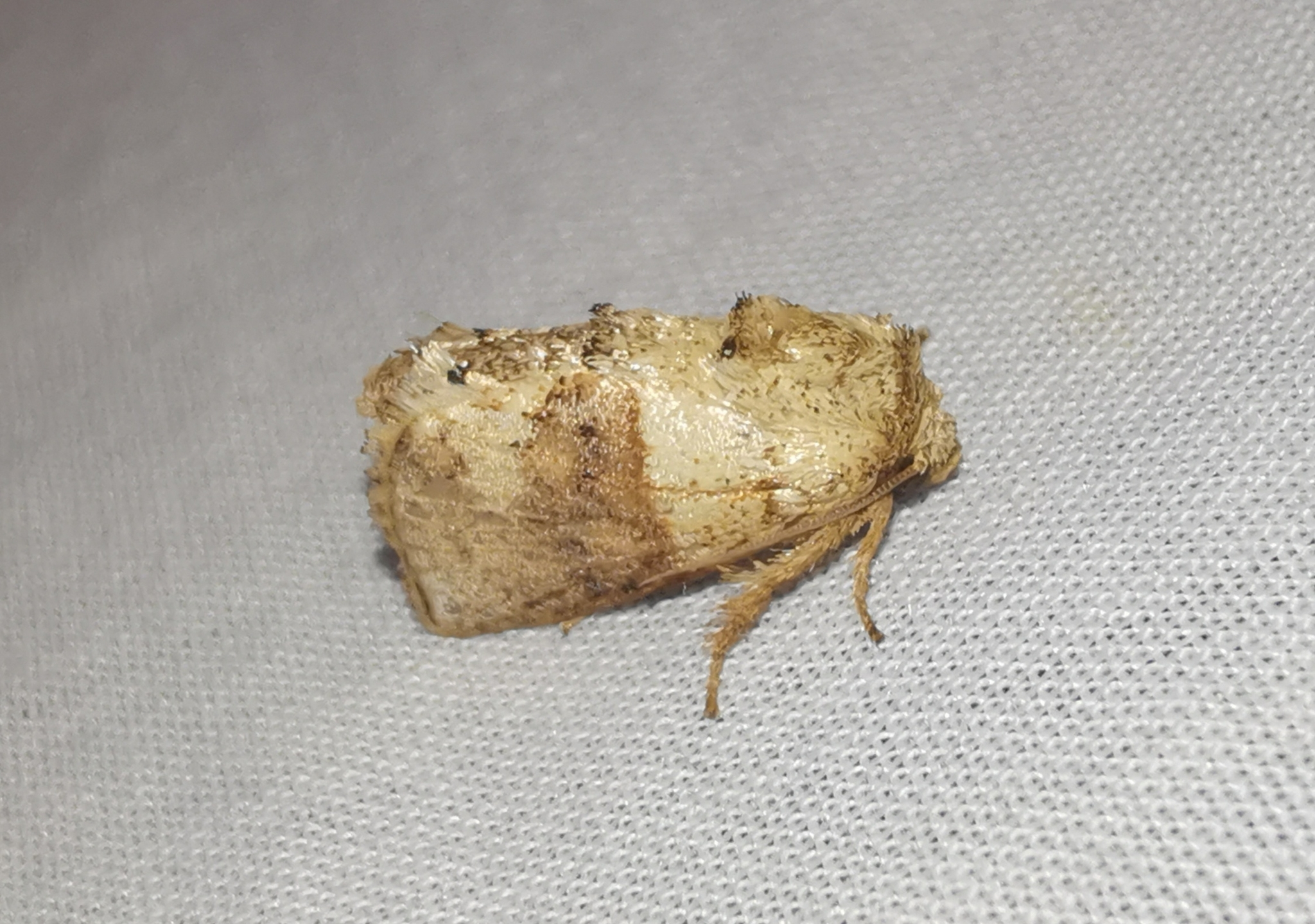
- Caissa parenti, Thailand

Scientific classification
- Domain: Eukaryota
- Kingdom: Animalia
- Phylum: Arthropoda
- Class: Insecta
- Order: Lepidoptera
- Family: Limacodidae
- Genus: Caissa; Hering, 1931

= Caissa (moth) =

Genus of moths

Caissa is a genus of slug caterpillar moths in the family Limacodidae. There are about 14 described species in Caissa, found in southern, southeastern, and eastern Asia.

== Species ==
These 14 species belong to the genus Caissa:

- Caissa aruna N. Singh & Ahmad, 2022
- Caissa aurea Solovyev & Witt, 2009
- Caissa bezverhkhovi Solovyev & Witt, 2009
- Caissa caii Wu & Fang, 2008
- Caissa caissa Hering, 1931
- Caissa fasciatum (Hampson, 1892)
- Caissa gambita Hering, 1931
- Caissa kangdinga Solovyev & Saldaitis, 2013
- Caissa kashungii Irungbam, Ahmad, N. Singh & Solovyev, 2022
- Caissa longisaccula Wu & Fang, 2008
- Caissa medialis Yoshimoto, 1994
- Caissa parenti Orphant, 2000
- Caissa staurognatha Wu, 2011
- Caissa yunnana Wu, Wu & Han, 2020
