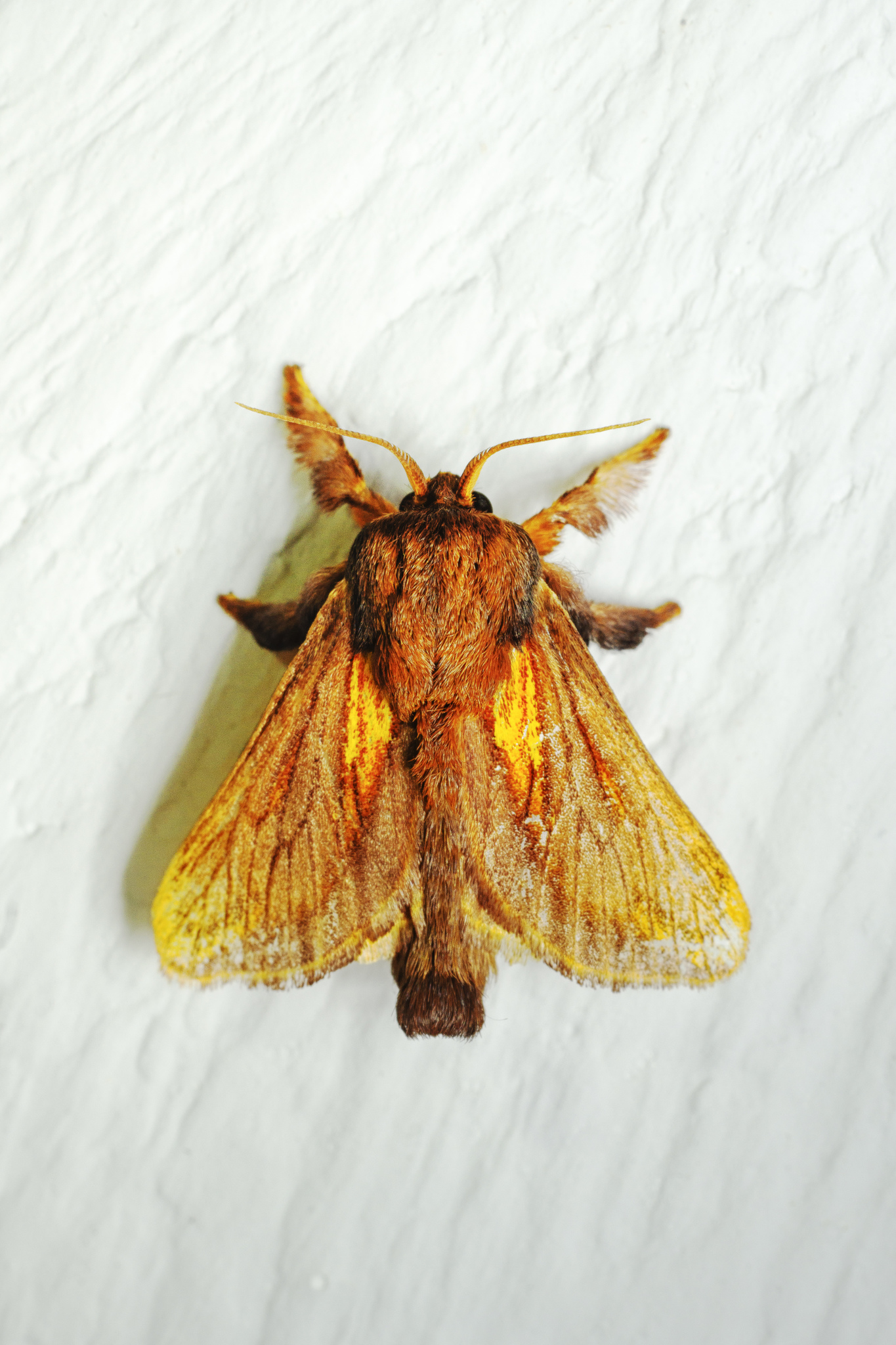
- Talima ingenour

Scientific classification
- Kingdom: Animalia
- Phylum: Arthropoda
- Class: Insecta
- Order: Lepidoptera
- Family: Limacodidae
- Subfamily: Limacodinae
- Genus: Talima; Walker, 1855

= Talima (moth) =

Genus of moths

Talima is a genus of moths of the family Limacodidae.

== Species ==
There are more than 19 species in the genus: (after)

- Talima assimilis (Dyar, 1905)
- Talima aurora (Dyar, 1905)
- Talima beckeri Epstein & Corrales, 2004
- Talima erojasi Epstein & Corrales, 2004
- Talima weissi Epstein & Corrales, 2004
