= Isa =

Isa or ISA may refer to:

== Places ==
- Mount Isa, Queensland, Australia, a city
  - Mount Isa Airport, IATA airport code "ISA", airport serving the city
- Isa Town, middle class town located in Bahrain
- Isa (river), a river in Belarus
- Isa, Kagoshima, Japan, a city
  - Isa District, Kagoshima, former district in Japan, equivalent to the current city
- Isa, Nigeria
- Isa, Amur Oblast, Russia

== People ==
- Īsā, the name of Jesus in Islam
- Isa (name), an Arabic name corresponding to Jesus in English
- Isa, stage name of Lee Chae-young, member of K-Pop group STAYC
- Isa, female given name, short for Isabel or similar names beginning with Isa- such as Isadora
- Isa Maud Ilsen (1868–1937), Canadian-American music therapist, nurse, lecturer
- Isa Tengblad (born 1998), Swedish singer using the mononym Isa
- Juan Isa (1913–1993), president of the International Baseball Federation (FIBA) from 1969 to 1975

== Arts, entertainment, and media ==
=== Fictional entities ===
- ISA (Days of Our Lives), spy agency in a TV series
- Isa the iguana, in TV series Dora the Explorer
- Interplanetary Strategic Alliance (ISA), military alliance in videogame saga Killzone

=== Other uses in arts, entertainment, and media ===
- Isa (Enslaved album), 2004
- Isa (Zaz album), 2021
- Isa (film), a 2014 television film
- Isa, a dance in music of the Canary Islands

== Computing ==
- Industry Standard Architecture, a PC computer bus standard
- Instruction set architecture, the specification for data types, registers, instructions, etc. for a given computer hardware architecture
- Is-a, a relationship between abstractions in programming
- Internet Security and Acceleration, a network router, firewall, antivirus program, VPN server and web cache from Microsoft Corporation

== Education ==
- Indian Squash Academy, Chennai, India
- Independent Schools Association (Australia), mainly for sports
- Independent Schools Association (UK), organisation for independent schools in the United Kingdom
- Iniciativa de Salud de las Americas, Spanish name for Health Initiative of the Americas
- Institute for the Study of the Americas, University of London, England
- Instituto Superior de Agronomia, an agronomy faculty in Lisbon, Portugal
- Instituto Superior de Arte, an art school in Havana, Cuba
- International School Amsterdam, the Netherlands
- International School Augsburg
- International School of Aleppo, Syria
- International School of Athens, Greece
- International School of the Americas, San Antonio, Texas
- International Studies Association
- Islamic Saudi Academy

== Finance ==
- Income share agreement, a borrowing agreement sometimes used for tuition loans in the United States
- Individual savings account, class of retail investment arrangement available in the United Kingdom
- International Standards on Auditing, professional standards for the auditing of financial information.
- Israel Securities Authority, Israel's national securities regulator

== Companies ==
- Interconexion Electrica, a Colombian company operating energy transmission lines

== Government ==
- Independent Safeguarding Authority, former UK child protection agency
- Intelligence Services Act 1994, UK
- Intelligence Support Activity, of the US Army
- Internal Security Agency, secret service and counter-espionage agency in Poland
- International Seabed Authority, for mineral-related activities
- International Searching Authority, for patents
- International Solar Alliance
- Interoperability Solutions for European Public Administrations, EU
- Invention Secrecy Act of the United States Congress
- Iranian Space Agency
- Israel Security Agency or Shin Bet, Israel
- Israel Space Agency
- Israel State Archives, the national archive of Israel
- Italian Space Agency

== Organizations and brands ==
- Industry Super Australia, the peak body for industry superannuation funds in Australia
- Innovative Software Applications, a company taken over by Sorcim in 1982
- International Federation of the National Standardizing Associations
- International Seabed Authority
- International Socialist Alternative, an international association of Trotskyist political parties.
- International Society of Arboriculture, a non-profit botanical organization
- International Society of Automation, a non-profit professional organization for engineers, technicians, and students
- International Sociological Association
- International Soling Association
- International Surfing Association, the world governing authority for the sport of surfing
- Irish Sailing Association, the governing body for sailing in Ireland
- International Slackline Association

== Science ==
- Isosaccharinic acid, a six-carbon sugar acid
- Intrinsic sympatheticomimetic activity, a term used with beta blockers that are partial agonists
- Infectious salmon anemia, a viral disease of salmon
- International Standard Atmosphere, an atmospheric model of the Earth
- International Seismological Association, former name of the International Association of Seismology and Physics of the Earth's Interior (IASPEI)
- Isa (moth), a genera of moths.

== Other uses ==
- Intelligent speed adaptation, systems to automatically enforce vehicle speed limits
- International Symbol of Access, blue and white wheelchair symbol
- ISA Brown, type of chicken
- Ideological state apparatus, a theory by Louis Althusser

== See also ==
- Internal Security Act (disambiguation)
- Isaz, the "I" rune in the Scandinavian runic alphabet
- Issa (disambiguation)
- Isha (disambiguation)
- ESA (disambiguation)
- lSA (disambiguation)
