= Issa =

Issa or ISSA may refer to:

== People ==
- Issa (name), a given name and surname
- Issa (mythology), people in Greek mythology
- Kobayashi Issa (1763–1828), a Japanese poet
- Issa or Isa, the Arabic name for Jesus in Islam
- Issa, another name for the Native American Catawba people
- El-Issa family
- Issa (clan), a Somali clan that mainly inhabits Djibouti
- Jane Siberry (born 1955), Canadian singer who released several albums under the name Issa
- Issa, the nickname of Luttif Afif, a leader of the Black September terror squad at the 1972 Olympic Games

== Places ==
- Issa (polis), the Ancient Greek and Roman name for both the town of Vis and the Adriatic island of Vis, in modern-day Croatia
- Issa (Lesbos) (Ἴσσα), ancient town of Lesbos, Greece, formerly applied to the island as well
- Issa (inhabited locality) (Исса), several inhabited localities in Russia
  - Issa, Penza Oblast
  - Issa, Pskov Oblast
- Issa, Polish spelling of Isa (river) (Belarusian: Іса)
- Issa (Ghana), town in Ghana

== Acronyms and abbreviations ==
- Independent Schools Sports Association, now known as the Sports Association for Adelaide Schools
- Information Systems Security Association
- Instituto Superior de Secretariado y Administracion (ISSA), a center of the University of Navarra that trains elite management assistants
- International Sailing Schools Association, an international association of sailing schools
- International Sanamahism Students' Association, Kangleipak, an international association of the students of a traditional Meitei religion
- International Social Security Association, headquartered in Geneva, Switzerland
- International Sports Sciences Association, an international organization of fitness experts which certifies personal fitness trainers
- International Ship Suppliers Association
- International Strategic Studies Association
- Interscholastic Sailing Association
- Irish Seed Savers Association
- Islamic Solidarity Sports Association

== Other uses ==
- Issa (moth), a moth genus
- Issa Album, 2017 album by 21 Savage
- Issa (Belgariad), a divine character in David Eddings's fantasy series The Belgariad and The Malloreon

== See also ==
- Isa (disambiguation)
- ISSE (disambiguation)
- Issei
