= LSA =

LSA or Lsa is an acronym standing for:

== Education and academia ==
- Licence of the Society of Apothecaries
- Light: Science & Applications, a scientific journal
- Student Union of Latvia (Latvijas Studentu apvienība)

=== Institutions ===
- College of Literature, Science, and the Arts at the University of Michigan
- University of Liverpool School of Architecture, England, UK
- La Salle Academy, a Catholic, all-boys high school in New York
- Lakshmipat Singhania Academy, a non-profit school group in India

== Military ==
- Light Small Arms
- Logistics Support Analysis, a military support planning methodology
- Logistics Support Area, a large military depot
- London Small Arms Co. Ltd, an English gun-making firm between 1866 and 1935
- Lubricant, Semi-fluid, Automatic Weapons, MIL-L-46000

== Organizations ==
- Law and Society Association
- Law Society of Alberta
- League for Socialist Action, a Canadian political group active in the 1960s and 70s
- Learn and Serve America, a U.S. government community service program
- Licentiate of the Society of Apothecaries
- Linguistic Society of America
- Lithuanian Space Association, Lithuania's space agency
- Luxembourg Space Agency, national space agency of the Grand-Duchy of Luxembourg
- Local Spiritual Assembly, an administrative body of the Bahá'í Faith
- Lone Scouts of America, an independent Scouting organization that merged into the Boy Scouts of America
- Lone Star Alliance, lacrosse-only athletic conference
- Lutheran Services in America, the largest network of human service organizations in the United States
- Student Union of Latvia (Latvijas Studentu apvienība)

== Places ==
- London Stansted Airport
- Lytham St. Annes, seaside town in Lancashire, England
- LSA, IATA airport code of Losuia Airport in Papua New Guinea

== Science and technology ==
- Late Stone Age
- Least squares adjustment
- Anterolateral central arteries of the brain
- Lichen sclerosus et atrophicus, a skin disease
- Light-sport aircraft
- Lobe Separation Angle, see cam
- Lsa, the abbreviation for the orchid genus Luisia
- Lysergic acid amide (ergine), a compound closely related to LSD
- Lötfrei, schraubfrei, abisolierfrei, an insulation-displacement connector for telecommunications
- Liver stage antigen, a set of peptides
- Low specific activity, radioactive substances produced by oil and gas production installations. Also referred to as NORM, naturally occurring radioactive material

=== Computing ===
- Latent semantic analysis, a technique in natural language processing
- Link-state advertisement, communication mechanism of the OSPF routing protocol for IP
- Local Security Authority Subsystem Service (Local Security Authority), the centre of the Windows NT security subsystem (lsass.exe)
- License and Services Agreement

== Other uses ==
- Argentine Sign Language (Spanish: Lengua de señas argentina), a sign language used in Argentina
- Lighting & Sound America, an entertainment technology magazine published by PLASA Media Inc
- Linseed Sunflower Almond, a health food that is a ground mixture of these three seeds
- Limited symptom attack, a milder form of panic attack, with fewer than four panic-related symptoms
- Life-saving appliance, the multitude of devices designed for saving lifes typically found on a ship. Ranging from e.g. rescue boat to SART

== See also ==
- ISA (disambiguation)
