= PAS =

PAS or Pas may refer to:

== Companies and organizations ==
- Pakistan Academy of Sciences
- Pakistan Administrative Service
- Pan Am Southern, a freight railroad owned by Norfolk Southern and CSX
- Pan American Silver, a mining company in Canada
- Paradox Access Solutions, a construction company
- Percussive Arts Society, percussion organization
- Petroleum Air Services, an Egyptian airline operating helicopter services to support the oil industry
- Poetry Association of Scotland
- Polish Academy of Sciences
- Port Auxiliary Service, formerly the British Admiralty Yard Craft Service
- Production Automotive Services, an American specialty vehicle manufacturer

=== Political parties ===
- Malaysian Islamic Party, Malaysia
- Partido Alianza Social, Mexico
- Party of Action and Solidarity, Moldova

== Places ==
- The Pas (electoral district), in Manitoba, Canada
- The Pas, town in Canada
- Le Pas, commune in France
- Sihanoukville Autonomous Port (Port Autonome de Sihanoukville), Cambodia
- Penteli Astronomical Station, an observatory in Greece

== Science ==
- PAS diastase stain
- PAS domain, a protein domain
- Panic and Agoraphobia Scale, a psychological rating scale
- Para-aminosalicylic acid, a treatment for tuberculosis
- Parental alienation syndrome
- Periodic acid-Schiff stain for biological tissues
- Placenta accreta spectrum
- Post-abortion syndrome
- Pascal second (Pa⋅s), SI unit of viscosity
- PAS, seismological station code for the Caltech Seismological Laboratory

== Sports ==
- PAS Giannina F.C., a Greek football club from Ioannina
- PAS Hamedan F.C., an Iranian football club from Hamedan
- PAS Tehran F.C., a defunct Iranian football club from Tehran
- Pan American Stadium (New Orleans)
- Pan American Stadium (Winnipeg)
- Pan American Stakes, an American Thoroughbred horse race

== Technology ==
- Personal Access System, a wireless telephone standard
- Pedal assist system, on an electric bicycle
- Positron annihilation spectroscopy
- Patient administration system, developed out of the automation of administrative paperwork
- Process automation system, for industrial plants
- Media Vision Pro AudioSpectrum, computer sound cards
- .pas, Pascal programming language file extension
- PAS 1, etc. satellites by PanAmSat
- Power-assisted steering, or power steering, in automobiles

== Other uses ==
- Pacific American School, an international school in Hsinchu City, Taiwan
- Pas (river), in Spain
- List of positions filled by presidential appointment with Senate confirmation, "Presidential Appointment needing Senate confirmation"
- Ion Pas (1895-1974), Romanian writer and politician
- Physician-assisted suicide
- Portable Antiquities Scheme, UK record of small archaeological finds
- Publicly Available Specification, UK consultative standards documents
- Personal anchor system, in rock climbing

== See also ==
- Pan American School (disambiguation)
- Pan American Stadium (disambiguation)
