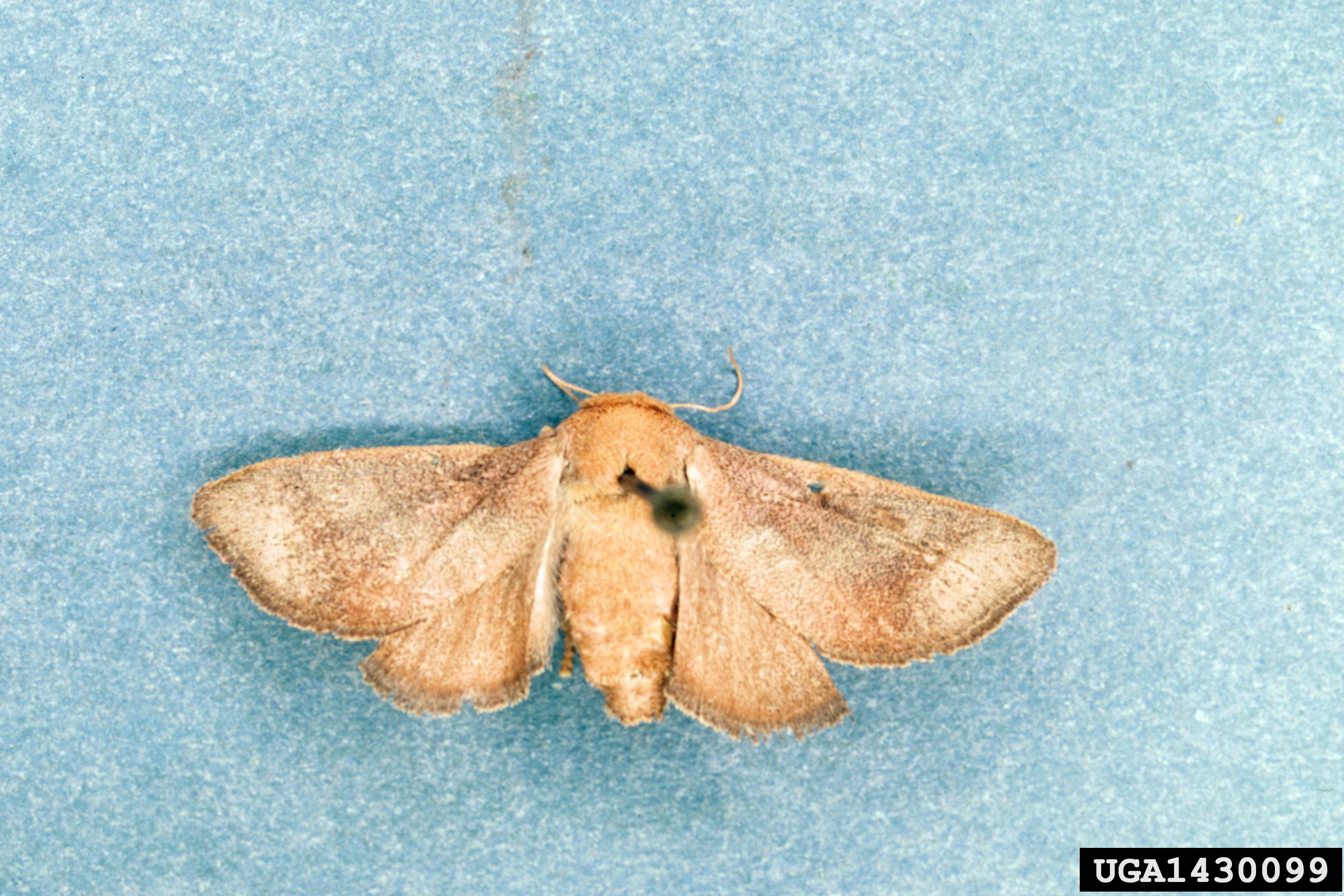

Scientific classification
- Domain: Eukaryota
- Kingdom: Animalia
- Phylum: Arthropoda
- Class: Insecta
- Order: Lepidoptera
- Family: Limacodidae
- Genus: Isa
- Species: I. textula

Binomial name
- Isa textula (Herrich-Schäffer, [1854])

Synonyms
- Limacodes textula Herrich-Schäffer, [1854]; Limacodes inornata Grote & Robinson, 1867

= Isa textula =

Species of moth

Isa textula, the crowned slug moth or skiff moth is a moth of the family Limacodidae. It is found in North America from Minnesota, southern Ontario and Massachusetts to Florida, Texas, and Mississippi.

The larvae feed on the leaves of various trees, including oak, cherry, maple, basswood, elm and beech.

Another moth, Prolimacodes badia, is also referred to by the common name skiff moth.

== Gallery ==
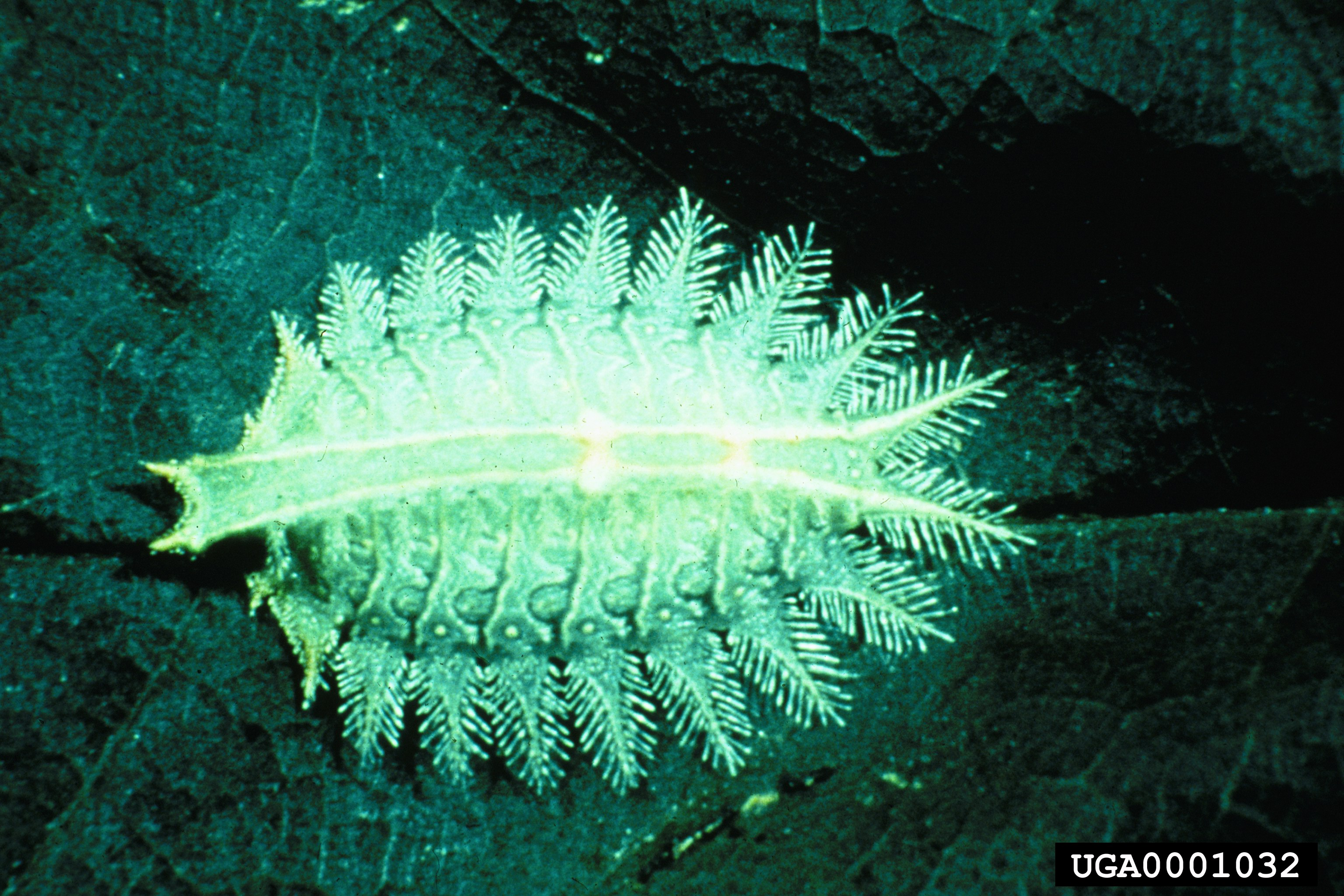
Larva

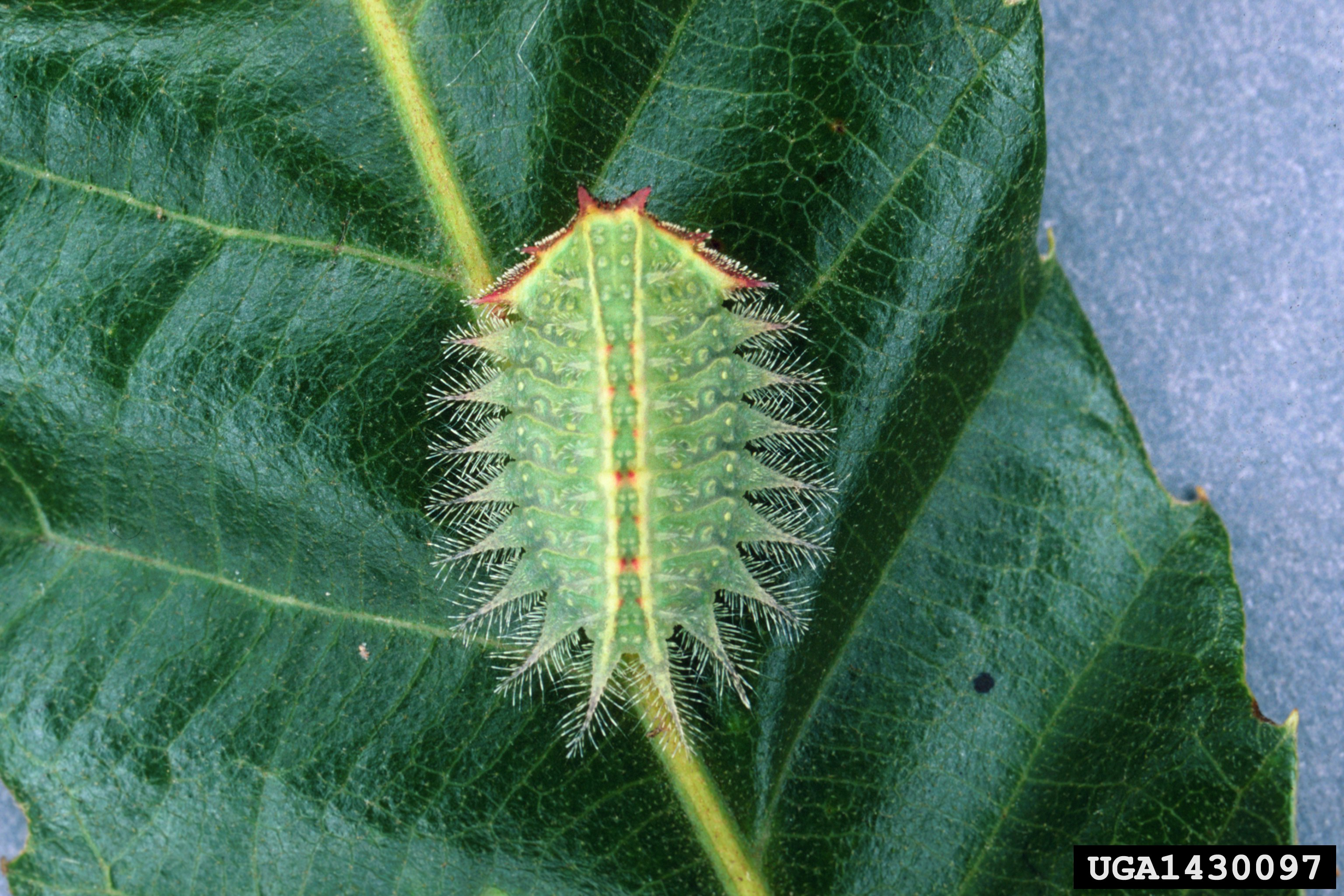
Larva

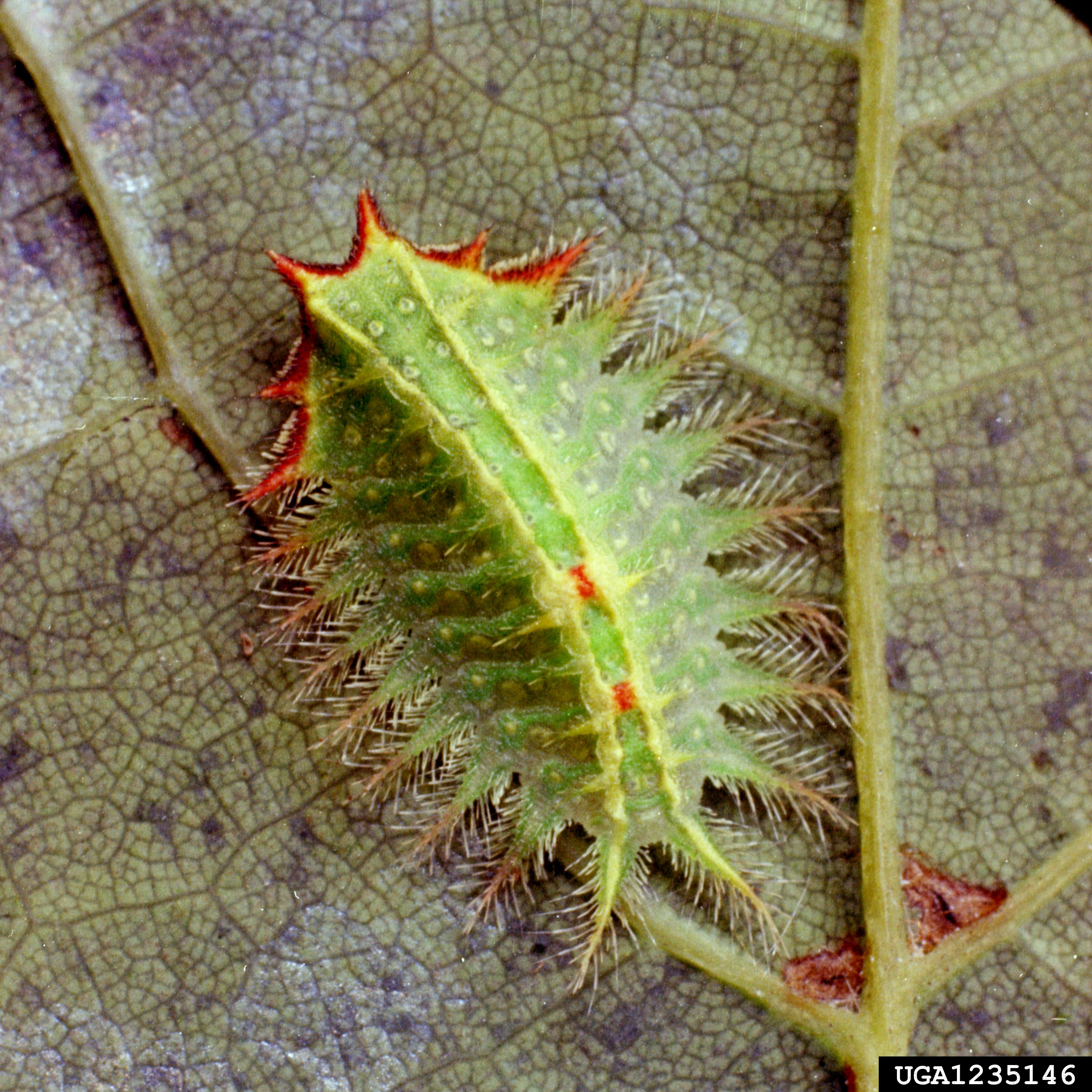
Larva

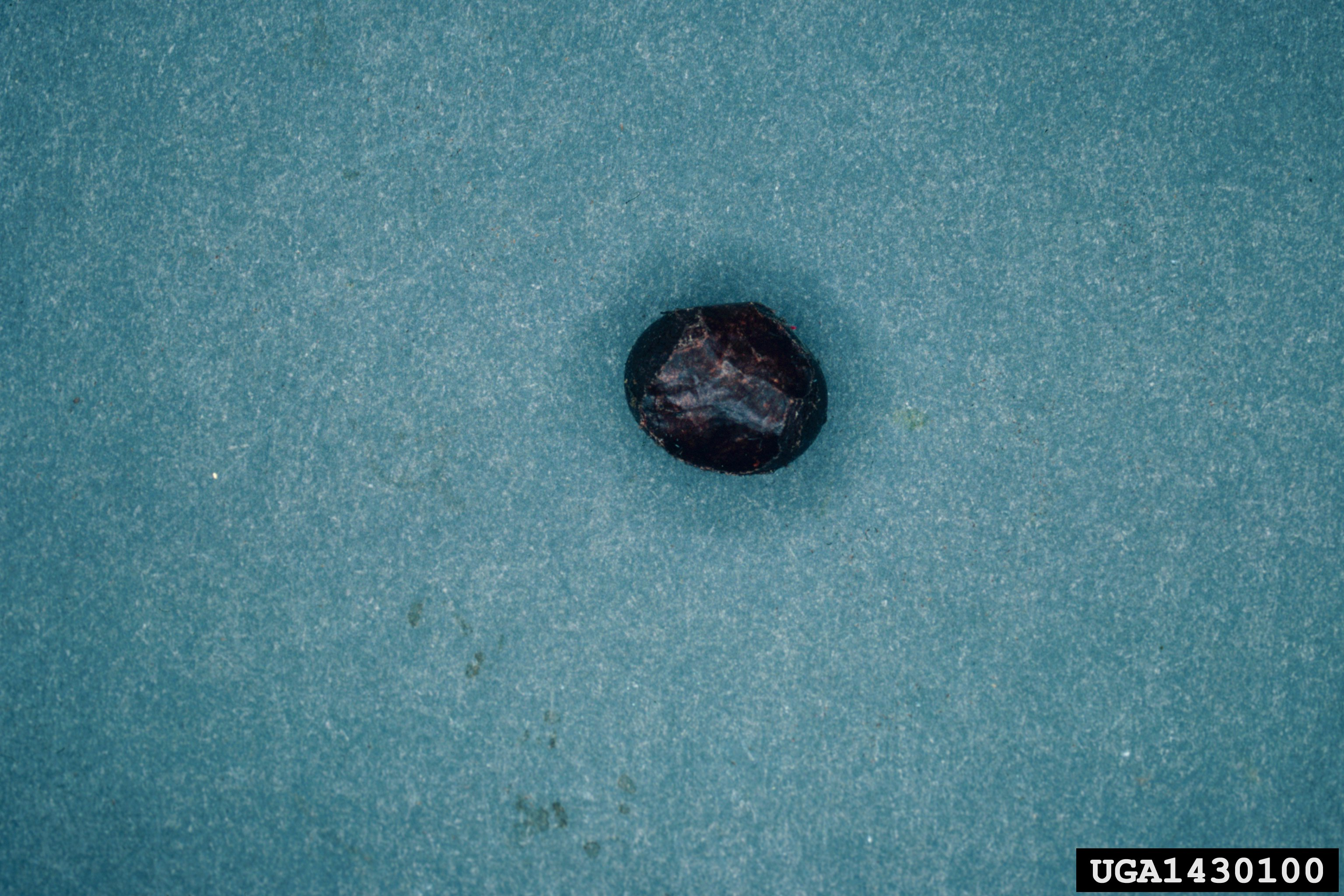
Cocoon
