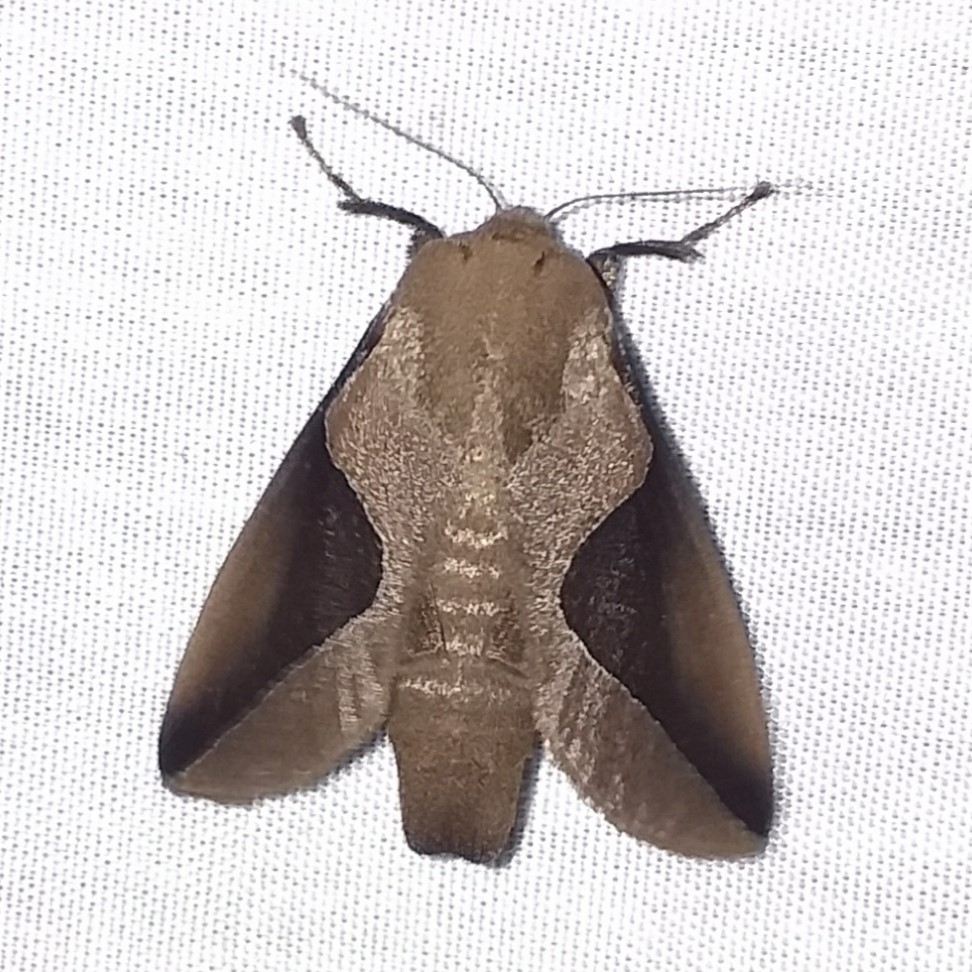

Scientific classification
- Domain: Eukaryota
- Kingdom: Animalia
- Phylum: Arthropoda
- Class: Insecta
- Order: Lepidoptera
- Family: Limacodidae
- Genus: Prolimacodes
- Species: P. lilalia

Binomial name
- Prolimacodes lilalia Dyar, 1937

Synonyms
- Prionoxystus lilalia

= Prolimacodes lilalia =

Species of moth

Prolimacodes lilalia is a species of moth in the family Limacodidae. It was described by Harrison Gray Dyar Jr. in 1937. It is found in French Guiana.
