= Panic disorder =

Anxiety disorder

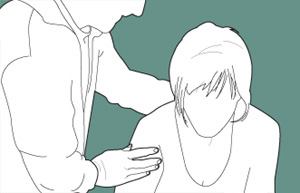
- Depiction of someone with a panic attack, being reassured by another person
- Specialty: Psychiatry, clinical psychology
- Symptoms: Sudden, recurrent periods of intense fear, palpitations, sweating, shaking, shortness of breath, numbness
- Usual onset: Sudden and recurrent
- Causes: Unknown
- Risk factors: Family history, smoking, psychological stress, history of child abuse
- Diagnostic method: Based on symptoms after ruling out other potential causes
- Differential diagnosis: Heart disease, hyperthyroidism, drug use
- Treatment: Counselling, medications
- Medication: Antidepressants, benzodiazepines, beta blockers
- Frequency: 2.5% of people at some point

Panic disorder is an anxiety disorder characterized by recurring unexpected panic attacks. Panic attacks are sudden periods of intense fear that may include palpitations, sweating, shaking, shortness of breath, numbness, or a sense of impending doom. The maximum degree of symptoms occurs within minutes. There may be ongoing worries about having further attacks and avoidance of places where attacks have occurred in the past.

The exact cause of panic disorder is not fully understood; however, there are several factors linked to the disorder, such as a stressful or traumatic life event, having close family members with the disorder, and an imbalance of neurotransmitters. Diagnosis involves ruling out other potential causes of anxiety including other mental disorders, medical conditions such as heart disease or hyperthyroidism, and drug use. Screening for the condition may be done using a questionnaire.

Panic disorder is usually treated with counselling and medications. The type of counselling used is typically cognitive behavioral therapy (CBT), which is effective in more than half of people. Medications used include antidepressants, benzodiazepines, and beta blockers. Following stopping treatment, up to 30% of people have a recurrence.

Panic disorder affects about 2.5% of people at some point in their lives. It usually begins during adolescence or early adulthood, but may affect people of any age. It is less common in children and elderly people. Women are more likely than men to develop panic disorder.

== Signs and symptoms ==
Individuals with panic disorder usually have a series of intense episodes of extreme anxiety during panic attacks. These attacks typically last about ten minutes, and can be as short-lived as 1–5 minutes, but can last twenty minutes to an hour, and they can occasionally last for even longer or until helpful intervention is made. The intensity and symptoms of panic during panic attacks may vary.

In some cases, the attack may continue at unabated high intensity or seem to be increasing in severity. Managing panic disorder can be a challenge, but several strategies can help individuals manage their symptoms and improve their social life. Common symptoms of panic disorder attack include rapid heartbeat, perspiration, dizziness, dyspnea, trembling, uncontrollable fear such as: the fear of losing control and going crazy, the fear of dying and hyperventilation. Other symptoms are a sensation of choking, paralysis, chest pain, nausea, numbness or tingling, chills or hot flashes, vision problems, faintness, crying and some sense of altered reality. In addition, the person usually has thoughts of impending doom. Individuals experiencing an episode often have a strong wish to escape from the situation that provoked the attack. The anxiety of panic disorder is particularly severe and noticeably episodic compared to that from generalized anxiety disorder. Panic attacks may be provoked by exposure to certain stimuli (e.g., seeing a mouse) or settings (e.g., the dentist's office). Nocturnal panic attacks are common in people with panic disorder. Other attacks may appear unprovoked. Some individuals deal with these events regularly, sometimes daily or weekly.

Limited symptom attacks are similar to panic attacks but have fewer symptoms. Most people with Parkinson's disease experience both panic attacks and limited symptom attacks.

Studies investigating the relationship between interoception and panic disorder have shown that people with panic disorder feel heartbeat sensations more intensely when stimulated by pharmacological agents, suggesting that they experience heightened interoceptive awareness compared to subjects without Parkinson's disease.

== Causes ==
=== Psychological models ===
Psychological factors, stressful life events, life transitions, and environment, as well as often thinking in a way that exaggerates relatively normal bodily reactions, are also believed to play a role in the onset of panic disorder. Often, the first attacks are triggered by physical illnesses, major stress, or certain medications. People who tend to take on excessive responsibilities may develop a tendency to have panic attacks. Individuals with post-traumatic stress disorder (PTSD) also show a much higher rate of panic disorder than the general population.

A meta-analysis by Zhang and others (2021) identified adverse childhood experiences (ACEs) as risk factors for panic disorder. These ACEs included physical abuse, emotional abuse, emotional neglect, sexual abuse, parental alcoholism, and parental separation and loss. A systematic review and meta-analysis by Gardner and others (2019) found associations between anxiety disorders and various forms of childhood maltreatment.

The presence of a cognitive impetus has also been explored. Theorists believe that people with panic disorder may experience panic reactions because they mistake their bodily sensations for life-threatening situations. These bodily sensations cause some people to feel as though they are out of control, which may lead to feelings of panic. This misconception of bodily sensations is referred to as anxiety sensitivity, and studies suggest that people who score higher on anxiety sensitivity surveys are five times more likely to be diagnosed with panic disorder.

=== Substance use ===
Substance use disorders are often correlated with panic attacks. In a study, 39% of people with panic disorder had used substances recreationally. Of those who used alcohol, 63% reported that the alcohol use began before the onset of panic, and 59% of those using illicit substances reported that substance use began first. The study that was conducted documented the panic-substance use disorder relationship. Substance use disorder began before the onset of panic, and substances were used to self-medicate for panic attacks by only a few subjects.

==== Amphetamines ====
In another study, 100 methamphetamine-dependent individuals were analyzed for co-morbid psychiatric disorders; of the 100 individuals, 36% were categorized as having co-morbid psychiatric disorders. Mood and psychotic disorders were more prevalent than anxiety disorders, which accounted for 7% of the 100 sampled individuals.

==== Smoking ====
Tobacco smoking increases the risk of developing panic disorder with or without agoraphobia and panic attacks; smoking started in adolescence or early adulthood particularly increases this risk of developing panic disorder. While the mechanism of how smoking increases panic attacks is not fully understood, a few hypotheses have been derived. Smoking cigarettes may lead to panic attacks by causing changes in respiratory function (e.g., feeling short of breath). These respiratory changes, in turn, can lead to the formation of panic attacks, as respiratory symptoms are a prominent feature of panic. Respiratory abnormalities have been found in children with high levels of anxiety, which suggests that a person with these difficulties may be susceptible to panic attacks, and thus more likely to subsequently develop panic disorder. Nicotine, a stimulant, could contribute to panic attacks. However, nicotine withdrawal may also cause significant anxiety which could contribute to panic attacks.

It is also possible that panic disorder patients smoke cigarettes as a form of self-medication to lessen anxiety. Nicotine and other psychoactive compounds with antidepressant properties in tobacco smoke, which act as monoamine oxidase inhibitors in the brain, can alter mood and have a calming effect, depending on dose.

==== Stimulants ====
A number of clinical studies have shown a positive association between caffeine ingestion and panic disorder and/or anxiogenic effects. People who have panic disorder are more sensitive to the anxiety-provoking effects of caffeine. One of the major anxiety-provoking effects of caffeine is an increase in heart rate.

Certain cold and flu medications containing decongestants may also contain pseudoephedrine, ephedrine, phenylephrine, naphazoline and oxymetazoline. These may be avoided by the use of decongestants formulated to prevent high blood pressure.

==== Alcohol and sedatives ====
An estimated 17% of people with anxiety and phobic disorders (including panic disorder) have an alcohol use disorder, compared to an estimated 10% of people without anxiety or phobic disorders. However, the meta-analysis that reports these figures found considerable heterogeneity between the studies combined to produce the figures. Any anxiety or phobic disorder is associated with 1.5 to 3 times greater odds of "lifetime stimulant use, cocaine use, and hallucinogen use". For context, in 2025, a US general population survey by SAMHSA found a lifetime cocaine use rate of 14.1% and a lifetime hallucinogen use rate of 17.5% (see section 1 PE, table 1.1B). Utilization of recreational drugs or alcohol generally makes symptoms worse. Most stimulant drugs (e.g., caffeine, nicotine, cocaine) would be expected to worsen the condition, since they directly increase the symptoms of panic, such as heart rate.

While alcohol initially helps ease panic disorder symptoms, medium- or long-term hazardous alcohol use can cause panic disorder to develop or worsen during alcohol intoxication, especially during alcohol withdrawal syndrome. This effect is not unique to alcohol, but can also occur with long-term use of drugs which have a similar mechanism of action to alcohol, such as benzodiazepines, which are sometimes prescribed as tranquilizers to people with alcohol problems. However, benzodiazepines are more selective anxiolytic agents than alcohol, which has numerous affinity for receptors that benzodiazepines do not effect. Chronic alcohol misuse worsens panic disorder due to distortion of brain chemistry and function and the fact that alcohol is a poor anxiolytic agent and is often more euphoric that benzodiazepines, however, its duration of action is short and its selectivity is poor. Since most benzodiazepines are highly selective GABA_{A} positive allosteric modulators, the anxiolytic effect mediated by increased GABAergic activity is stronger than alcohol, which binds to numerous other receptors and has poor selectivity as a GABAergic agent, and alcohol even acts as a negative allosteric modulator of NDMA receptors, which likely contributes to its impairing and euphoric effects, along with numerous other target receptors.

Approximately 10% of patients will experience notable protracted withdrawal symptoms, which can include panic disorder, after discontinuation of benzodiazepines. Protracted withdrawal symptoms tend to resemble those seen during the first couple of months of withdrawal but usually are of a subacute level of severity compared to the symptoms seen during the first 2 or 3 months of withdrawal. It is not known definitively whether such symptoms persisting long after withdrawal are related to true pharmacological withdrawal or whether they are due to structural neuronal damage as a result of chronic use of benzodiazepines or withdrawal. Nevertheless, such symptoms do typically lessen as the months and years go by, eventually disappearing altogether.

A significant proportion of patients attending mental health services for conditions including anxiety disorders, such as panic disorder or social phobia, have developed these conditions as a result of recreational alcohol or sedative use. Anxiety may pre-exist alcohol or sedative dependence, which then acts to perpetuate or worsen the underlying anxiety disorder. Someone experiencing the toxic effects of recreational alcohol use or chronic sedative use will not benefit from other therapies or medications for underlying psychiatric conditions, as they do not address the root cause of the symptoms. Recovery from sedative symptoms may temporarily worsen during alcohol withdrawal or benzodiazepine withdrawal.

=== Biological explanations ===
Irregular norepinephrine activity has been detected in people who have panic attacks; related brain regions include the amygdala, ventromedial nucleus of the hypothalamus, and the locus ceruleus.

Decreased GABA-ergic tone, increased adenosine receptor function, increased cortisol levels, and disturbances in other hormones and/or neurotransmitters (e.g., norepinephrine). Further, a study in first degree relatives showed evidence of genetic associations. Differing proposed causes look at chromosomal regions 13q, 14q, 22q, and 4q31-q34 as possible associations to heritability. Prepulse inhibition is reduced in patients with panic disorder.

== Mechanism ==
The neuroanatomy of panic disorder largely overlaps with that of most anxiety disorders. Neuropsychological, neurosurgical, and neuroimaging studies implicate the insula, amygdala, hippocampus, anterior cingulate cortex (ACC), lateral prefrontal cortex, and periaqueductal grey. During acute panic attacks, viewing emotionally charged words, and rest, most studies find elevated blood flow or metabolism. However, the observation of amygdala hyperactivity is not entirely consistent, especially in studies that evoke panic attacks chemically. Hippocampus hyperactivity has been observed during rest and viewing emotionally charged pictures, which has been hypothesized to be related to memory retrieval bias towards anxious memories. Insula hyperactivity during the onset of and over the course of acute panic episodes is thought to be related to abnormal introceptive processes; the perception that bodily sensations are "wrong" is a transdiagnostic finding (i.e. found across multiple anxiety disorders), and may be related to insula dysfunction. Rodent and human studies heavily implicate the periaqueductal grey in generating fear responses, and abnormalities related to the structure and metabolism in the PAG have been reported in panic disorder. The frontal cortex is implicated in panic disorder by multiple lines of evidence. Damage to the dorsal ACC has been reported to lead to panic disorder. Elevated ventral ACC and dorsolateral prefrontal cortex during symptom provocation and viewing emotional stimuli have also been reported, although findings are not consistent.

Researchers studying some individuals with panic disorder propose they may have a chemical imbalance within the limbic system and one of its regulatory chemicals GABA. The reduced production of GABA sends false information to the amygdala which regulates the body's "fight or flight" response mechanism and, in return, produces the physiological symptoms that lead to the disorder. Clonazepam, an anticonvulsant benzodiazepine with a long half-life, has been successful in keeping the condition under control.

Recently, researchers have begun to identify mediators and moderators of aspects of panic disorder. One such mediator is the partial pressure of carbon dioxide, which mediates the relationship between panic disorder patients receiving breathing training and anxiety sensitivity; thus, breathing training affects the partial pressure of carbon dioxide in a patient's arterial blood, which in turn lowers anxiety sensitivity. Another mediator is hypochondriacal concerns, which mediate the relationship between anxiety sensitivity and panic symptomatology; thus, anxiety sensitivity affects hypochondriacal concerns, which, in turn, affect panic symptomatology.

Perceived threat control has been identified as a moderator within panic disorder, moderating the relationship between anxiety sensitivity and agoraphobia; thus, the level of perceived threat control dictates the degree to which anxiety sensitivity results in agoraphobia. Another recently identified moderator of panic disorder is genetic variations in the gene coding for galanin; these genetic variations moderate the relationship between females with panic disorder and the level of severity of panic disorder symptomatology.

== Diagnosis ==
The DSM-IV-TR diagnostic criteria for panic disorder require unexpected, recurrent panic attacks, followed in at least one instance by at least a month of a significant and related behavior change, a persistent concern of more attacks, or a worry about the attack's consequences. There are two types, one with and one without agoraphobia. Diagnosis is excluded by attacks due to a drug or medical condition, or by panic attacks that are better accounted for by other mental disorders.
The ICD-10 diagnostic criteria:
The essential feature is recurrent attacks of severe anxiety (panic), which are not restricted to any particular situation or set of circumstances and are therefore unpredictable.
The dominant symptoms include:

- sudden onset of palpitations
- chest pain or tightness
- shortness of breath or hyperventilation
- choking sensations
- dizziness
- feelings of unreality (depersonalization or derealization)
- secondary fear of dying, losing control, or going mad

Panic disorder should not be given as the main diagnosis if the person has a depressive disorder at the time the attacks start; in these circumstances, the panic attacks are probably secondary to depression.

The Panic Disorder Severity Scale (PDSS) is a questionnaire for measuring the severity of panic disorder.

== Treatment ==
Panic disorder is a serious health problem that, in many cases, can be successfully treated, although there is no known cure. Identification of treatments that engender as full a response as possible, and can minimize relapse, is imperative. Cognitive behavioral therapy and positive self-talk specific for panic are the treatments of choice for panic disorder. Several studies show that 85–90% of panic disorder patients treated with CBT recover completely from their panic attacks within 12 weeks. When cognitive behavioral therapy is not an option, pharmacotherapy can be used. SSRIs are considered a first-line pharmacotherapeutic option.

=== Psychotherapy ===
Panic disorder is not the same as phobic symptoms, although many phobias commonly result from panic disorder. CBT and one tested form of psychodynamic psychotherapy have been shown efficacious in treating panic disorder with and without agoraphobia. Several randomized clinical trials have shown that CBT achieves reported panic-free status in 70–90% of patients about 2 years after treatment.

A 2009 Cochrane review found little evidence concerning the efficacy of psychotherapy in combination with benzodiazepines, such that recommendations could not be made.

Symptom inductions generally occur for one minute and may include:

- Intentional hyperventilation – creates lightheadedness, derealization, blurred vision, dizziness
- Spinning in a chair – creates dizziness, disorientation
- Straw breathing – creates dyspnea, airway constriction
- Breath holding – creates sensation of being out of breath
- Running in place – creates increased heart rate, respiration, perspiration
- Body tensing – creates feelings of being tense and vigilant

Another form of psychotherapy that has shown effectiveness in controlled clinical trials is panic-focused psychodynamic psychotherapy, which focuses on the role of dependency, separation anxiety, and anger in causing panic disorder. The underlying theory posits that due to biochemical vulnerability, traumatic early experiences, or both, people with panic disorder have a fearful dependence on others for their sense of security, which leads to separation anxiety and defensive anger. Therapy involves first exploring the stressors that lead to panic episodes, then probing the psychodynamics of the conflicts underlying panic disorder and the defense mechanisms that contribute to the attacks, with attention to transference and separation anxiety issues implicated in the therapist-patient relationship.

Comparative clinical studies suggest that muscle relaxation techniques and breathing exercises are not efficacious in reducing panic attacks. Breathing exercises may increase the risk of relapse.

Appropriate treatment by an experienced professional can prevent panic attacks or at least substantially reduce their severity and frequency, bringing significant relief to 70–90% of people with panic disorder. Relapses may occur, but they can often be effectively treated just like the initial episode.

vanApeldoorn, F.J. et al. (2011) demonstrated the additive value of a combined treatment incorporating an SSRI treatment intervention with cognitive behavior therapy (CBT). Gloster et al. (2011) went on to examine the role of the therapist in CBT. They randomized patients into two groups: one being treated with CBT in a therapist-guided environment, and the second receiving CBT through instruction only, with no therapist-guided sessions. The findings indicated that the first group had a somewhat better response rate, but that both groups demonstrated a significant improvement in the reduction of panic symptomatology. These findings lend credibility to the application of CBT programs to patients who are unable to access therapeutic services due to financial, or geographic inaccessibility. Koszycky et al. (2011) discuss the efficacy of self-administered cognitive behavioural therapy (SCBT) in situations where patients are unable to retain the services of a therapist. Their study demonstrates that it is possible for SCBT in combination with an SSRI to be as effective as therapist-guided CBT with an SSRI. Each of these studies contributes to a new avenue of research that allows effective treatment interventions to be made more easily accessible to the population.

==== Cognitive behavioral therapy ====
Cognitive behavioral therapy encourages patients to confront the triggers that induce their anxiety. By facing the very cause of the anxiety, it is thought to help diminish the irrational fears that are causing the issues to begin with. The therapy begins with calming breathing exercises, followed by noting the changes in physical sensations felt as soon as anxiety begins to enter the body. Many clients are encouraged to keep journals. In other cases, therapists may try and induce feelings of anxiety so that the root of the fear can be identified.

Comorbid clinical depression, personality disorders and alcohol abuse are known risk factors for treatment failure.

As with many disorders, having a support structure of family and friends who understand the condition can help increase the rate of recovery. During an attack, it is not uncommon for the affected to develop irrational, immediate fear, which can often be dispelled by a supporter who is familiar with the condition. For more serious or active treatment, there are support groups for those with anxiety, which can help people understand and deal with the disorder.

Current treatment guidelines American Psychiatric Association and the American Medical Association primarily recommend either cognitive-behavioral therapy or one of a variety of psychopharmacological interventions. Some evidence exists supporting the superiority of combined treatment approaches.

Another option is self-help based on principles of cognitive behavioral therapy. Using a book or a website, a person does the kinds of exercises that would be used in therapy, but they do it on their own, perhaps with some email or phone support from a therapist. A systematic analysis of trials testing this kind of self-help found that websites, books, and other materials based on cognitive-behavioral therapy could help some people. The best-studied conditions are panic disorder and social phobia.

==== Interoceptive techniques ====
Interoceptive exposure is sometimes used for panic disorder. People's interoceptive triggers of anxiety are evaluated one by one before conducting interoceptive exposures, such as addressing palpitation sensitivity via light exercise. Despite evidence of its clinical efficacy, this practice is reportedly used by only 12–20% of psychotherapists. Potential reasons for this underutilization include "lack of training sites, logistical hurdles (e.g., occasional need for exposure durations longer than a standard therapy session), policies against conducting exposures outside of the workplace setting, and perhaps most tellingly, negative therapist beliefs (e.g., that interoceptive exposures are unethical, intolerable, or even harmful)."

=== Medication ===
Appropriate medications are effective for panic disorder. Selective serotonin reuptake inhibitors are first-line treatments rather than benzodiazapines due to concerns with the latter regarding tolerance, dependence, and abuse. Although there is little evidence that pharmacological interventions can directly alter phobias, few studies have been performed, and medication treatment of panic makes phobia treatment far easier (for example in Europe where only 8% of patients receive appropriate treatment).

Medications can include:

- Antidepressants (SSRIs, MAOIs, tricyclic antidepressants and norepinephrine reuptake inhibitors): The most common SSRIs used while treating panic disorder include Prozac (fluoxetine), Luvox (fluvoxamine), Zoloft (sertraline), Cipralex/Lexapro (escitalopram) and Paxil (paroxetine). These have been reported as the most effective in preventing panic attacks. The most researched and support tricyclic antidepressants are Tofranil and Anafranil. Other tricyclic antidepressants used for treatment include Pamelor, Norpramin, and Elavil. While these are potentially helpful in treating panic disorder, research has not been as conclusive when compared to the two previously mentioned medications. Monoamine oxidase inhibitors (MAOIs) can be used as a second-line or third-line treatment, but have shown limited efficacy in the treatment of panic disorder, and also carry significant risks of adverse effects and medication interactions.
- Benzodiazepines): The American Psychiatric Association (APA) states that benzodiazepines can be effective for the treatment of panic disorder and recommends that the choice of whether to use benzodiazepines, antidepressants with anti-panic properties, or psychotherapy should be based on the individual patient's history and characteristics. Other experts believe that benzodiazepines are best avoided due to the risks of the development of tolerance and physical dependence. The World Federation of Societies of Biological Psychiatry, say that benzodiazepines should not be used as a first-line treatment option but are an option for treatment-resistant cases of panic disorder. Despite increasing focus on the use of antidepressants and other agents for the treatment of anxiety as recommended best practice, benzodiazepines have remained a commonly used medication for panic disorder. They reported that in their view there is insufficient evidence to recommend one treatment over another for panic disorder. The APA noted that while benzodiazepines have the advantage of a rapid onset of action, that this is offset by the risk of developing a benzodiazepine dependence. The National Institute for Clinical Excellence came to a different conclusion, they pointed out the problems of using uncontrolled clinical trials to assess the effectiveness of pharmacotherapy and based on placebo-controlled research they concluded that benzodiazepines were not effective in the long-term for panic disorder and recommended that benzodiazepines not be used for longer than 4 weeks for panic disorder. Instead, NICE clinical guidelines recommend alternative pharmacotherapeutic or psychotherapeutic interventions. When compared to placebos, benzodiazepines demonstrate possible superiority in the short term but the evidence is low quality with limited applicability to clinical practice.

=== Other treatments ===
For some people, anxiety can be greatly reduced by discontinuing the use of caffeine. Anxiety can temporarily increase during caffeine withdrawal.

== Epidemiology ==
Age-standardized disability-adjusted life year rates for panic disorder per 100,000 inhabitants in 2004: no data less than 95 95–96.5 96.5–98 98–99.5 99.5–101 101–102.5 102.5–104 104–105.5 105.5–107 107–108.5 108.5–110 more than 110

Panic disorder typically begins during early adulthood; roughly half of all people who have panic disorder develop the condition between the ages of 17 and 24, especially those subjected to traumatic experiences. However, some studies suggest that the majority of young people affected for the first time are between the ages of 25 and 30. Women are twice as likely as men to develop panic disorder.

Panic disorder can continue for months or years, depending on how and when treatment is sought. If left untreated, it may worsen to the point where one's life is seriously affected by panic attacks and by attempts to avoid or conceal the condition. Many people have had problems with personal relationships, education, and employment while struggling to cope with panic disorder. Some people with panic disorder may conceal their condition because of the stigma of mental illness. In some individuals, symptoms may occur frequently for months or years, then many years may pass with little or no symptoms. In some cases, the symptoms persist at the same level indefinitely. There is also some evidence that many individuals (especially those who develop symptoms at an early age) may experience a complete cessation of symptoms later in life (e.g., over age 50).

In 2000, the World Health Organization found prevalence and incidence rates for panic disorder to be very similar across the globe. Age-standardized prevalence per 100,000 ranged from 309 in Africa to 330 in East Asia for men and from 613 in Africa to 649 in North America, Oceania, and Europe for women.

== Children ==
A retrospective study has shown that 40% of adult panic disorder patients reported that their disorder began before the age of 20. In an article examining the phenomenon of panic disorder in youth, Diler et al. (2004) found that only a few past studies have examined the occurrence of juvenile panic disorder. They report that these studies have found that the symptoms of juvenile panic disorder almost replicate those found in adults (e.g. heart palpitations, sweating, trembling, hot flashes, nausea, abdominal distress, and chills). The anxiety disorders co-exist with staggeringly high numbers of other mental disorders in adults. The same comorbid disorders that are seen in adults are also reported in children with juvenile panic disorder. Last and Strauss (1989) examined a sample of 17 adolescents with panic disorder and found high rates of comorbid anxiety disorders, major depressive disorder, and conduct disorders. Eassau et al. (1999) also found a high number of comorbid disorders in a community-based sample of adolescents with panic attacks or juvenile panic disorder. Within the sample, adolescents were found to have the following comorbid disorders: major depressive disorder (80%), dysthymic disorder (40%), generalized anxiety disorder (40%), somatoform disorders (40%), substance abuse (40%), and specific phobia (20%). Consistent with this previous work, Diler et al. (2004) found similar results in their study in which 42 youths with juvenile panic disorder were examined. Compared to non-panic anxiety disordered youths, children with panic disorder had higher rates of comorbid major depressive disorder and bipolar disorder.

Children differ from adolescents and adults in their interpretation and ability to express their experience. Like adults, children experience physical symptoms including accelerated heart rate, sweating, trembling or shaking, shortness of breath, nausea or abdominal pain, dizziness or light-headedness. In addition, children also experience cognitive symptoms like fear of dying, feelings of being detached from oneself, and feelings of losing control or going crazy. Children are often unable to articulate these higher-order manifestations of fear; they simply feel that something is wrong and that they are very afraid. Children can only describe physical symptoms. They have not yet developed the ability to put these symptoms together and label them as fear. Parents often feel helpless when they watch their child suffer. They can help children give a name to their experience, and empower them to overcome the fear they are experiencing

The role of the parent in treatment and intervention for children diagnosed with panic disorder is discussed by McKay & Starch (2011). They point out that there are several levels at which parental involvement should be considered. The first involves the initial assessment. Parents, as well as the child, should be screened for attitudes and treatment goals, as well as for levels of anxiety or conflict in the home. The second involves the treatment process in which the therapist should meet with the family as a unit as frequently as possible. Ideally, all family members should be aware and trained in the process of cognitive behavior therapy (CBT) to encourage the child to rationalize and face fears rather than employ avoidant safety behaviors. McKay & Storch (2011) suggest training/modeling of therapeutic techniques and in-session involvement of the parents in the treatment of children to enhance treatment efficacy.

Despite the evidence pointing to the existence of early-onset panic disorder, the DSM-IV-TR currently only recognizes six anxiety disorders in children: separation anxiety disorder, generalized anxiety disorder, specific phobia, obsessive-compulsive disorder, social anxiety disorder (a.k.a. social phobia), and post-traumatic stress disorder. Panic disorder is notably excluded from this list.
