= University of Navarra =

Private university in Pamplona, Spain

Coordinates: 42°48′05″N 1°39′35″W

- Spanish: Universidad de Navarra; Basque: Nafarroako Unibertsitatea
- Latin: Universitas Studiorum Navarrensis
- Type: Private
- Established: 17 October 1952
- Affiliations: CRUE, CASE, Opus Dei, Catholic Church
- Religious affiliation: Roman Catholic
- Chancellor: Fernando Ocáriz Braña
- President: María Iraburu Elizalde
- Faculty: 1,175 (6,308 employees)
- Students: 12,779 (2021–2022)
- Undergraduates: 8,924
- Postgraduates: 1,076
- Location: Pamplona, Spain
- Campus: Seven campuses: Pamplona (279.2 acres), San Sebastián, Madrid, Barcelona, Munich, New York City and São Paulo
- Website: www.unav.edu

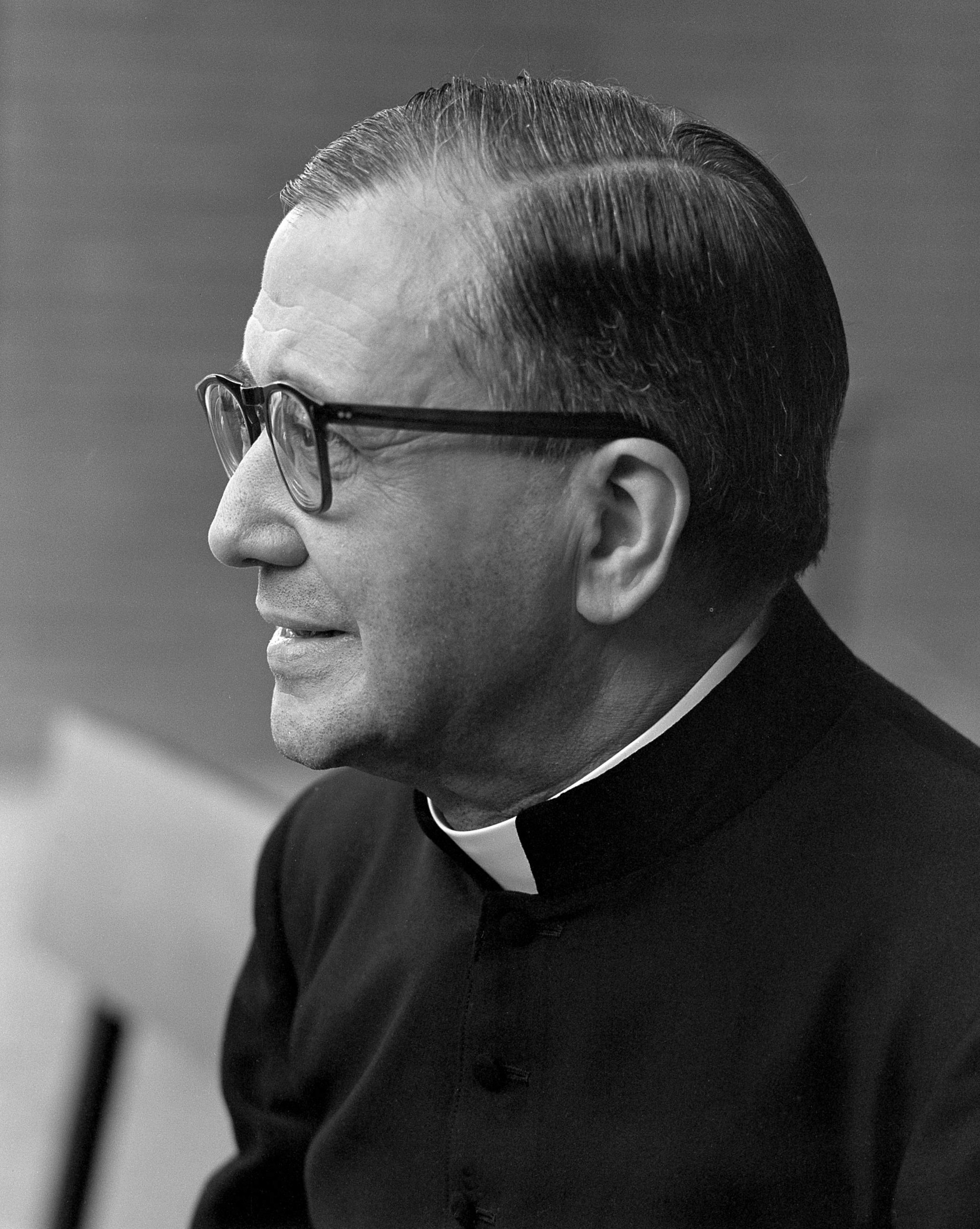
San Josemaría Escrivá, founder of the University of Navarra & Opus Dei

The University of Navarra is a prestigious private Catholic research university located on the southeast border of Pamplona, Navarre, Spain. It was founded in 1952 by Saint Josemaría Escrivá de Balaguer, the founder of Opus Dei, as a corporate work of the apostolate of Opus Dei. The University of Navarra is among the best private universities in Spain. The University of Navarra was third in the "European Teaching Rankings of 2019" following the Universities of Oxford and Cambridge by Times Higher Education's International Rankings. Moreover, the university is ranked #1 in the "CYD Ranking" list of Spanish universities in 2026. It holds a particularly respected position in the fields of business, economics, medicine, and healthcare.

Through its six campuses (Pamplona - Iruña, Donostia - San Sebastian, Madrid, Barcelona, Munich and New York City), the university confers 35 official degrees, 13 dual degrees and more than 38 master's programs in 14 faculties, 2 university schools, 17 institutes, its graduate business school, IESE ("Instituto de Estudios Superiores de la Empresa"; in English: "International Graduate School of Management" or "Institute of Higher Business Studies"), Instituto Superior de Secretariado y Administracion (ISSA) (in English: Superior Institute of Secretarial and Administrative Studies), and other centers and institutions.

The university also runs a teaching hospital, CUN, where 2,045 qualified professionals handle more than 100,000 patients each year, and a medical center research, CIMA, that focuses on four main areas: Oncology, Neuroscience, Cardiovascular Sciences, and Gene Therapy and Hepatology. CIMA has been accredited as a Severo Ochoa Center of Excellence in 2026.

== History ==
The institution was founded as the Estudio General de Navarra on 17 October 1952, with the encouragement of Josemaría Escrivá. It began as a School of Law with 48 students and eight professors, under the direction of Ismael Sánchez Bella. The founder described the ideals he wanted to transmit in the university:

We want learned men to be formed here, with a Christian understanding of life; we want this environment, suitable for quiet reflection, to cultivate science rooted in its most solid principles, so that this light might shine over all the roads of knowledge

— San Josemaría Escrivá de Balaguer in 1960 in the ceremony of the award of the title of adoptive son of the city of Pamplona

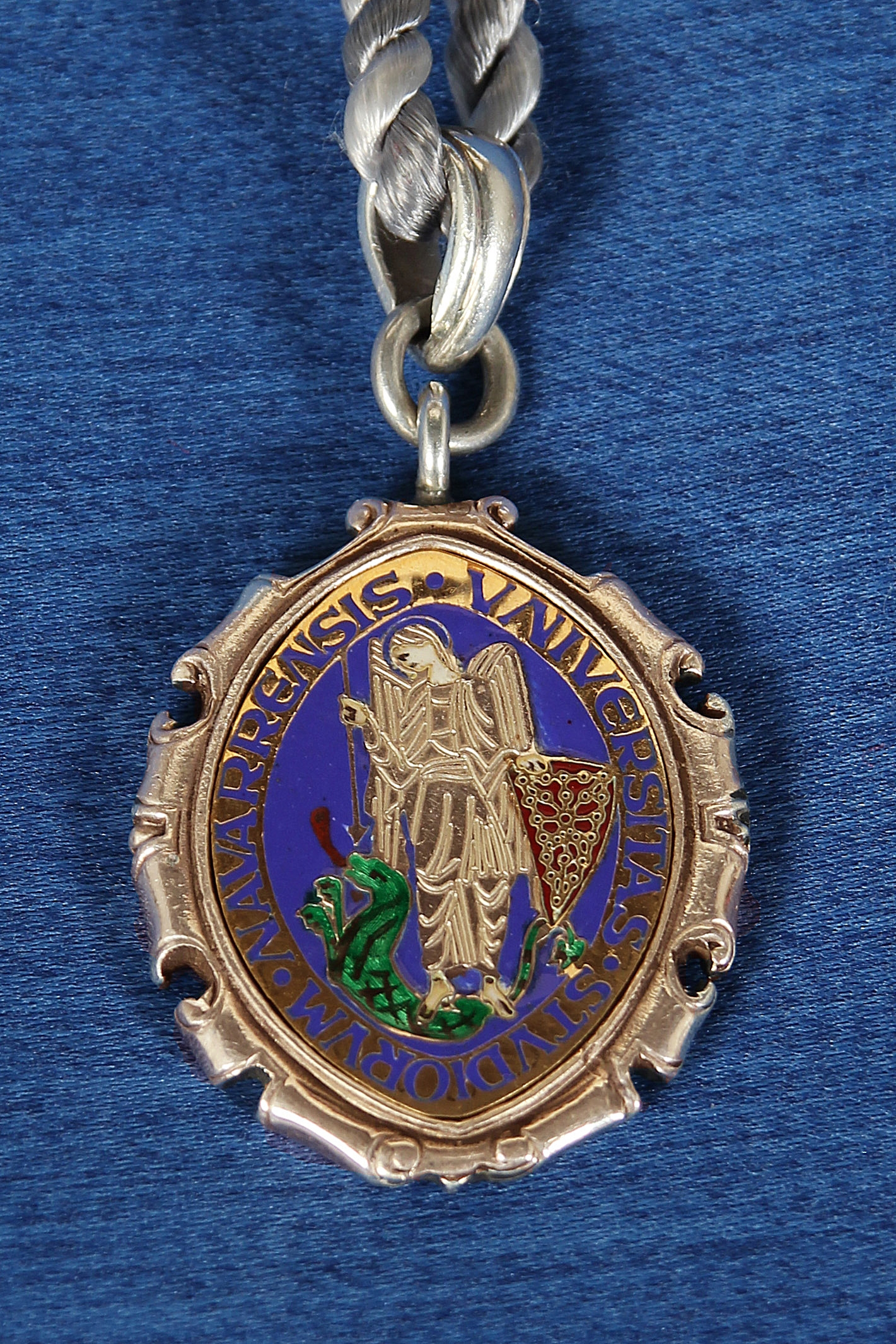
Medal of the University of Navarra

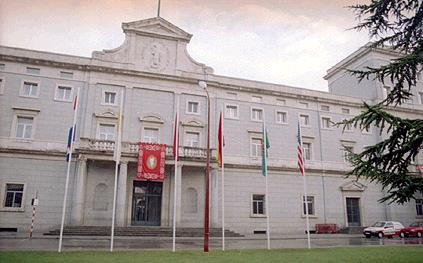
Historical Central building of the University of Navarra

After the foundation of the Faculty of Philosophy in 1955 and the Business School, IESE, in 1958, the Estudio General de Navarra was established as a university by The Holy See on 6 August 1960, and Escrivá was designated as the Great Chancellor. The university received an official accreditation from the Spanish State, on 8 September 1962.

In the 1960s and 70s, when modern clinical medicine in Europe was still in its infancy, Clínica Universidad de Navarra (CUN) performed some of the first kidney and liver transplants in Spain, initiating the institutionalization of modern transplant surgery and clinical oncology in the country.

At a time when European industry was largely unreceptive to American management models following World War II, IESE Business School - part of UNAV - launched Europe’s first two-year, full-time MBA program in partnership with Harvard Business School. This move served as a turning point that transformed the curricula and the culture of executive development across all business schools in continental Europe.

Spain’s Democratic Transition and Constitutional Architecture (1975–1978):

During Spain’s transition to democracy following the Franco dictatorship a pivotal juncture in European political history, if not on a global scale—academics from the UNAV Faculty of Law played a direct role in drafting the legal framework for the new constitution, particularly the sections concerning the system of autonomous regions and fundamental rights.

Until 2013, a "low-fat diet" was considered the gold standard for heart health globally (especially in the United States). The PREDIMED study - in which UNAV played a key role - demonstrated, with definitive clinical evidence, that a Mediterranean diet rich in fats (such as extra virgin olive oil and nuts) actually reduces the risk of heart attack and stroke by 30%. This finding led to a fundamental shift in the guidelines issued by the World Health Organization (WHO) and the American Heart Association (AHA).

== Students ==
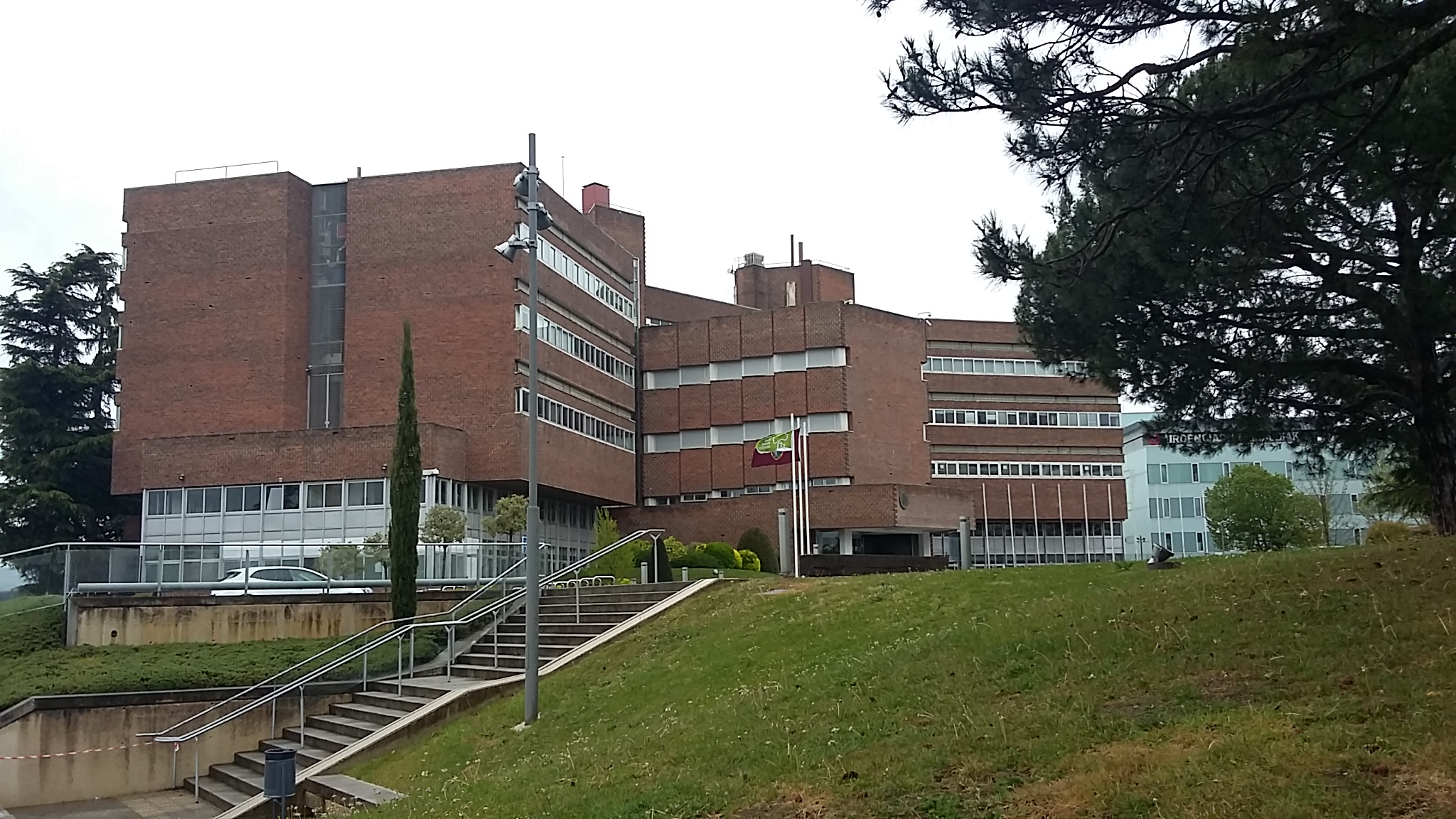
The Hexagon Building

In 2023, the university has a total of 12,054 students (1,758 international); 9,207 of whom are pursuing a bachelor's degree, 2,807 of whom are master's degree students, and 1,011 PhD students.

In addition, it has agreements with other universities, including the University of Washington (USA), the University of Hong Kong (Hong Kong) and the University of Edinburgh (UK).

== Campus ==
Most of the facilities and centers are located in Pamplona, with the exception of IESE Business School, which is based in Barcelona, Madrid, Munich, New York and Sao Paulo; the School of Engineering, Tecnun, based in Donostia-San Sebastián, and the ISEM Fashion Business School which is located in Madrid.

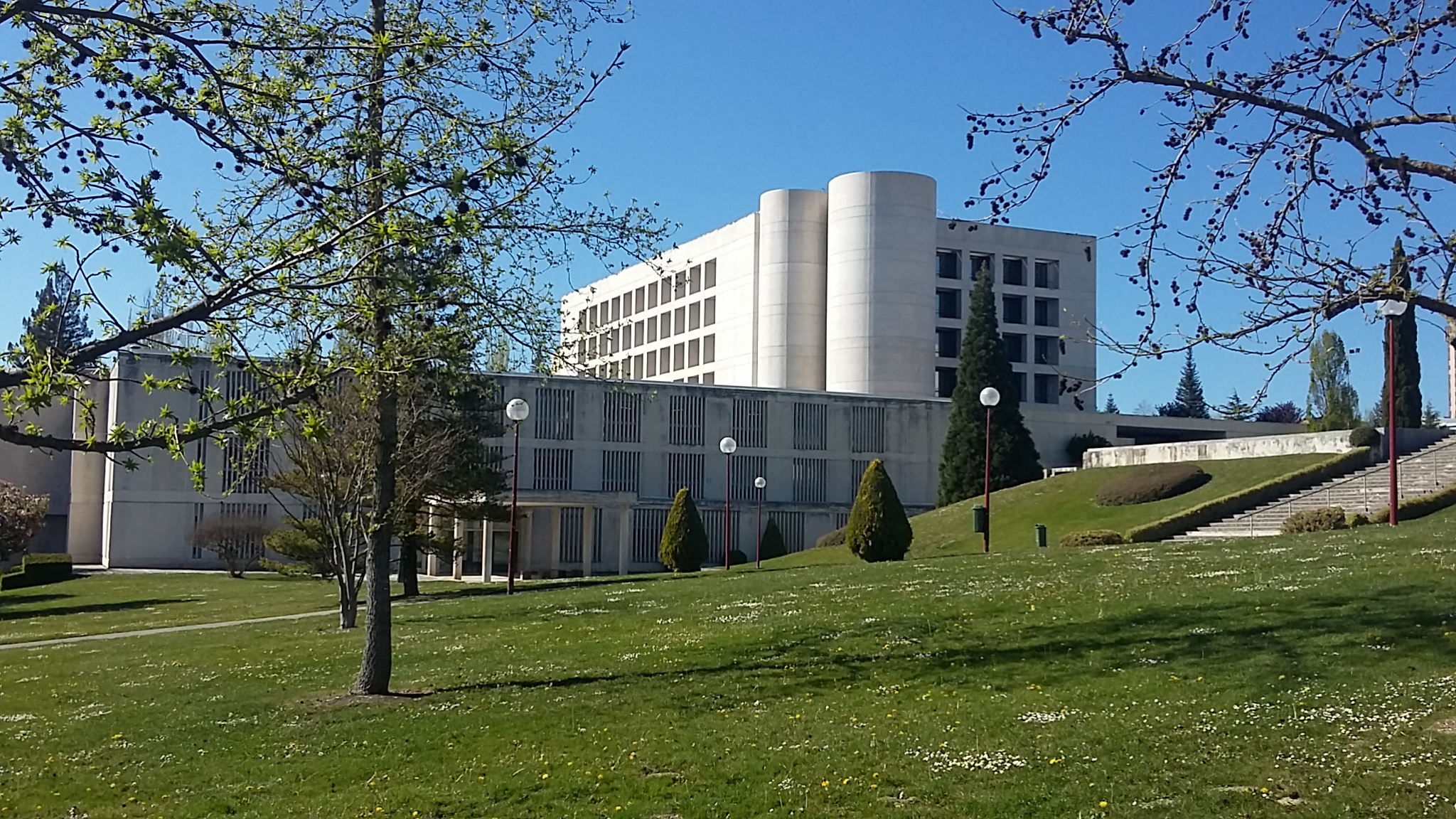
Central Library of UNAV

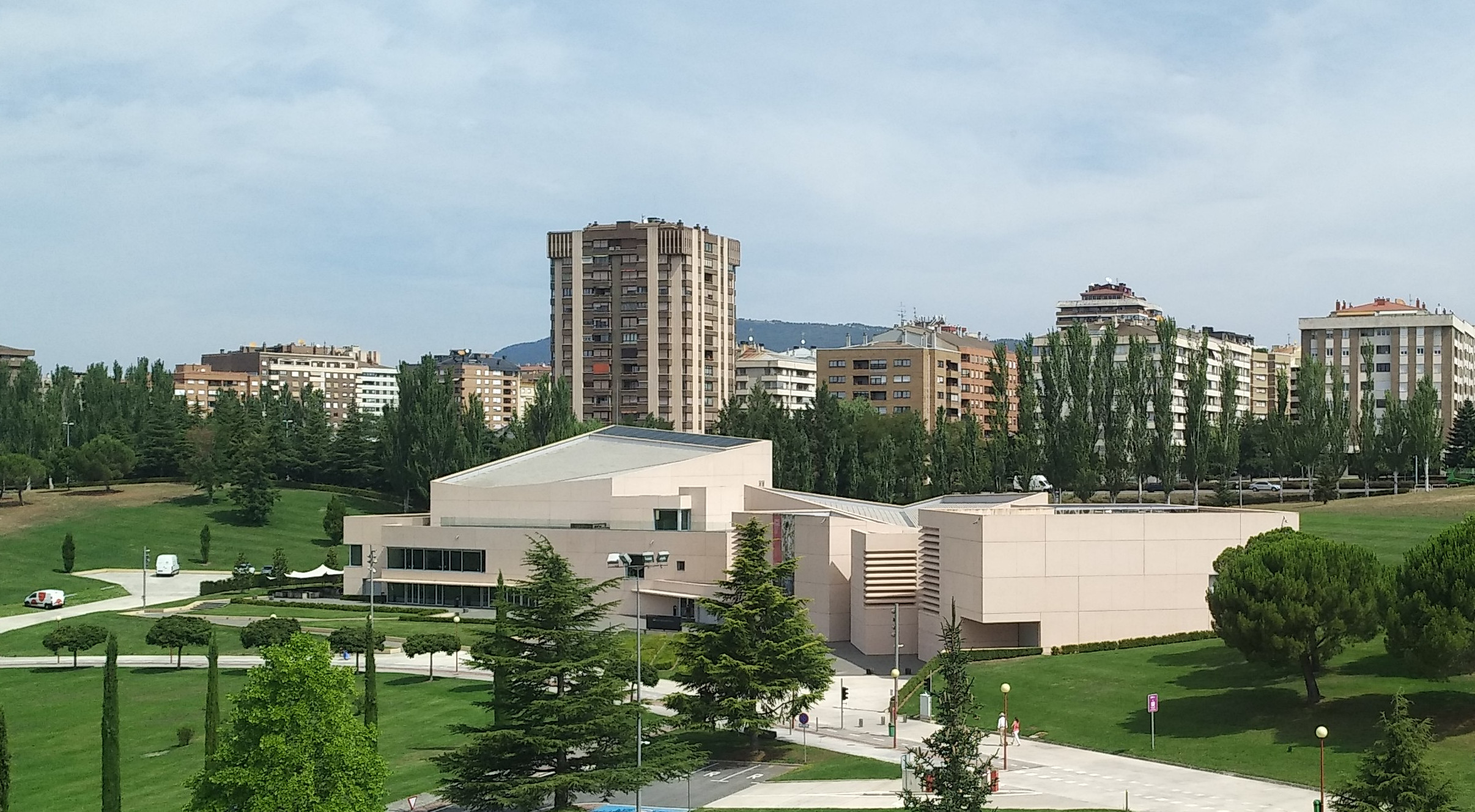
University Museum

In January 2015, the Museum of the University of Navarra was inaugurated by King Felipe VI and houses a collection donated to the university by María Josefa Huarte Beaumont. This collection, regarded as one of the greatest collections of contemporary art in Spain, includes works by Pablo Picasso and Wassily Kandinsky, among other artists. The architect in charge of the project was Rafael Moneo.

== Research ==
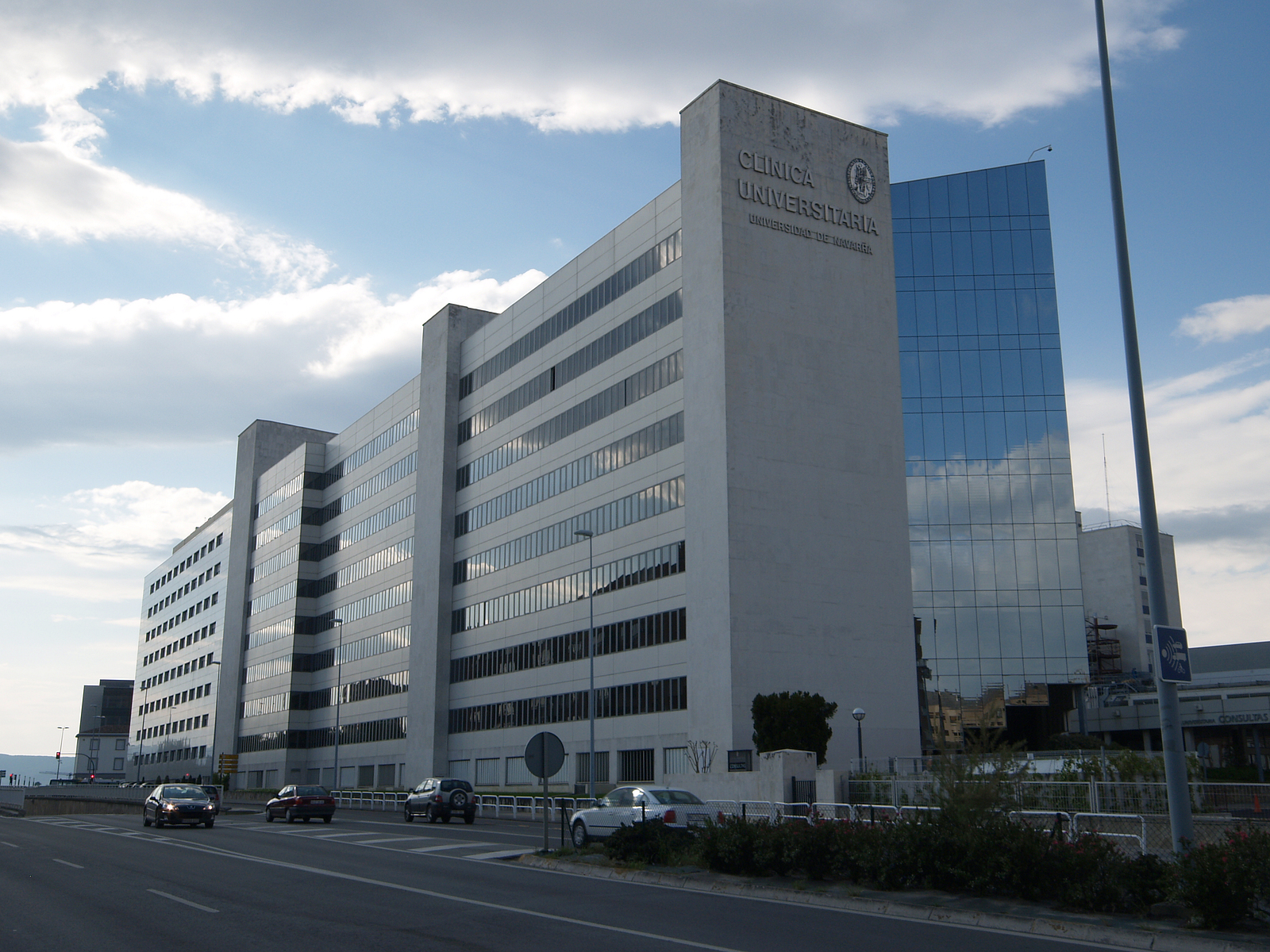
UNAV Medical School

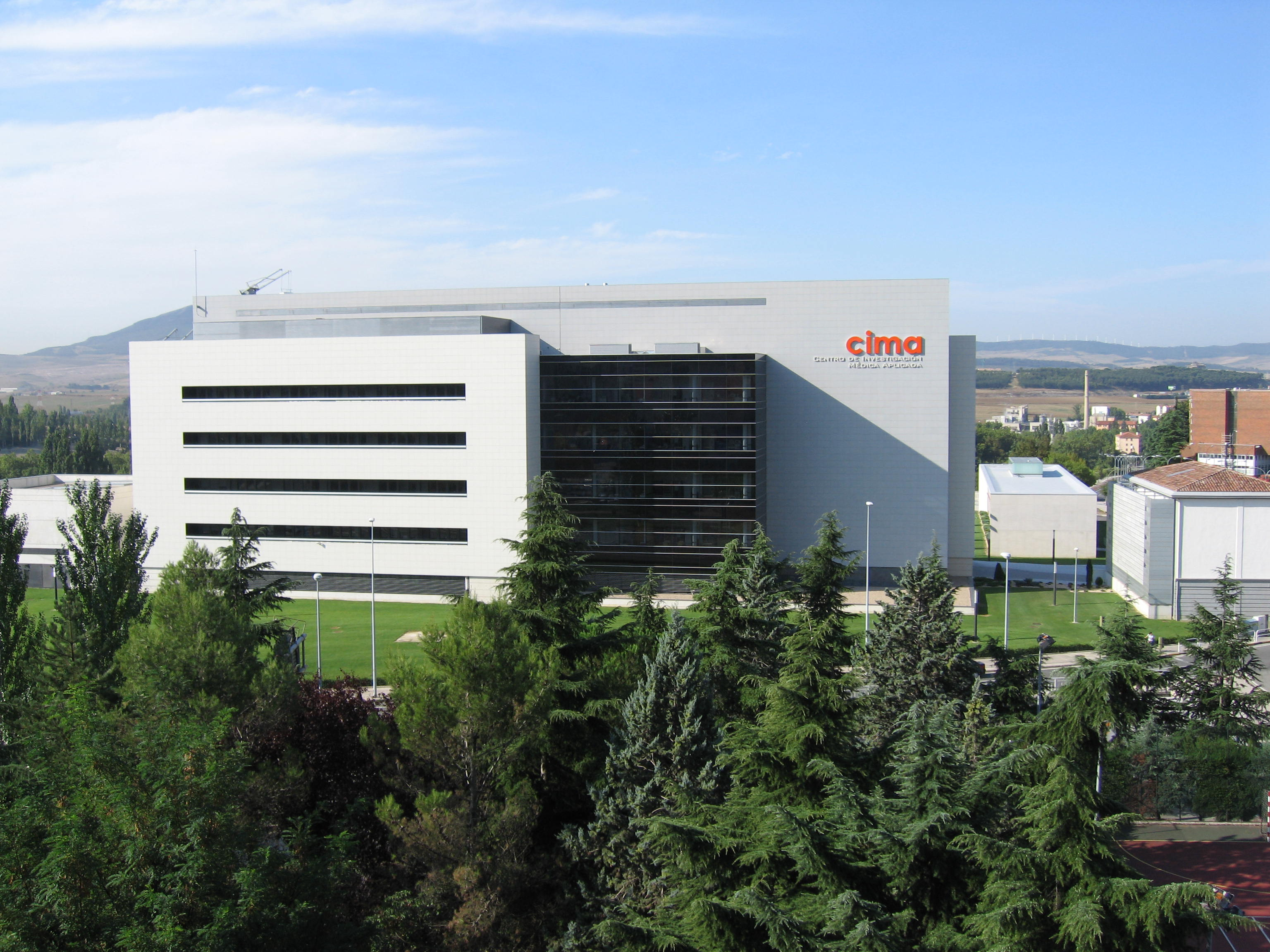
CIMA (Center for Applied Medical Research)

The university faculties and schools have thousands of researchers in different areas. The 8 centers and 17 institutes, located in the five campuses, carry out their research in the fields of Science and the Humanities, as well as the University Clinic of Navarra, the Center for Applied Medical Research and the Institute of Society and Culture.

=== Core Research Institues & Centers ===
- Institute for Culture and Society (ICS): UNAV's main research center for the humanities and social sciences, addressing social challenges such as youth mental health, public discourse, emotional culture, and human development.
- Institute of Biodiversity and Environment (BIOMA): Focuses on environmental science, biodiversity conservation, climate change, and sustainable ecosystems, working closely with the university's Science Museum.
- Institute of Data Science and Artificial Intelligence (DATAI): Conducts multidisciplinary research in big data, machine learning, and AI applications across health, engineering, economics, and society.
- Center for Nutrition Research (CIN): Specializes in human nutrition, metabolic diseases (such as obesity and diabetes), food science, and personalized dietary interventions.
- Institute of Nutrition and Health (INS): Integrates basic and clinical research on nutrition, food safety, and the prevention of chronic diet-related illnesses.
- Cancer Center Clínica Universidad de Navarra (CCUN): An integrated clinical and translational research hub dedicated to oncology, immunotherapy, and precision cancer treatments.
- Center for University Governance and Reputation: Studies higher education leadership, institutional strategy, transparency, and academic reputation management.
- St. Josemaría Escrivá Study Center (CEJE): Dedicated to historical, theological, and sociological research surrounding the life, teachings, and legacy of UNAV's founder.

=== Affiliated Research & Technology Centers ===
- CIMA (Center for Applied Medical Research): UNAV's flagship biomedical research center, focusing on translational medicine in oncology, neuroscience, cardiovascular diseases, and gene therapy.
- CEIT (Technology Center): A non-profit applied engineering research center linked to Tecnun (UNAV's School of Engineering), specializing in sustainable mobility, advanced manufacturing, materials, and circular economy.

=== Specialized Faculty-Linked Institutes ===
- Martín de Azpilcueta Institute: Affiliated with the School of Canon Law, focusing on ecclesiastical law and church-state relations.
- Human Rights Institute: Linked to the School of Law, dedicated to legal philosophy, fundamental rights, and international human rights frameworks.
- Institute of European and International Studies: Analyzes European integration, international relations, geopolitics, and global economic policy.

== Notable alumni ==
- Alessandra de Osma, wife of Prince Christian of Hanover
- Arancha González, former Spanish Minister of Foreign Affairs
- Pedro Morenés, former Spanish Minister of Defense and former ambassador of Spain to the United States
- Álex Pina, Spanish director and producer
- María Elósegui, Spanish judge at the European Court of Human Rights
- Pedro Sánchez, current Prime Minister of Spain
- Daniel Hadad, Argentine businessman
- Marek Kamiński, Polish polar explorer
- Iñaki Peralta, CEO of Sanitas and Bupa Europe and Latin America.
- Paola Binetti, Italian politician, psychologist and academic.
- Juan Antonio Samaranch, 1st Marquess of Saramanch, President of the International of Olympic Committee.
- António Pires de Limas, Exminister of the Economy of Portugal.
- José Horacio Gómez, Archbishop of Los Angeles.
- Celine Tendobi, Congolese doctor of obstetrics and gynecology.
- Nerea Irigoyen, virologist.
- Biola Javierre, biologist and biochemist.
- Idoia Ochoa, electrical engineer.

University ranking
International Global
	National	Europe	World
THE Ranking	4	113-142	251-300
QS Ranking	5	111-112	249
International Special
	National	Europe	World
QS Employability	1	19	71
THE Employability	2	19	45
THE Teaching	1	3	NA
International by Subjects
	National	Europe	World
FT MBA	1	3	4
FT Executive (Custom)	1	1	1
FT Executive (Open)	1	6	10
FT Executive (Combined)	1	1	1
The Economist MBA	1	1	1
THE Law	1	16	44
QS Law	4-6	45-65	101-150
QS Business	2	12	25
QS Biological Science	10	/	301-350
THE Business	3	59-66	151-175
QS Com & Media	1-2	17-38	51-100
QS Philosophy	2	23-55	51-100
QS Social Science & Management	1	25	71
QS Accounting & Finance	1	16	45
QS Nursing	1-2	13-39	51-100
QS Art & Design	3-5	39-58	101-150
"50 Carrera El Mundo" - National
	Public	Private	National
Global	NA	1	6
Business	NA	3	4
Business & Law	NA	1	3
Economics	NA	1	5
Medicine	NA	1	3
Architecture	NA	1	4
Audiovisual Com.	NA	1	1
Nutrition & Dietetics	NA	1	2
Nursing	NA	1	3
Pharmacy	NA	1	5
Journalism	NA	1	1
Electric engineering	NA	1	5
International Relations	NA	2	3
"CYD Ranking" - National
	Public	Private	National
Global	NA	1	3
Teaching & Learning	NA	5-8	8-11
Research	NA	1	4-5
International Outlook	NA	1-2	1-2
Business	NA	1	2
Economics	NA	1	5
Law	NA	3	4
Nursing	NA	1	1
Pharmacy	NA	1	1
