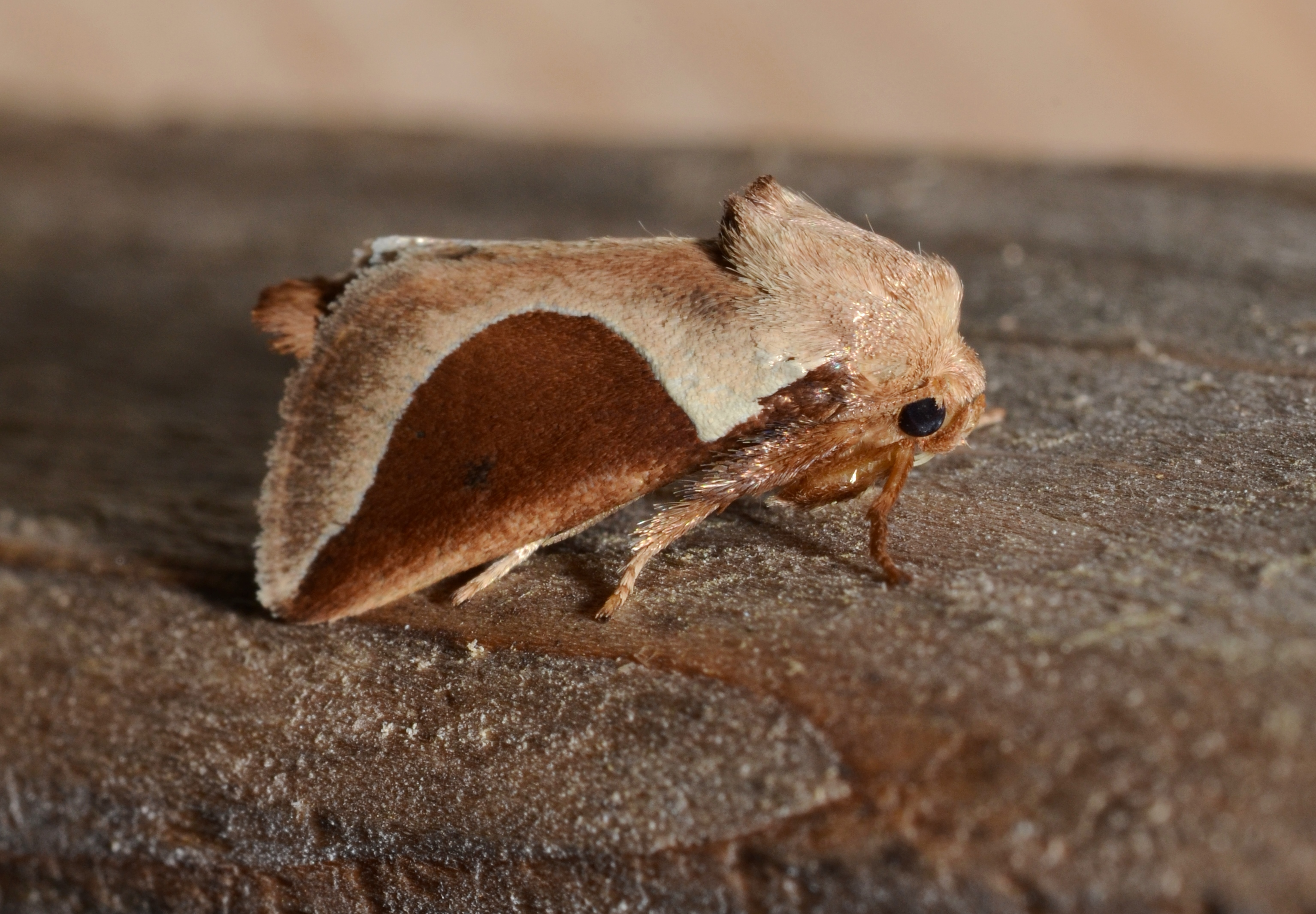
- Prolimacodes badia

Scientific classification
- Domain: Eukaryota
- Kingdom: Animalia
- Phylum: Arthropoda
- Class: Insecta
- Order: Lepidoptera
- Family: Limacodidae
- Genus: Prolimacodes; Schaus, 1896

= Prolimacodes =

Genus of moths

Prolimacodes is a genus of slug caterpillar moths in the moth family Limacodidae. The genus was erected by William Schaus in 1896. There are at least seven described species in Prolimacodes, found in North and Central America.

== Species ==
These species belong to the genus Prolimacodes:

- Prolimacodes badia (Hubner, 1822) (skiff moth)
- Prolimacodes dividua Dyar, 1907
- Prolimacodes lilalia Dyar, 1937
- Prolimacodes polygona Hering & Hopp, 1927
- Prolimacodes triangulifera Schaus, 1896
- Prolimacodes trigona Edwards, 1882 (western skiff moth)
- Prolimacodes undifera
