= Pan American School =

Pan American School or Panamerican School may refer to:

- Pan American School of Porto Alegre, an American international school in Petrópolis, Porto Alegre, Brazil
- Pan American International High School, Internationals Network for Public Schools
- Pan-American School of Agriculture or El Zamorano, San Antonio de Oriente, Francisco Morazán, Honduras

== See also ==
- PAS (disambiguation)
