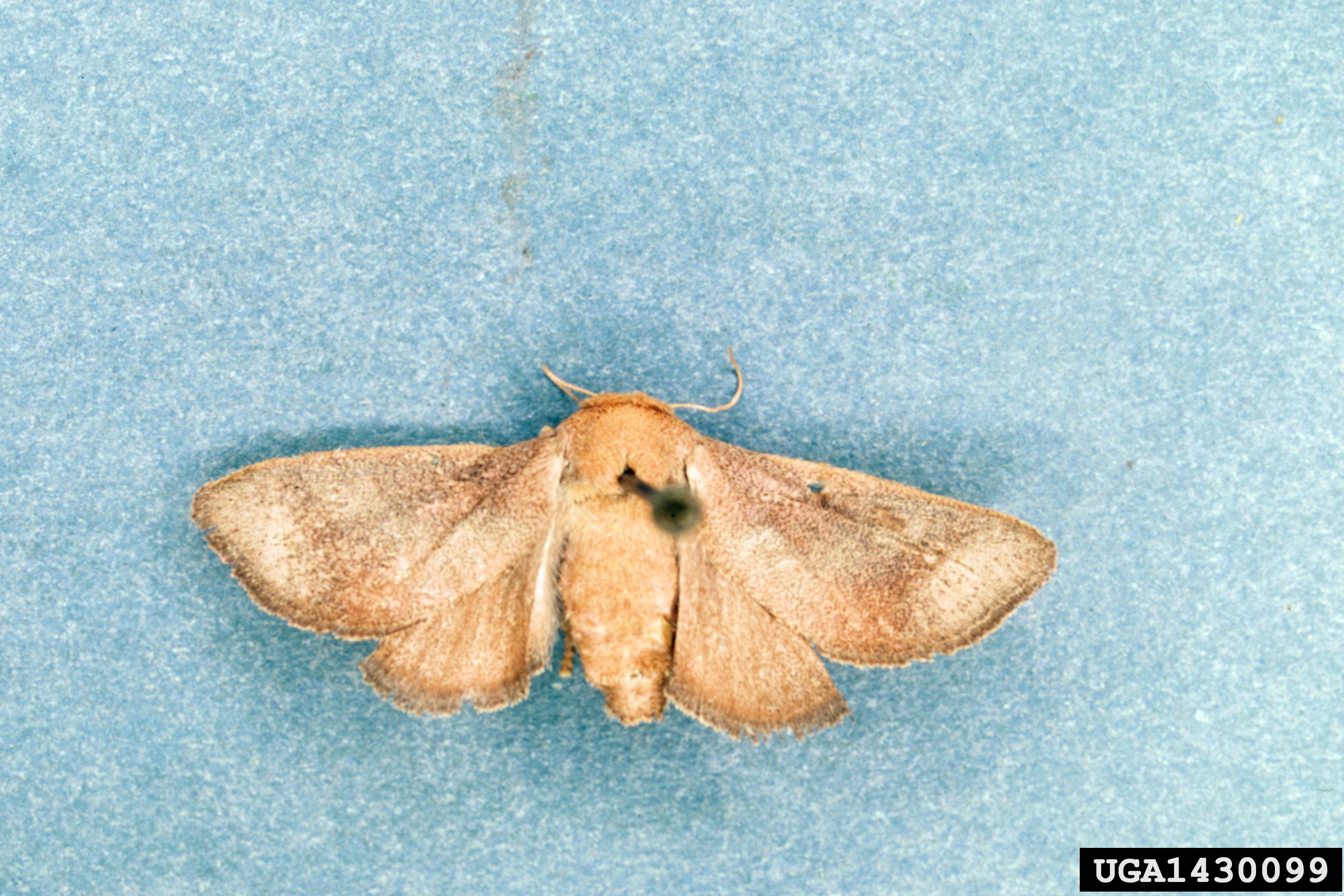
- Isa textula

Scientific classification
- Domain: Eukaryota
- Kingdom: Animalia
- Phylum: Arthropoda
- Class: Insecta
- Order: Lepidoptera
- Family: Limacodidae
- Genus: Isa; Packard, 1864

= Isa (moth) =

Genus of moths

Isa is a genus of moths in the family Limacodidae. It has 5 species.

== List of species ==
- Isa brusha Dyar, 1927
- Isa diana Druce, 1887
- Isa obscura Dyar, 1905
- Isa schaefferana Dyar, 1905
- Isa textula Herrich-Schäffer, 1854
