= Limited symptom attack =

Milder form of panic attack

A limited symptom attack (LSA), also referred to as a limited symptom panic attack (LPA), is a milder, less comprehensive form of panic attack, with fewer than four panic related symptoms being experienced (APA 1994). For example, a sudden episode of intense dizziness or trembling accompanied by fear that something terrible is about to happen. Many people with panic disorder have a mixture of full blown and limited symptom attacks. LSAs often manifest in anxiety disorders, phobias, panic disorder, and agoraphobia. However, experiencing an LSA is not necessarily indicative of a mental disorder. Often persons recovering from or being treated for panic attacks and panic disorder will experience LSAs.

== Signs and symptoms ==
According to the DSM-5-TR, during an LSA, fewer than four of the following symptoms would be experienced, in contrast to a full blown panic attack, which must include four or more symptoms.

- Palpitations, pounding heart, or accelerated heart rate
- Sweating
- Trembling or shaking
- Sensations of shortness of breath or smothering
- Feelings of choking
- Chest pain or discomfort
- Nausea or abdominal distress
- Feeling dizzy, unsteady, light-headed, or faint
- Chills or heat sensations
- Paresthesias (numbness or tingling sensations)
- Derealization (feelings of unreality) or depersonalization (being detached from oneself)
- Fear of losing control or "going crazy"
- Fear of dying

=== Duration ===
As with a panic attack, an LSA typically peaks in 10 minutes. However, attacks can be as short as one to five minutes or can form a series of episodes waxing and waning for a period of hours.
