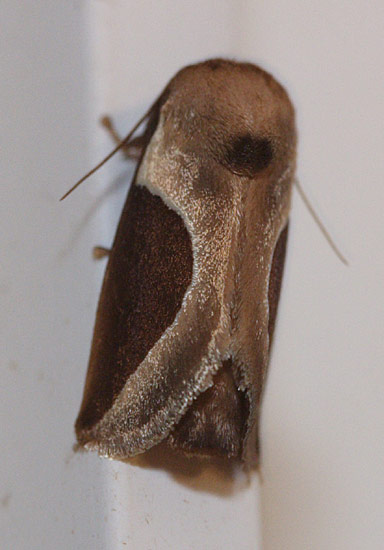

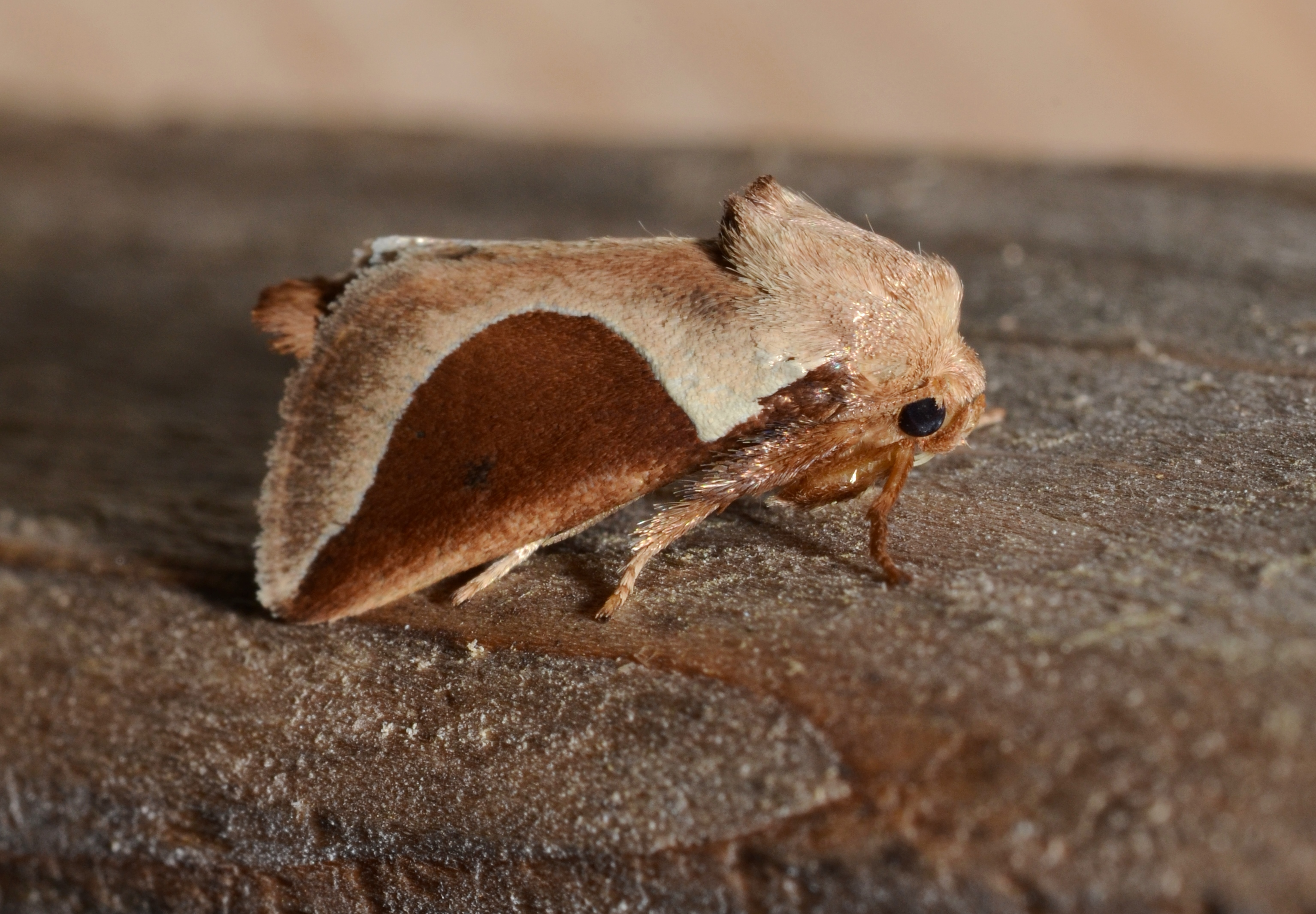

Scientific classification
- Domain: Eukaryota
- Kingdom: Animalia
- Phylum: Arthropoda
- Class: Insecta
- Order: Lepidoptera
- Family: Limacodidae
- Genus: Prolimacodes
- Species: P. badia

Binomial name
- Prolimacodes badia (Hübner, 1822)

Synonyms
- Limacodes scapha Harris, 1841; Limacodes undifera Walker, 1855; Eulimacodes scapha; Prolimacodes badia argentimacula

= Prolimacodes badia =

Species of moth

Prolimacodes badia, the skiff moth, is a moth of the family Limacodidae. It is found in North America from New Hampshire to Florida, west to southern Ontario, Missouri, Arkansas and Mississippi.

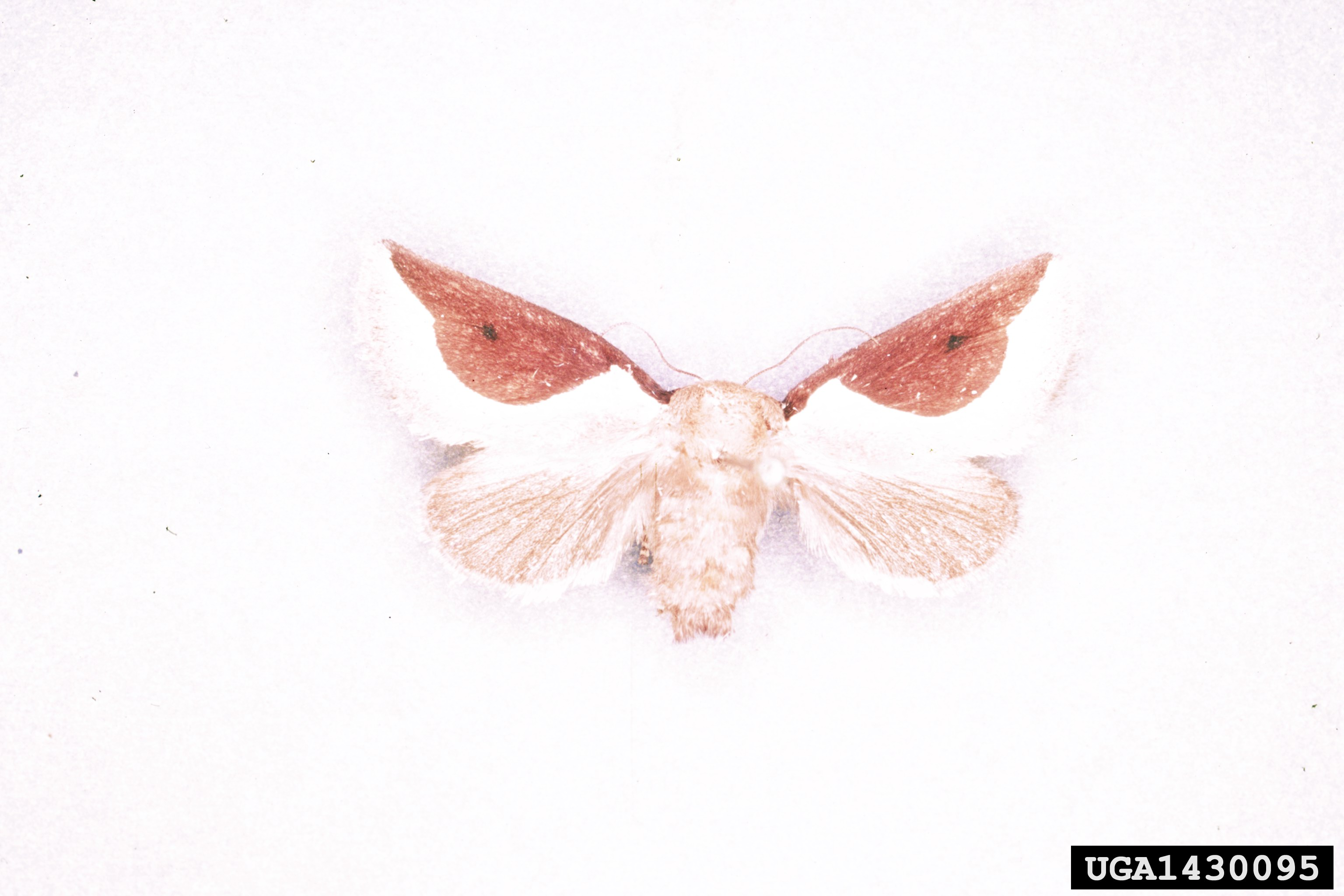
Mounted

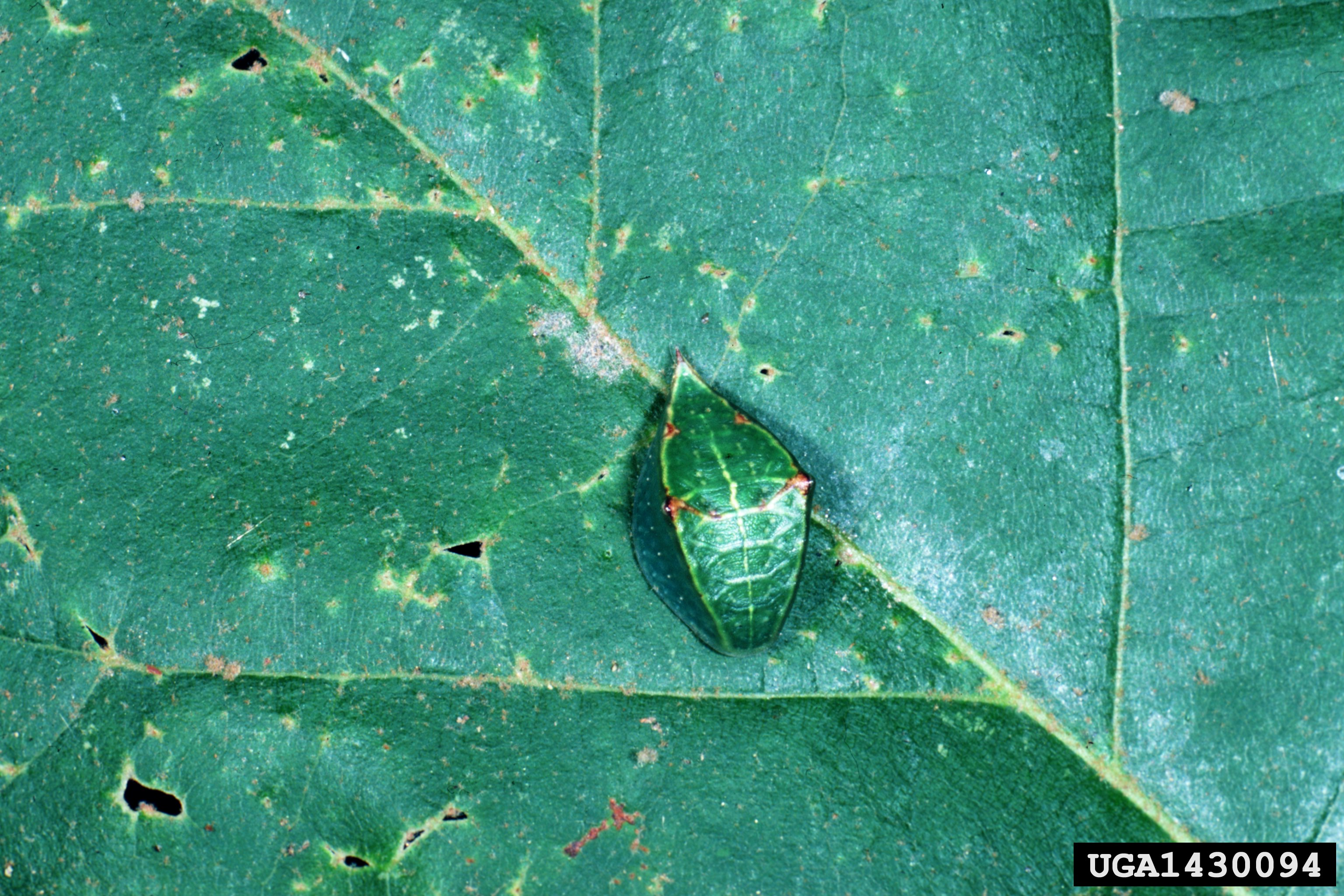
Larva

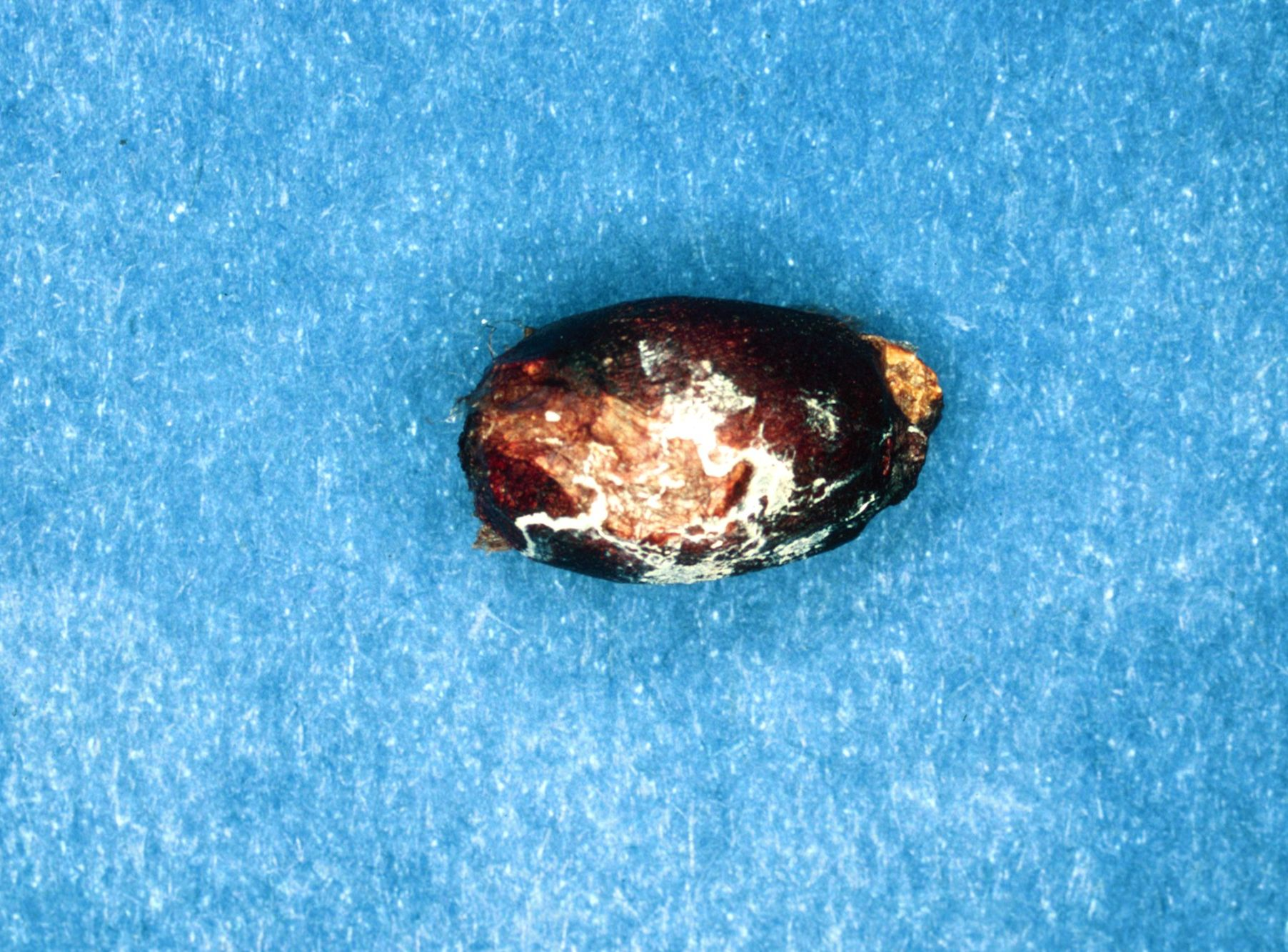
Pupa

The wingspan is 24–35 mm. Adults are on wing from May to September.

The larvae feed on the leaves of a wide variety of trees and shrubs, including birch, blueberry, cherry, chestnut, Ostrya virginiana, oak, poplar, Myrica gale and willow.
