= Instituto Superior de Secretariado y Administración =

Academic center in Spain

ISSA School of Management Assistants was founded in 1963 as the Superior Institute of Secretarial and Administrative Studies. It is part of the University of Navarra in Spain. It had been located in San Sebastián since its foundation in 1963, but is now in Pamplona. ISSA has always been the number-one Spanish educational institution to train Management Assistants at university level.

ISSA was housed for 50 years in San Sebastián in a building constructed by a Spanish aristocrat as his summerhouse in 1900. It was thus decorated with exquisite tapestries and carpets, computers, and state-of-the-art technology (Source).

The faculty in currently located in Pamplona in the Amigos' building, (sited in the main Campus of the University of Navarra )consists of 27 instructors, each having at least a bachelor's or doctorate degree. It offers the Bachelor's Degree in Management Assistance (Source), a degree that combines Business and Modern Languages.
