= International School Augsburg =

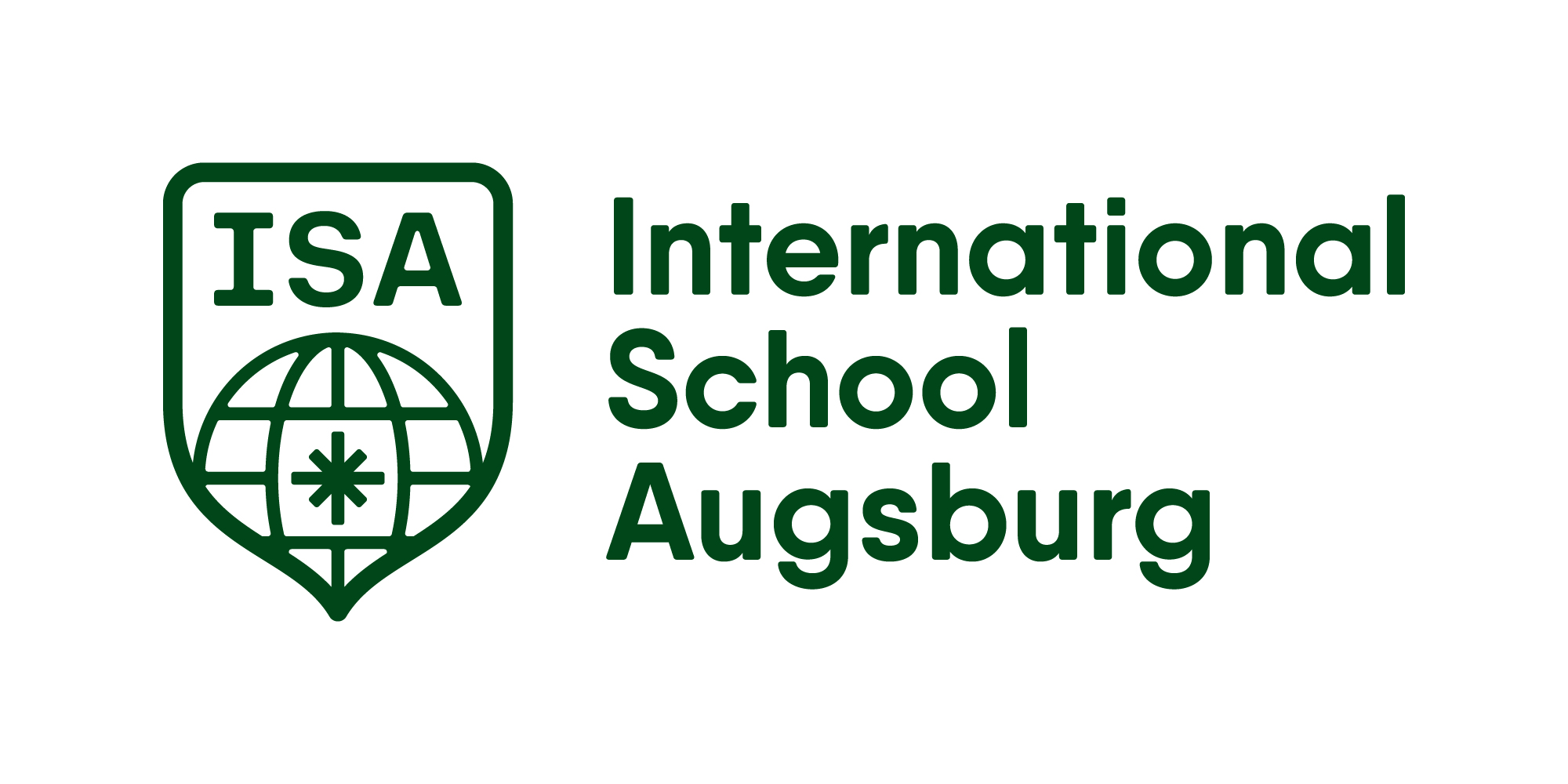
- Logo ISA

Location
- Gersthofen near Augsburg, Bavaria; Germany
- Coordinates: 48.41028°N 10.87111°E

Information
- Type: International School (“IB World School“), gemeinnützige AG (non-profit public organisation with limited liability)
- Established: 2005
- Board of Directors: Jessamine König [Education], Marcus Wagner [Business & Finance]
- Faculty: 60 (October 1st, 2017)
- Enrollment: 354 (February 28th, 2023)
- Region-ISO: DE-BY
- Website: http://www.isa-augsburg.com/

The International School Augsburg (ISA) is an English-speaking private all-day school in Gersthofen, a town near Augsburg. As an “IB World School” the ISA belongs to a worldwide network of international co-educative schools which offer the International Baccalaureate (IB Diploma) in English. Established in 2005, the ISA is the only international school within an area of around 60 kilometres around Augsburg. In school year 2011/2012, 320 students were taught by 50 teachers from 15 nations.

== History ==
The agglomeration Augsburg (Regio A³) and the metropolitan area of Munich are two of the largest business locations in Bavaria with a large number of international companies having their seats there. For local companies an international school may be an important site factor in the competition for foreign specialists and executives. Therefore, the International School Augsburg was established with the support of the IHK Schwaben (International Chamber of Commerce in Swabia) and opened in 2005 for its first school year. The location of choice was Gersthofen, situated 15 minutes from downtown Augsburg, 30 minutes from Munich and having access to nearby public transport as well as motorway.

As Munich and the price of its housing grew, many families made the decision to move down to Augsburg and therefore the need for an international school was felt more than ever. For these reasons in 2018, ISA started considering the expansion of their school to newer school premises. In order to obtain funding, in 2021 the school went public on the stock market.

In 2005, 65 children started their first school year in preschool (Early Learning Centre), Lower School (grade 1 to 5) and the first year of Middle School (grade 6). In 2010, the first class took their International General Certificate of Secondary Education exams (IGCSE) and in the following school year 2010/11 the High School was set up. In school year 2017/18, 342 students from more than 26 nations were enrolled in the ISA such as French, Russian, American, and many more. In 2023, the 12th graduating class took their International Baccalaureate exams (IB Diploma).

== Campus: the buildings ==
In 2005, the school moved into the first bricks-and mortar-built building in Ziegeleistraße. In 2008, when the school continued to grow, a gym and additional class rooms had to be built. In the year 2009 the new building, which is heated and supplied with power by a gas-fired cogeneration power plant, could be opened to the students. In 2012, the campus was enlarged by a third building. ISA have a playing field, a gym, a school-owned woodland, a school canteen, music rooms, a computer lab, and a science room as well as school buses.

ISA is currently working on plans of a new campus that the school is planned to permanently and entirely relocate to. The company has negotiated with the city of Gersthofen for a plot of land on which the Paul-Klee-Gymnasium will have formerly been located. The plot of land is planned to be made available to ISA at some point in 2024.

== Curriculum and projects ==
=== Curriculum ===
The curriculum of the ISA is based on the guidelines of the International Baccalaureate Organisation IBO and is developed in close collaboration with other international schools and the Bavarian Ministry of Education. It offers, especially to German children, a foundation for their future education. The school offers an Early Learning Centre (ELC) (3 – 5 years of age), a Lower School (grade 1 to grade 5), as well as a Middle School (grade 6 to grade 8), and a High School (grade 9 to grade 12). In the 10th grade, the students take their IGCSE (International General Certificate of Secondary Education) exams, in grade 12 students sit for International Baccalaureate Diploma exams. If certain criteria are met, both certificates are recognized, also in Bavaria, through the “Zeugnisanerkennungsstelle“ as the German “Mittlere Reife“ or “Allgemeine Hochschulreife”, respectively. The language of instruction is English, though German is frequently spoken by the large number of German students that attend. Where possible, in addition to German, Spanish is also taught. By EAL (English as additional language) classes, the English level of children with a different linguistic background shall be converged in different steps to the level of their grade. German is taught throughout all grades, at both a native and foreign language.

In the ninth grade, ISA teaches physics, biology, chemistry, English, Spanish, mathematics, geography, history, computer science, sports, learning skills, wellbeing and German. They also provide math, biology and geography support to students struggling. Spanish is not studied by struggling students, they spend the time doing work for other subjects. In 10th grade, students do their IGCSE exams in May and June, and take English, Spanish, mathematics, geography, sports, German, and essay writing. Students pick physics or biology, chemistry or history, and lastly computer science, art, and publications to do in 10th grade. In the 11th grade, students can leave campus for their free periods and have six subjects, at least three of which or higher level. Physics/biology, Spanish/chemistry/art, English, mathematics, geography/business and German. In the 12th grade, students take the IB examinations.

=== Projects ===
Special projects which are not laid down in the curriculum are the non-profit CAS (Creativity, Action, Service) Project, in which students from middle and partly high school must participate in. ISA also has a student council, with class one representative for each cla to undertake school-rss. Students of teachers are often the representatives. The association “Friends of ISA” was founded in 2005. It helps the school to purchase teaching material andelated projects, e.g. field trips. ISA publishes an annual yearbook.

== Cooperations, associations, public relations ==
In 2005, the “Student Council“was established. The association “Friends of ISA” was founded in 2005. It helps the school to purchase additional quality teaching material and to undertake school-related projects, like e.g. trips which support the students’ education. The ISA publishes a yearbook (annually) and a weekly newsletter.

== Accreditations and memberships ==
- 2021: Top 100 Innovator (German SME sector)
- 2020: Eco School
- 2017: IB-PYP-Reauthorisation
- 2016: Member of the consortium of International Schools in Bavaria (AISB)
- 2012: CIS / NEASC accreditation
- 2010: Authorization to offer the diploma programme of the International Baccalaureate Organization (IB World School)
- 2009: IB PYP Authorization (IB World School)
- 2008: Member of the Council of International Schools (CIS), recognised Cambridge Examinations Centre (IGCSE)
- 2005: Member of the Association of German International Schools (AGIS)
- 2005: Authorization as state-approved alternative school (“Ersatzschule”) in grade 1 to 9, Arbeitsgemeinschaft Internationaler Schulen in Deutschland e.V. (AGIS), New England Association of Schools and Colleges (NEASC).
