= Isa, Amur Oblast =

Isa Иса
- Settlement
- Location within Amur Oblast Location within Russia
- Coordinates: 51°45′N 131°01′E
- Country: Russia
- Region: Amur Oblast
- District: Selemdzhinsky District
- Time zone: UTC+9:00

Isa (Russian: Иса) is a rural locality (a settlement) in Isinsky Selsoviet of Selemdzhinsky District, Amur Oblast, Russia. The population was 433 as of 2018. There are 11 streets.

== Geography ==
Isa is located 294 km southwest of Ekimchan (the district's administrative centre) by road.
