= Student Union of Latvia =

LSA
- Student Union of Latvia
- Latvijas Studentu apvienība
- Founded: 10 December 1994
- Headquarters: Mārstaļu iela 2/4, LV-1010, Latvia
- Location: Latvia
- Website: www.lsa.lv

The aim of the Student Union of Latvia (LSA, Latvian: Latvijas Studentu apvienība) is to represent Latvia's students, and to work for the observance of their rights and interests at a national and international level.

== Structure ==
The principal decision–making body of the LSA is the Congress that develops conceptual action plans, approves finances as well as elects the president and vice-president. The Congress gathers once a year and representatives are nominated by student unions.

The LSA Council comes together regularly once per two months and decides about LSA statements and positions, about the development of the organisation as well as defining the responsibilities of the members of the Board. It elects the Board. Representatives are nominated by student unions.

LSA’s president, vice-president and officers are responsible for the daily work of organising and executing the policies laid down by the Congress and realizing the statements of the Council. The president administers the work of the officers. The current president is Alens Aleksandrs Čerņa.

== Tasks ==
- To contribute to the development and advancement of education and the cooperation of local unions of students of higher education institutions
- To collaborate with organisations related with students and youth issues
- To turn to enterprises, state officials, authorities, state and municipality institutions with requests, proposals and declarations in the name of the students in Latvia
- To improve the quality of education and academic traditions, democracy and individual initiative, the self-esteem of students and development of personality, healthy life-style and mental health, civil integration of youth and participation in society
- To nominate student representatives towards different authorities; etc.

== Membership ==
Since 1998, LSA is a full member of European Students' Union, an umbrella organisation of national European student unions. LSA is also a member of NOM (Nordic Organisational meeting) and BOM (Baltic organisational meeting), which both are Nordic and Baltic student unions` cooperation networks to share experiences and support.

== Members ==
The members of LSA come from student unions of all Latvia higher education institutions.

== Accomplishments ==
Since 1994 LSA has submitted a number of proposals, regulations, amendments of law, as well as organised educational and informational seminars and other events. Among the main recent events the following can be mentioned:

1. Elaboration of Codex of Administrative breach – inclusion of an obligatory clause about study contract of HEI and responsibilities of HEI (February, 2005).
2. Research project about necessity of implementing intercity transport discounts instead of cash benefit for students, living far from HEIs (February, 2005).
3. LSA has worked in preparation of the amendments to the Law on Higher Education Establishments. The main proposal concerns defining LSA as the student representing body in the law. The law will soon be discussed in the Parliament (Since March, 2005).
4. Informational campaign among secondary school students about LSA, accreditation of HEIs, loans, grants and student’s rights (March, 2005).
5. ESIB Commodification Committee seminar (May, 2005).
6. Study about science and research in Latvia: current situation of student involvement in PhD studies and scientific research work (May, 2005).
7. Informational campaign for 1st year students – consulting on the telephone line about accreditation of study programs, HEIs, loans etc. before the study year begins (July – August, 2005).
8. Forum for Latvian student leaders about informal learning and labour market (August, 2005).
9. Seminar for student representatives in senates of universities on HE trends in Europe (October, 2005).

== Partnerships ==
One LSA representative each is a member of the Accreditation Commission of the Ministry of Education and Science, of the Council of Higher Education, and of the Convention of Councillors of the State Youth Initiative Centre. The organization cooperates with the Rectors’ Council, the National Youth Council of Latvia, and the National Pupil Council of Latvia. It is a member of the Baltic Organisation Meeting (BOM) of Baltic national unions of students.

== Projects ==
Every year LSA organises both thematic and educational seminars for the activists of local student unions:

- Seminar cycle “Who Cares About Students?” for education of activists of local student unions
- Seminar Cycle “Rights for Every Student” about rights of students and local student unions
- Student Year Prize Ceremony
- Seminars for regional and private higher education institutions
- Latvian Student Leaders’ Forum
- Seminar for students - senators (Members of Senates) of Latvian higher education institutions
