= Liver stage antigens =

Liver stage antigens (LSA) are a set of peptides from Plasmodium falciparum that are recognized by the body's immune system.

The two most studied ones are:

- LSA-1
- LSA-3
