= Issa (inhabited locality) =

Issa (Russian: Исса) is the name of several inhabited localities in Russia.

Urban localities

- Issa, Penza Oblast, a work settlement in Issinsky District of Penza Oblast

Rural localities

- Issa, Pskov Oblast, a village in Pushkinogorsky District of Pskov Oblast
