= ISSE =

Isse or ISSE may refer to:

== Places ==
- Isse, village and commune in north-eastern France
- Issé, village and commune in north-western France

== Computing ==
- Information Systems Security Engineering
- Internet Streaming SIMD Extensions, an SIMD instruction set extension to the x86 architecture by Intel introduced in 1999
- Integer Streaming SIMD Extensions, an informal name for MMX extensions associated with 3DNow! extensions

== Other uses ==
- Issé (opera), by André Cardinal Destouches
- International Secondary School Eindhoven, a school in the Netherlands
- International Students for Social Equality
- Hirsi Magan Isse (1935–2008), scholar and a leading figure of the Somali Revolution
