= Pan American Stadium =

Pan American Stadium is the name given to some venues built for the Pan American Games and may refer to the following:

- Pan American Stadium (New Orleans), New Orleans
- Pan American Stadium (Winnipeg), Winnipeg, Canada
- Pan Am and Parapan Am Athletics Stadium, Toronto, Canada
- Pan American Stadium (Cuba), Cuba
- Estadio Panamericano, San Cristóbal, San Cristóbal, Dominican Republic
- Estadio Panamericano de Béisbol, Zapopan, Mexico

== See also ==
- Pan Am and Parapan Am Aquatics Centre and Field House, Toronto, Canada
- Pan Am Ball Park, Toronto, Canada
- Pan Am Field Hockey Centre, Toronto, Canada
- Pan Am Pool, Winnipeg, Canada
- Pan American Baseball Stadium, Lagos de Moreno, Mexico
- Estadio Panamericano de Hockey, Guadalajara, Mexico
- Estadio Panamericano de Softbol, Guadalajara, Mexico
