= International School of Athens =

Coordinates: 38°4′35.5″N 23°49′19.18″E

- The only IB continuum school in Athens, taught in English
- Kifissia; Greece

Information
- Type: Independent
- Established: 1972
- Staff: 150
- Age range: 2.5–18
- Colors: Green, Yellow, Red and Blue
- Newspaper: ISA NEA
- Communities served: 60+ nationalities
- Website: https://www.isa.edu.gr/

The International School of Athens (ISA) is an independent and an International Baccalaureate (IB) School. ISA, formerly TASIS, a privately held school located in Kifissia, a suburb of Athens, Greece.

== Education ==
ISA teaches students from Nursery to 18. The main campus develops the academic careers of students from Kindergarten – Grade 12 offering the IB Diploma and College Preparatory programs to its high school students.

== Language development ==
Weekday programs focus on college and university-bound development, while weekend school focuses on English language development. In addition to English, ISA provides French, Spanish, German and Arabic as well as Mandarin Chinese language classes to adult learners.
