= Issa (Lesbos) =

Ancient Greek town

Coordinates: 39°12′26″N 26°07′53″E

Issa (Ancient Greek: Ἴσσα) was a town of ancient Lesbos.

The site of Issa is tentatively located near modern Xerokastrine.
