= Internal Security Act =

Internal Security Act may refer to:

- Internal Security Act 1960, former Malaysian law
  - Internal Security Act (Singapore), the same law extended to Singapore
- McCarran Internal Security Act, a United States federal law
- Suppression of Communism Act, 1950, a South African law, renamed the "Internal Security Act" in 1976
- Internal Security Act, 1982, a South African law
