= Panic and Agoraphobia Scale =

Scale for measuring severity of agoraphobia

- Purpose: Measures severity of agoraphobia

The Panic and Agoraphobia Scale (PAS) is a rating scale developed for measuring severity of agoraphobia with or without panic attacks.

== Background ==
The Panic and Agoraphobia Scale (PAS) is primarily used for monitoring the efficacy of both medication and psychotherapy treatments of agoraphobia, as well as a screening tool for the disorder. It is available in both self-rated and clinician-rated versions and the scale structure is compatible with DSM-IV and ICD-10 classifications.

=== Translations ===
In addition to the English version, translations are available in many languages, including French, German, Greek, Hebrew, Italian, Yiddish, Chinese, Thai, and others.

== Scoring ==
The total of the score of scale indicates the severity of the disorder. The PAS contains 13 questions (items) based on a five-point Likert scale (0 to 4). Two or three items contribute each of five subscales, which cover the spectrum of agoraphobia symptom clusters:

1. panic attacks
2. agoraphobic avoidance
3. anticipatory anxiety
4. disability
5. worries about health

== Efficacy ==
The Panic and Agoraphobia Scale has been shown to be an effective instrument for measuring the severity of agoraphobia and panic attacks, as well as monitoring treatment results.

== See also ==
- Panic Disorder Severity Scale
- List of diagnostic classification and rating scales used in psychiatry
