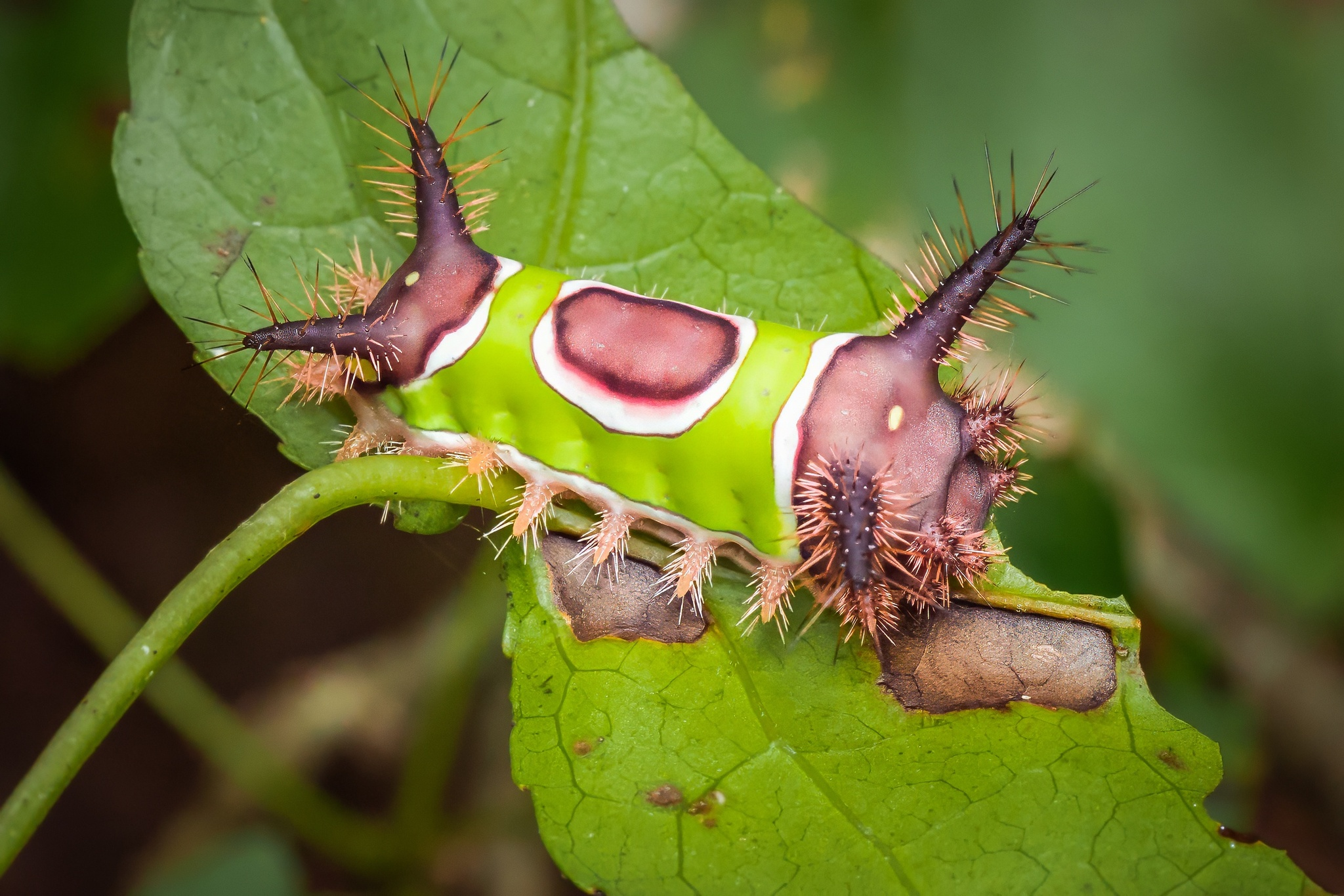

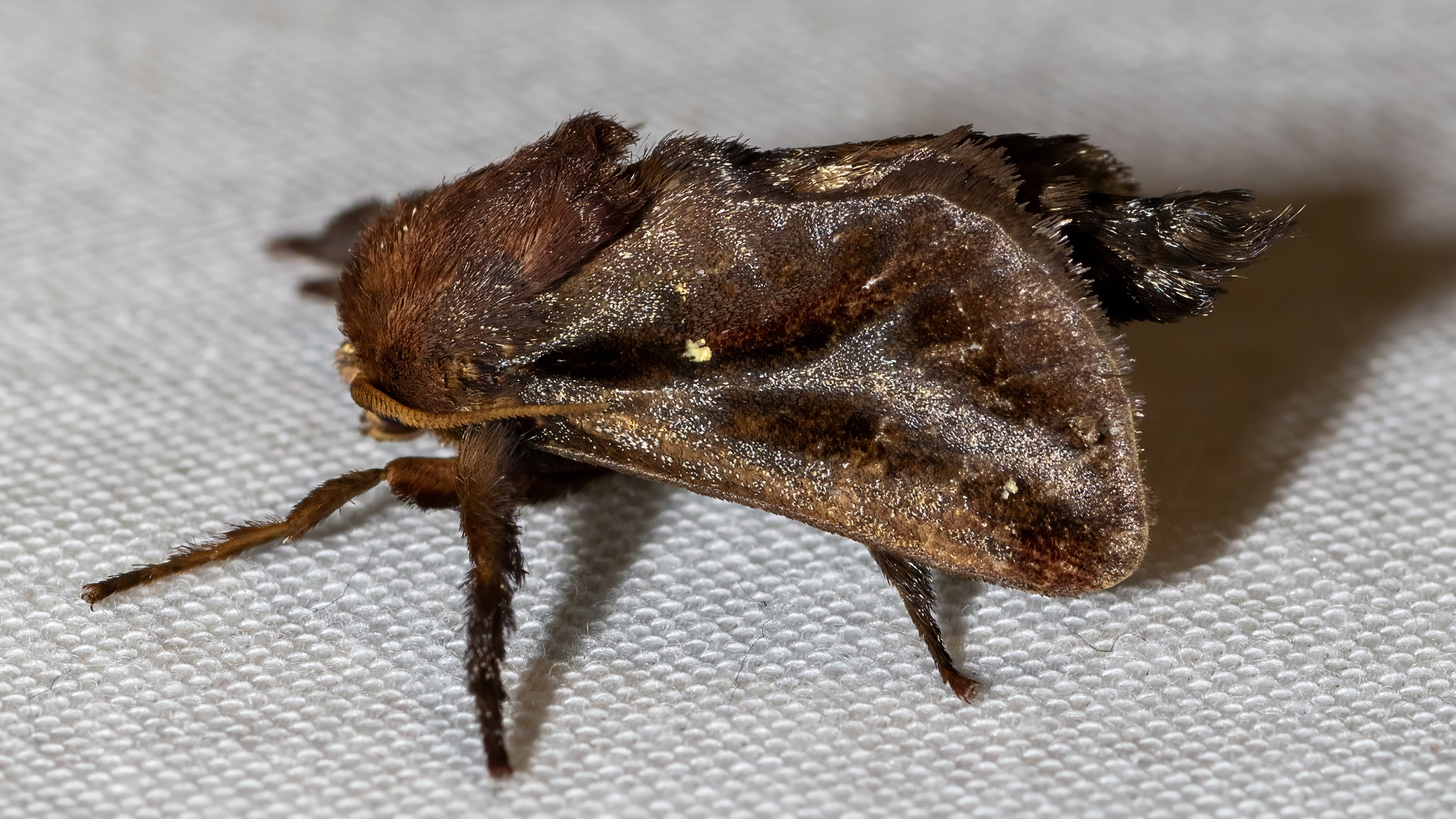

Scientific classification
- Kingdom: Animalia
- Phylum: Arthropoda
- Clade: Pancrustacea
- Class: Insecta
- Order: Lepidoptera
- Family: Limacodidae
- Genus: Acharia
- Species: A. stimulea

Binomial name
- Acharia stimulea (Clemens, 1860)

Synonyms
- Empretia stimulea Clemens, 1860; Limacodes ephippiatus Harris, 1869; Sibine ephippiatus Kirby, 1892; Sabine stimulus

= Saddleback caterpillar =

Larva of an eastern North American moth

The saddleback caterpillar (Acharia stimulea, formerly Sibine stimulea) is the larva of a species of moth native to eastern North America. It is also found in Mexico and Central America. The species belongs to the family of slug caterpillars, Limacodidae.

The larva (caterpillar) is primarily green with brown at both ends and a prominent white-ringed brown dot in the center which resembles a saddle. It has a pair of fleshy horns at both ends. These and most of the rest of the body bear urticating hairs that secrete an irritating venom. Contact with the hairs causes a painful, swollen rash and sometimes nausea in humans. In some cases, more severe reactions to the venom can occur, including a systemic condition called erucism or acute urticaria, for which severe symptoms may include migraines, gastrointestinal symptoms, asthma complications, anaphylactic shock, rupturing of erythrocytes, and hemorrhaging. The hairs should be removed from the skin immediately to prevent more venom spread. The cocoon may also have irritating hairs, and hairs from the larva can fall on surrounding objects.

The larvae feed on plants. In Florida and Alabama in the United States, it feeds on palms such as the Manila palm (Adonidia merrillii).

== Description ==
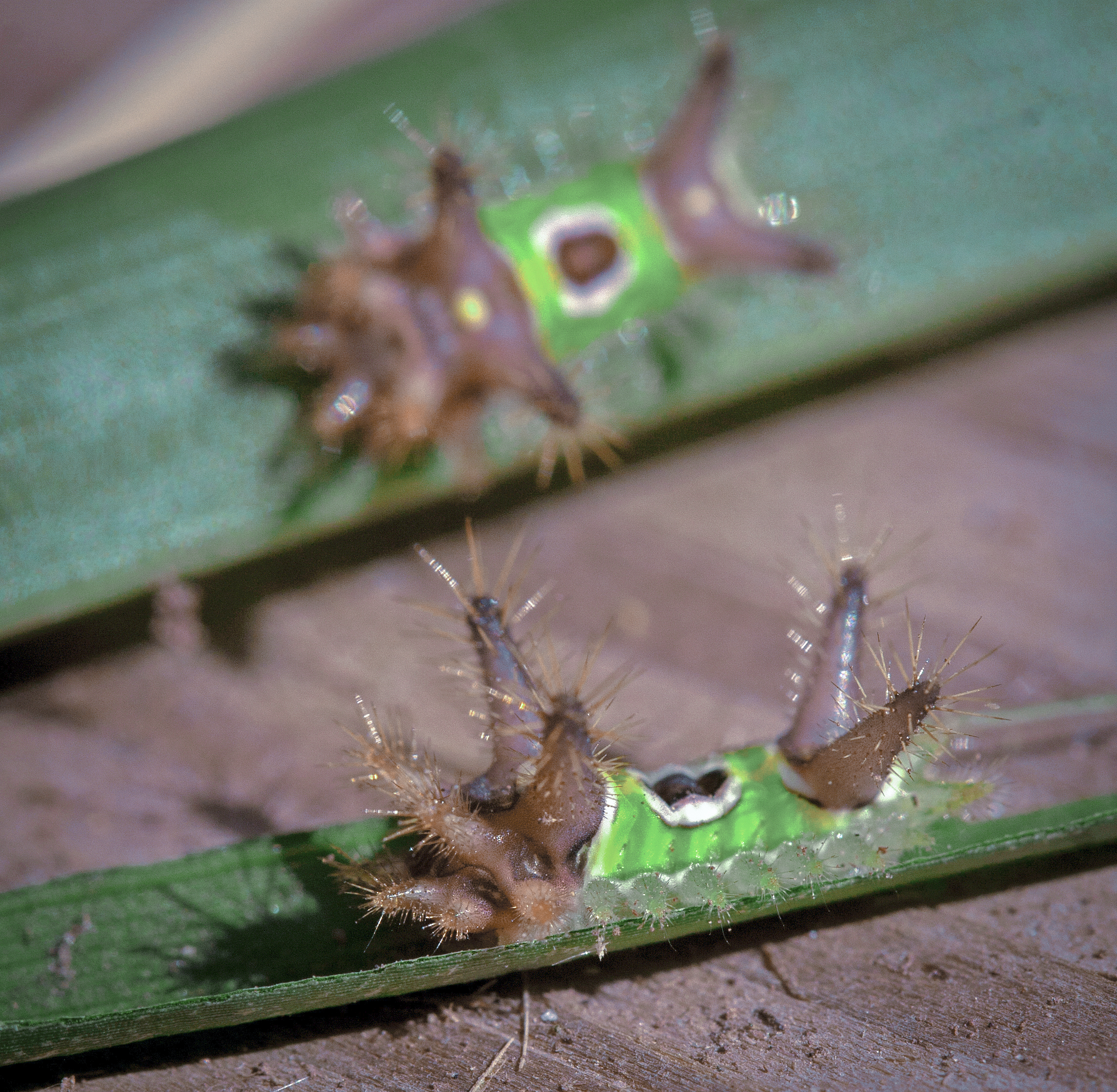
Acharia stimulea caterpillars lateral and anterior view

Acharia stimulea (formally known as Sibine stimulea) is a moth of the family Limacodidae that is most widely known and recognizable for its larval phase. During the mid and late instar (a phase between two periods of molting in the development), Acharia stimulea exhibits its characteristic lime-green coloring along the top of the body that contains its most identifiable feature, a dark marking at the center that is inclosed in a white and black that resembles a saddle. The green of the body contrasts against its dark anterior (head) and posterior (rear) which, along with the skirt of the body, contain tubercles with hollow spines that, when broken, release an irritating toxin into predators. Like others in the family Limacodidae, they rely on their slug-like anatomy to move. Similar to a slug, Acharia stimulea uses suckers and mucus to help them roll and adhere to surfaces. After pupation, the adult Acharia stimulea loses all of its vibrant coloring, and develops velvety dark brown anterior wings and cream posterior wings.

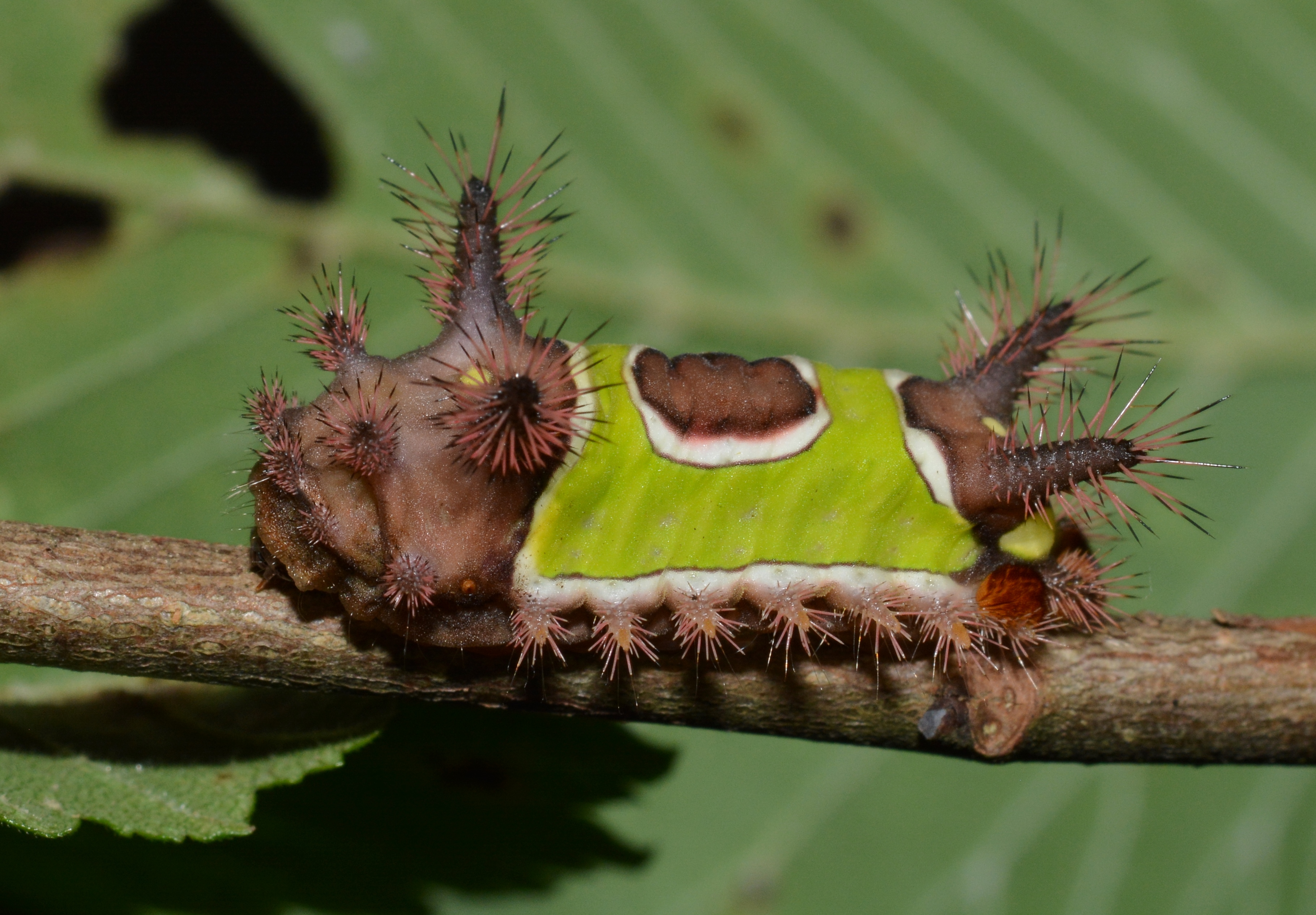
Saddleback caterpillar (larvae form of Acharia stimulea)

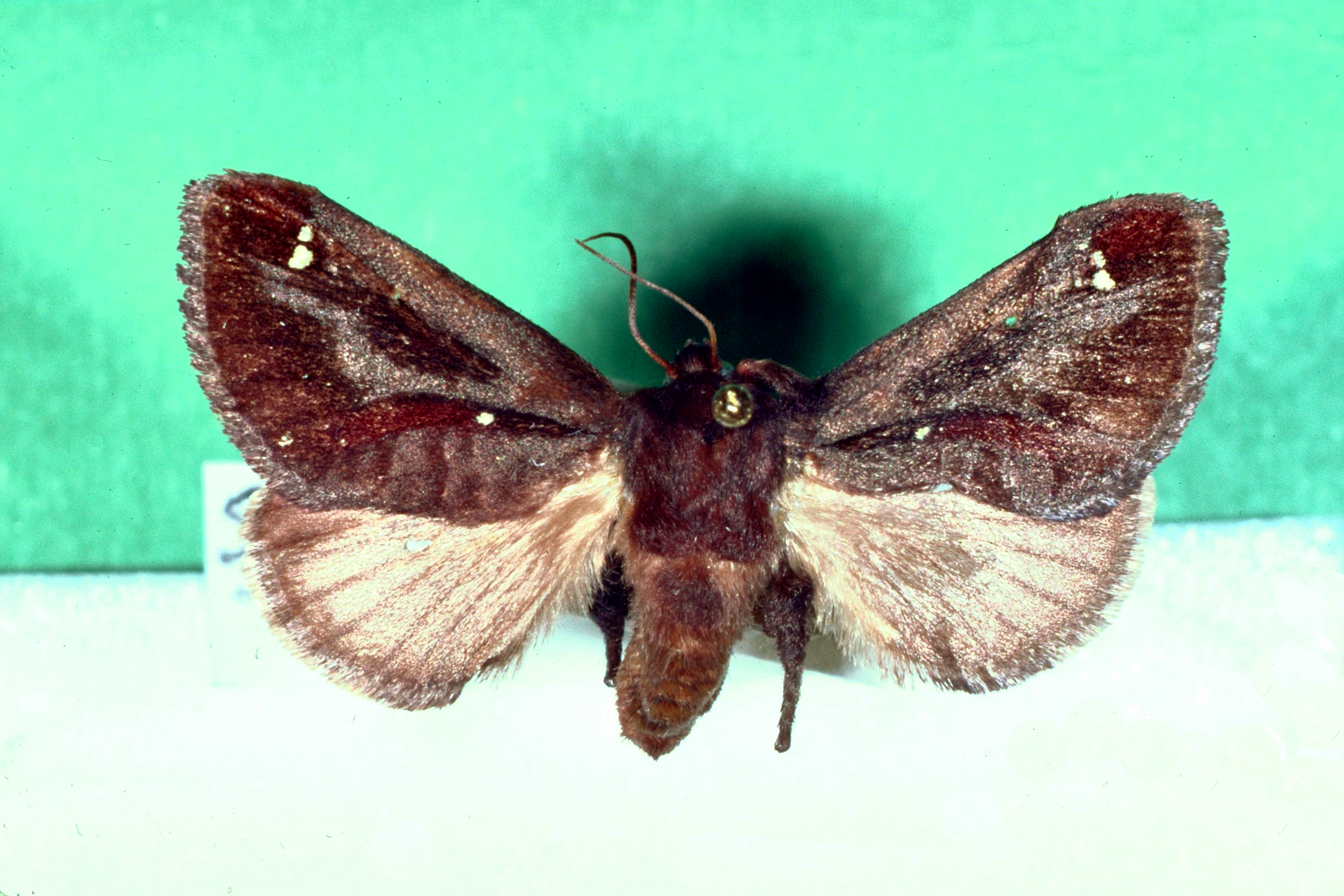
Adult form of Acharia stimulea

== Distribution and habitat ==
Acharia stimulea are native to North America and are most known for living in warmer climates like Yucatan, Mexico, but they can also survive the slightly cooler temperatures of the eastern United States. Adult moths fly during warm months, which can be year round in the south or between July and August in the U.S.

Acharia stimulea are polyphagous and do not rely on a single plant species for survival, though they tend to favor palms. Below is a list of known host plants that the Acharia stimulea female moths are known to lay their egg on and where they live during their larvae phase:

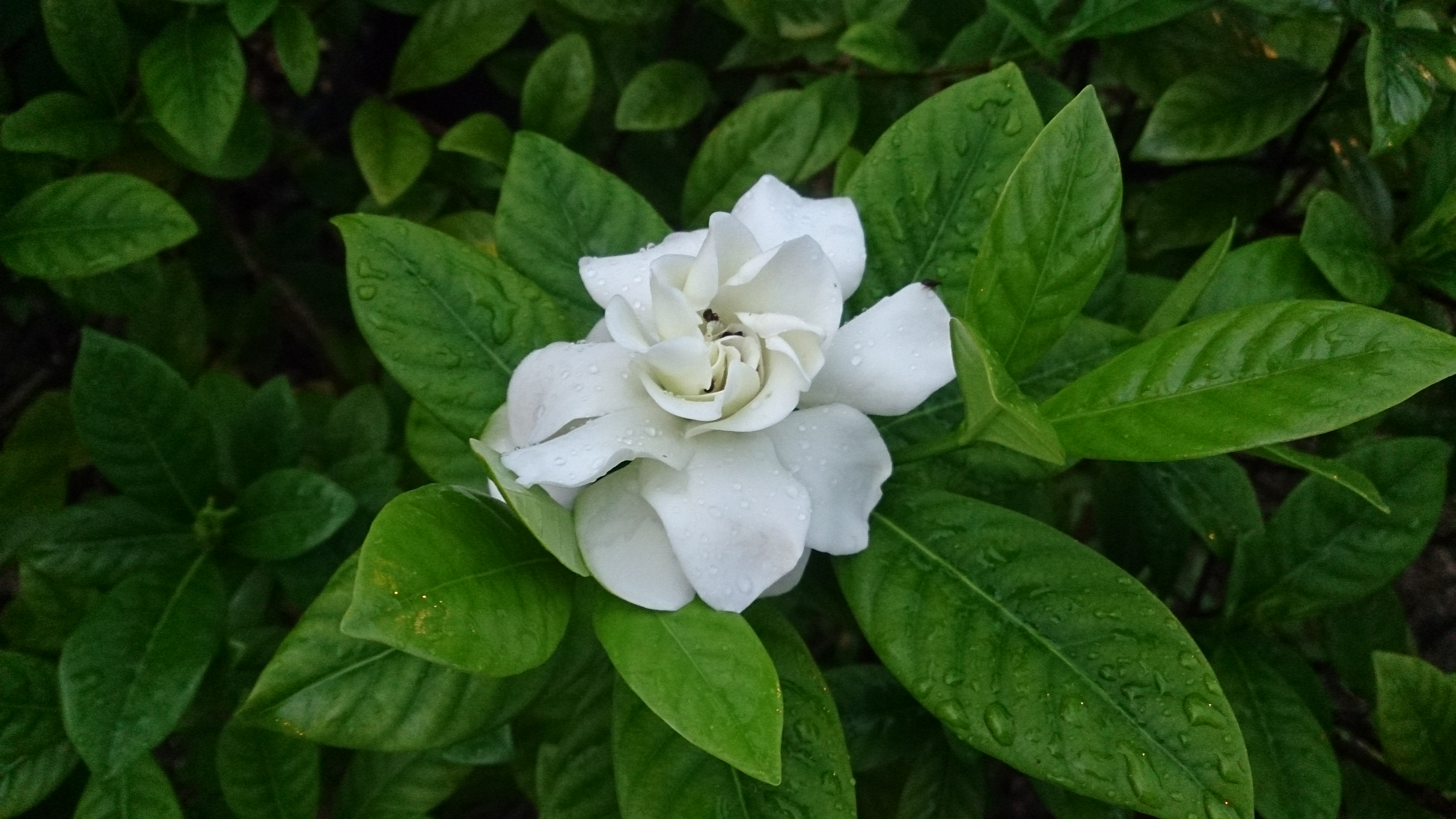
Gardenia

Host Plants:
Rosaceae	basswood	chestnut	dogwood	elm
oak	maple	plum	Viburnum	holly
Brazilian Peppertree	flamingo flower	pathos vine	Palms	Asparagaceae
Helianthus	Caribbean trumpet tree	hackberry	Indian shot	sago 'palm'
Vaccinium	Codiaeum	Wisteria	Hydrangea	Gladiolus
pecan	spicebush	Leea coccinea	crape myrtle	Barbados cherry
Malvaceae	West Indies mahogany	rubber fig	Eucalyptus	Orchidaceae
sweet corn	Podocarpus	coral vine	seagrape	macadamia nut
Gardenia	mountain coffee	jungle geranium	Citrus aurantium	grapevine
canistel	false buckthorn	great white bird of paradise	lychee	kale

== Life cycle ==
Stages of metamorphosis:

=== Eggs ===
The mother Acharia stimulea will lay her eggs three days after mating on the underside of a host plant's leaf, laying clusters of 30–50 eggs at a single time with an average of 300 in total. Each egg is around 1.5–2.0 mm long and 1 mm wide. Similar to other eggs of the family Limacodidae, Acharia stimulea eggs are flat and are a translucent lime green color when first laid by the mother. As they get closer to hatching, the eggs become a translucent yellow and shriveled. Eclosion (the emergence of larvae from eggs) can take up to 10 days and the newly emerged larvae will feed on the underside of a leaf's epidermis until their first molt.

=== Larvae ===
Throughout its life as a larva, the saddleback caterpillar will go through a series of growths and molts. During the period between each molt, the larva is regarded as an instar to indicate its progression into adulthood.

==== First instar ====
Caterpillar larvae vary in size and are capable of being between 1.5–2.0 mm in length. At this stage, a hatchling lacks its characteristic coloring and instead tends to be a translucent lime green with green or black tentacles and green protuberances along the skirt which lack the long spiny thorns that are seen in older larvae. While it also lacks the recognizable saddled back, there may be markings on the body that indicate where the saddle will be as the top of some hatchlings tend to have a white or a slightly darker green marking on its top center.

==== Middle instar ====
Occurs during the second to fourth molt and is the period in time where the larva begins to gain its characteristic markings. Here, the top of the body gains a more opaque green that differentiates the top of the body from the bottom and contains a black dot, commonly called a "saddle", at the center that is held within a white oval shape that is surrounded by a black outlining. At this stage, the tentacles also gain their coloring. The tentacles usually become darker with age, starting as green when hatched and then becoming orange around the middle instar. Some Acharia stimulea will also develop a facial marking with two cream or light-green markings that mimic large eyes at the posterior end of the body. The protuberances along the bottom sides of the larvae also become orange at this stage. Thorns on the tentacles and the protuberances along the side of the body also begin to elongate and obtain their stinging nature, with those on the tentacles being longer in length. At this stage, larvae will also begin to eat plant tissue and grow to be about 5–8 mm in size.

==== Late instar ====
Acharia stimulea is most known for its late instar stage where it is easily identifiable through its unique marking that has become more vibrant. As the anterior and posterior range from being a vibrant orange, brown, or dark purple the top of the body has turned into a more vibrant green. The caterpillars' green body with its characteristic “saddle” has also become well defined with its color having developed into a dark-orange or brown color with each of its molts. At this stage, the thorns along the tentacles and tuburances have also become well developed and elongated. About four to five months after hatching, the caterpillar will have reached its final instar and will begin to feed on both sides of the leaf and leaf tissue to ready itself for pupating. Before spinning its cocoon, an individual larva can reach measurements close to 20 mm long and 7 mm wide.

=== Pupa ===
While pupating, the cocoon appears to be a hardened light brown spherical shape with black veining that is encompassed in silk webbing. This webbing is made up in part by caterpillars’ stinging thorns, which help attach and protect the caterpillar through its metamorphosis.

=== Adult ===
Acharia stimulea emerge in June and July with females tending to be larger in size than their male counterparts. Acharia moths are not dimorphic in color as both males and females have dark brown anterior wings, cream posterior wings, and a dark brown body. Like in other moths in the family Limacodidae, the wings and body appear to have a velvety fur-like texture. One of the main characteristics of Acharia stimulea at this stage is the presence of white dots that occur with about one or three at the apex and one at the inner middle of the anterior wings. Their wings can also reach a wingspan of 30 mm. At this stage, Acharia stimulea lack envenomation and live 10 days on average.

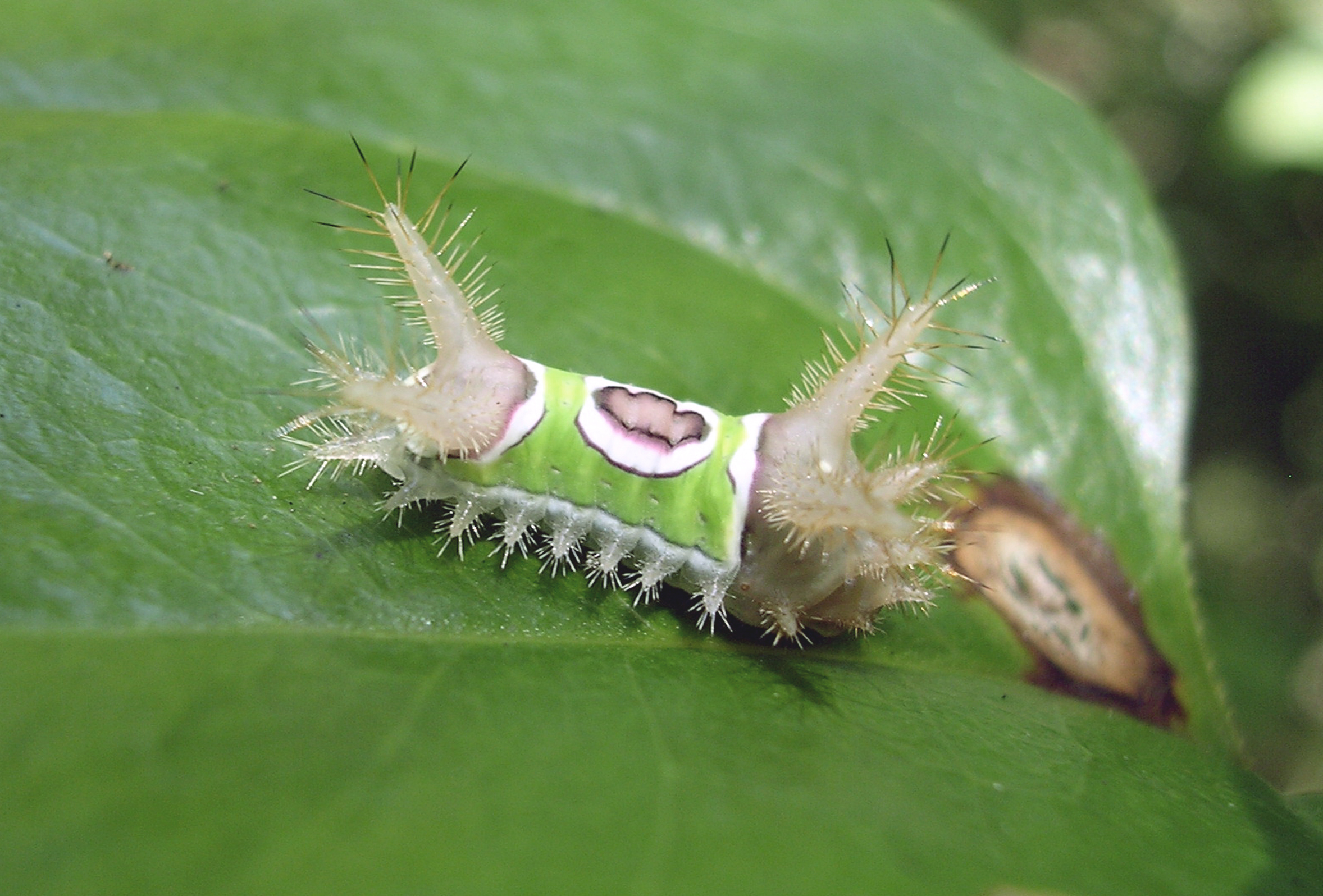
Mid instar

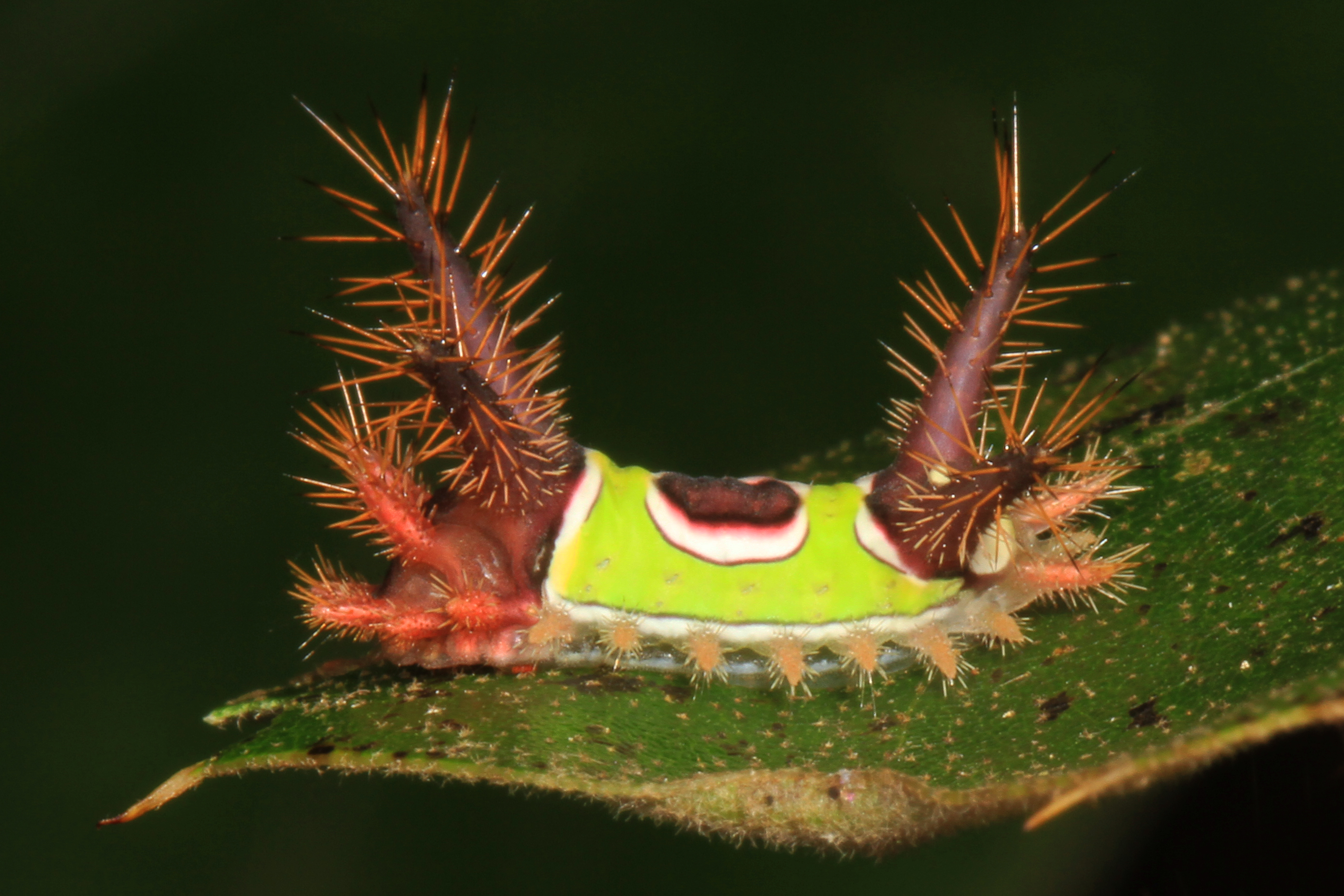
Late instar

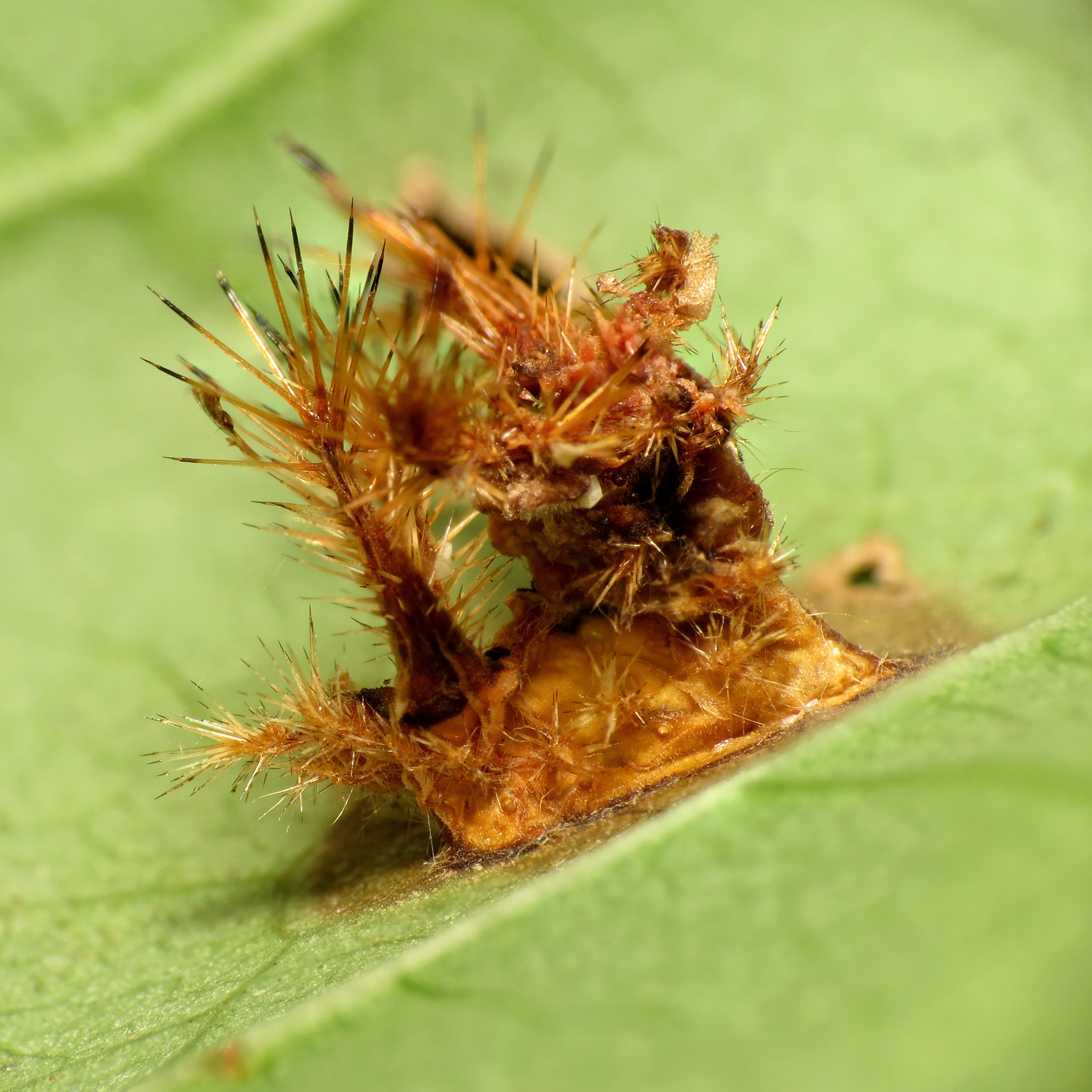
Saddleback caterpillar remains

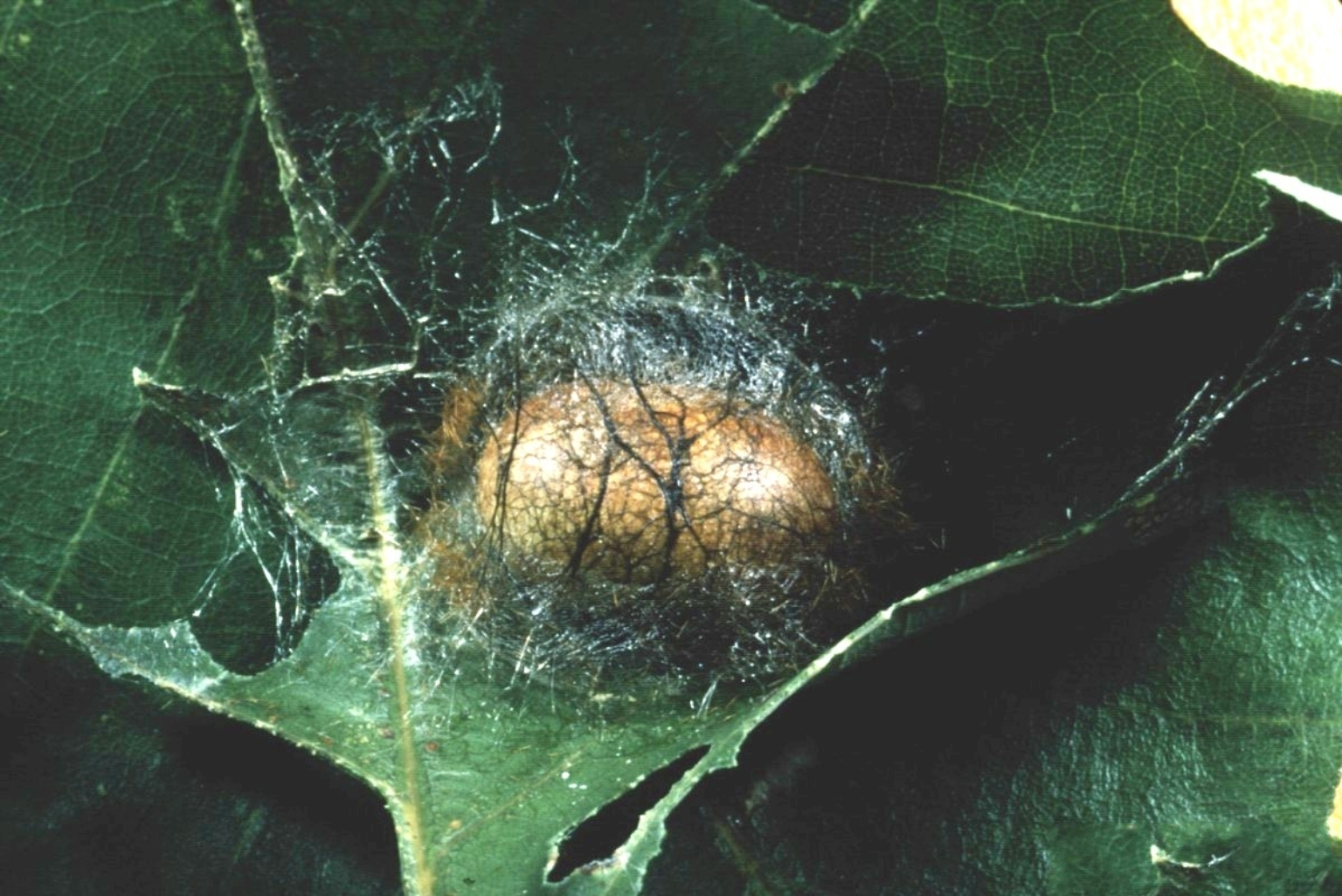
Pupa

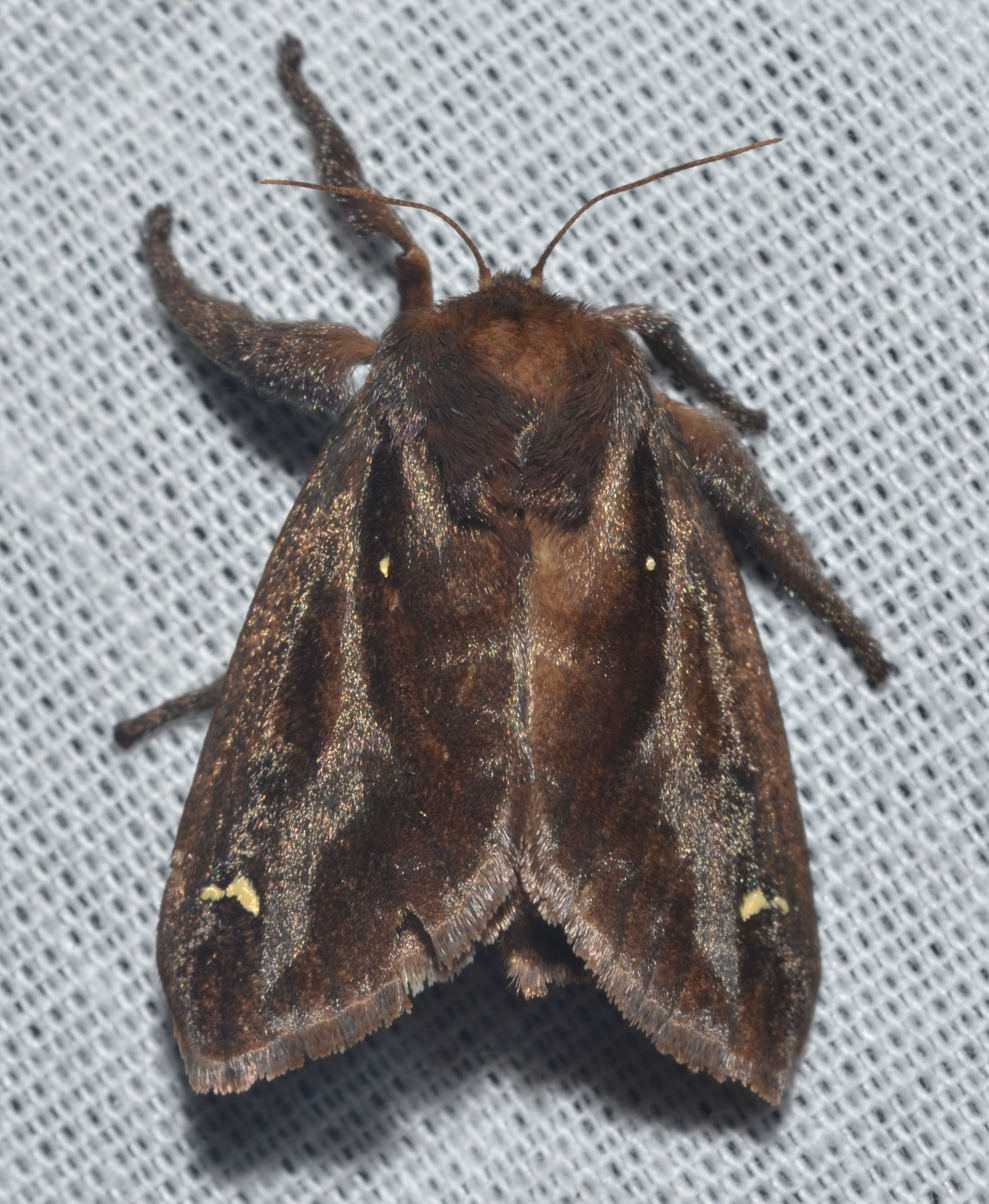
Adult Acharia stimulea

== Reproduction ==
Adult Acharia stimulea will mate as soon as two days after emerging from their cocoon and will copulate for up to 24 hours. In the wild, mating rituals occur during nights with warm temperatures, which can vary between February and July in the United States. After mating, the female will choose a host plant, and lay her eggs on the underside of the leaf where she will frequently visit until they have successfully hatched.

== Defense against predators ==
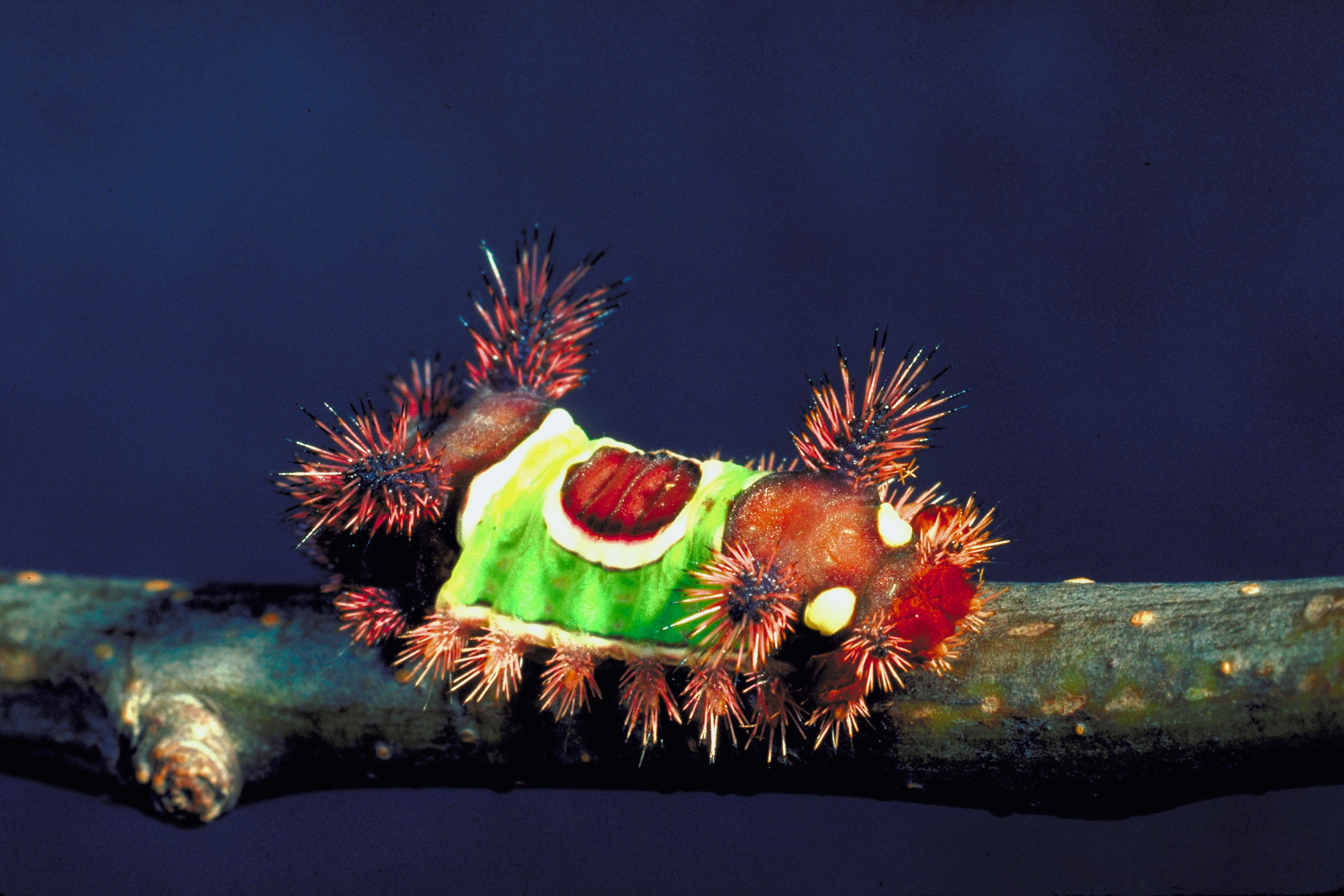
Saddleback caterpillar exhibiting aposematism and mimicry

Acharia stimulea has two distinct defense mechanisms, aposematism and mimicry.

=== Aposematism ===
Acharia stimulea exhibits aposematic coloring which is a distinct vibrant coloring that represents their toxicity. Along the anterior, posterior and skirt of the caterpillar are tubercles that contain threatening hollow spines. While these spines are threatening alone, they actually go a step further in acting as a defense mechanism, as they are connected to a gland that secretes venom that, when broken, is released into predators or unsuspecting gardeners. These spines are usually orange along the skirt of the caterpillar and orange or black along the tentacles present at both ends of the body. The larvae will use this defensively by curling outwards so that their spines are unavoidable to a predator. The spines are also used in the silk cocoon to further protect it during metamorphosis.

=== Mimicry ===
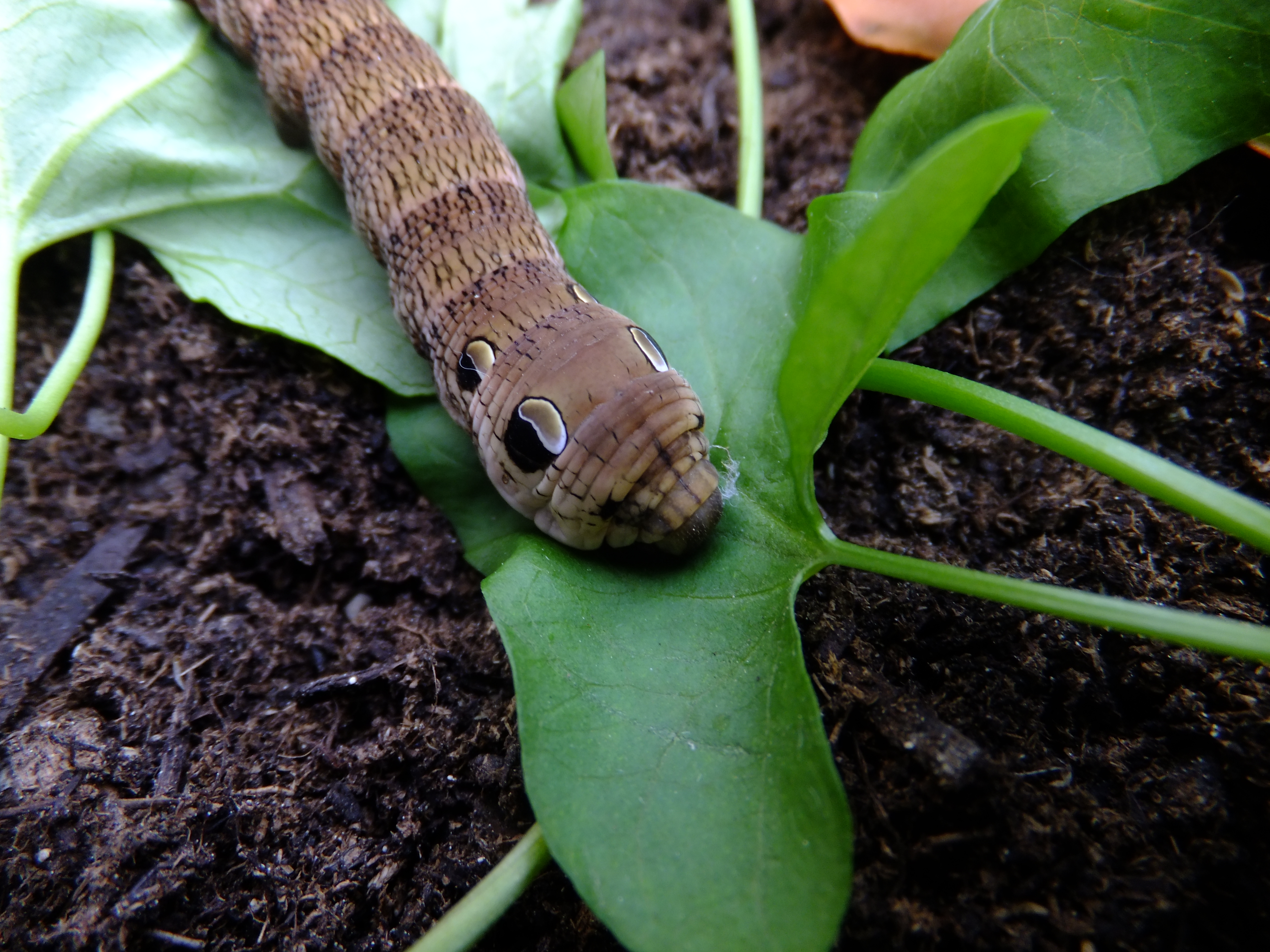
Elephant hawkmoth (Deilephila elpenor, Sphingidae)

Throughout the larvae stage, Acharia stimulea also exhibits a false face with two green or white dots that contrast against the dark coloring of the body that act as large eyes. While this marking resembles a face, it is actually located at the posterior of the saddleback caterpillar. This is an example of defensive mimicry, which can be seen in other moth species such as Deilephila elpenor (elephant hawk-moth), which exhibits snake-like features in order to deter predators. It is not uncommon for these facial features to be represented on the posterior, as it is believed to be used to misdirect predators and is often called automimicry or intraspecific mimicry.

== Dangers and treatments of stings ==
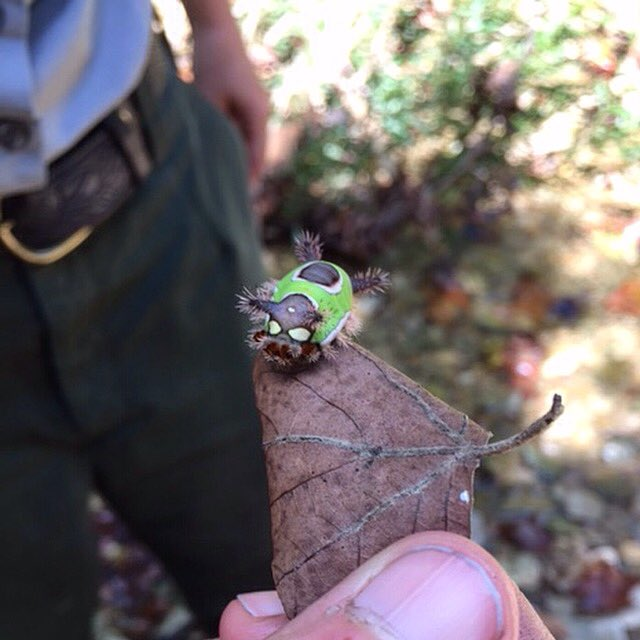
Late instar saddleback caterpillar

Acharia stimulea is known for having one of the strongest stings and, because the saddleback caterpillar is commonly found in ornamental plants, gardeners are most at risk of accidental exposure. The spines along the caterpillar, when broken, will release an irritating toxin into its victims that is known to cause acute urticaria in humans. These spines are fragile and can become airborne and embedded into surfaces, therefore immediate action is required for removal if infected to prevent prolonged harm. Spines can be removed by using adhesive tape over the infected area to pull out the spines, with a new piece of tape used for each treatment. Symptoms can be mild or severe and typically last from a few hours to a few days, depending on the sensitivity of those affected, and are relieved through prescribed medication on a case-by-case basis. Some of the symptoms include headaches, conjunctivitis, difficulty breathing, gastrointestinal symptoms, asthma complications, anaphylactic shock and hemorrhaging. Ice packs, corticosteroids, topical and oral antihistamines have been reported to help relieve pain.

== Parasitism ==
The saddleback caterpillar are known to become frequently infested by a braconid wasp. A female braconid wasp will inject eggs in a venom like manner into its chosen host caterpillar, which is known as ovipositing. The parasitic wasp eggs are able to survive by feeding on the inside of the saddleback caterpillar and emerge as larvae by creating holes in the body.

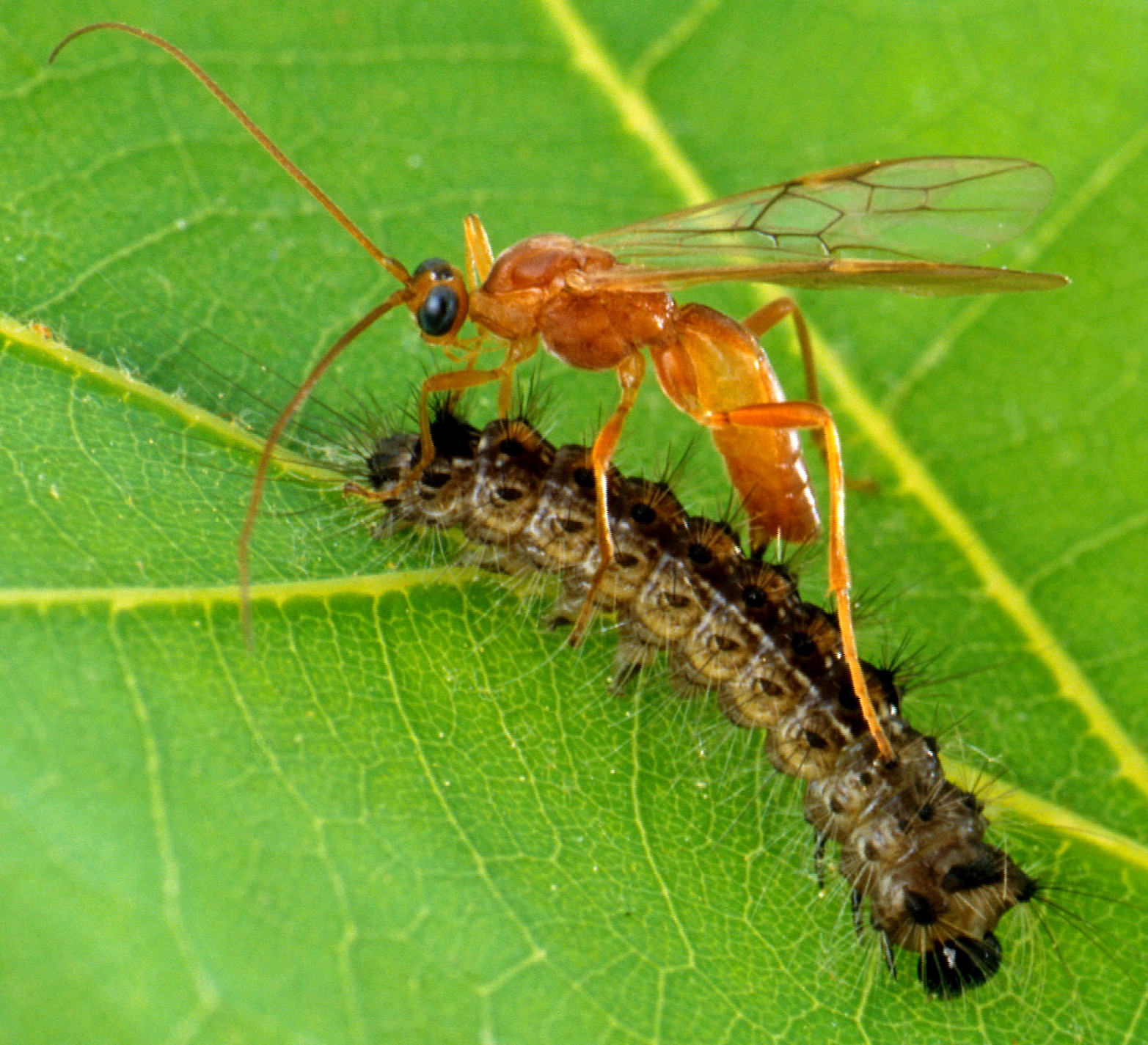
Example of ovipositing seen in the Aleiodes indiscretus wasp

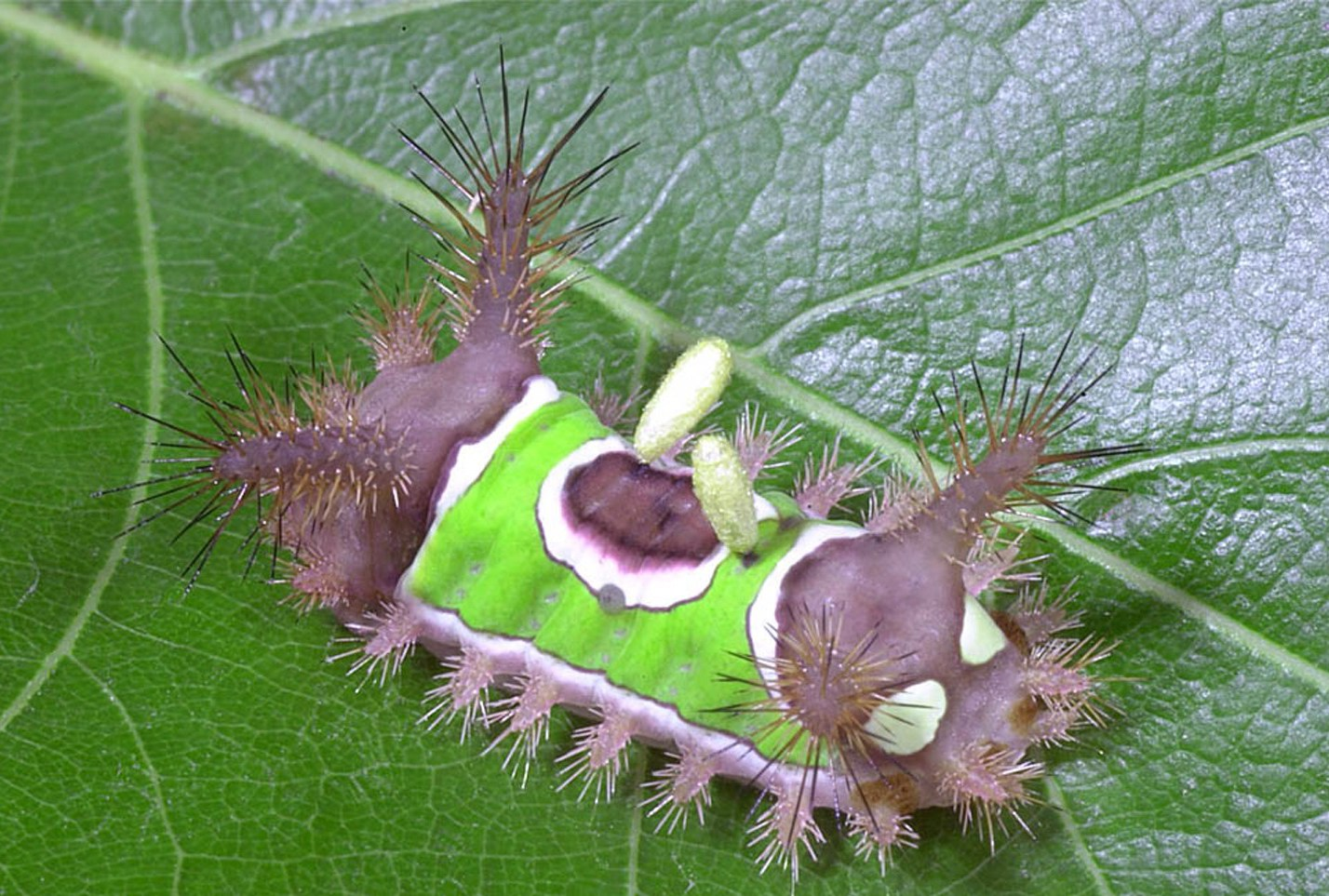
Parasitic braconid wasp larvae emerging from the saddleback caterpillar

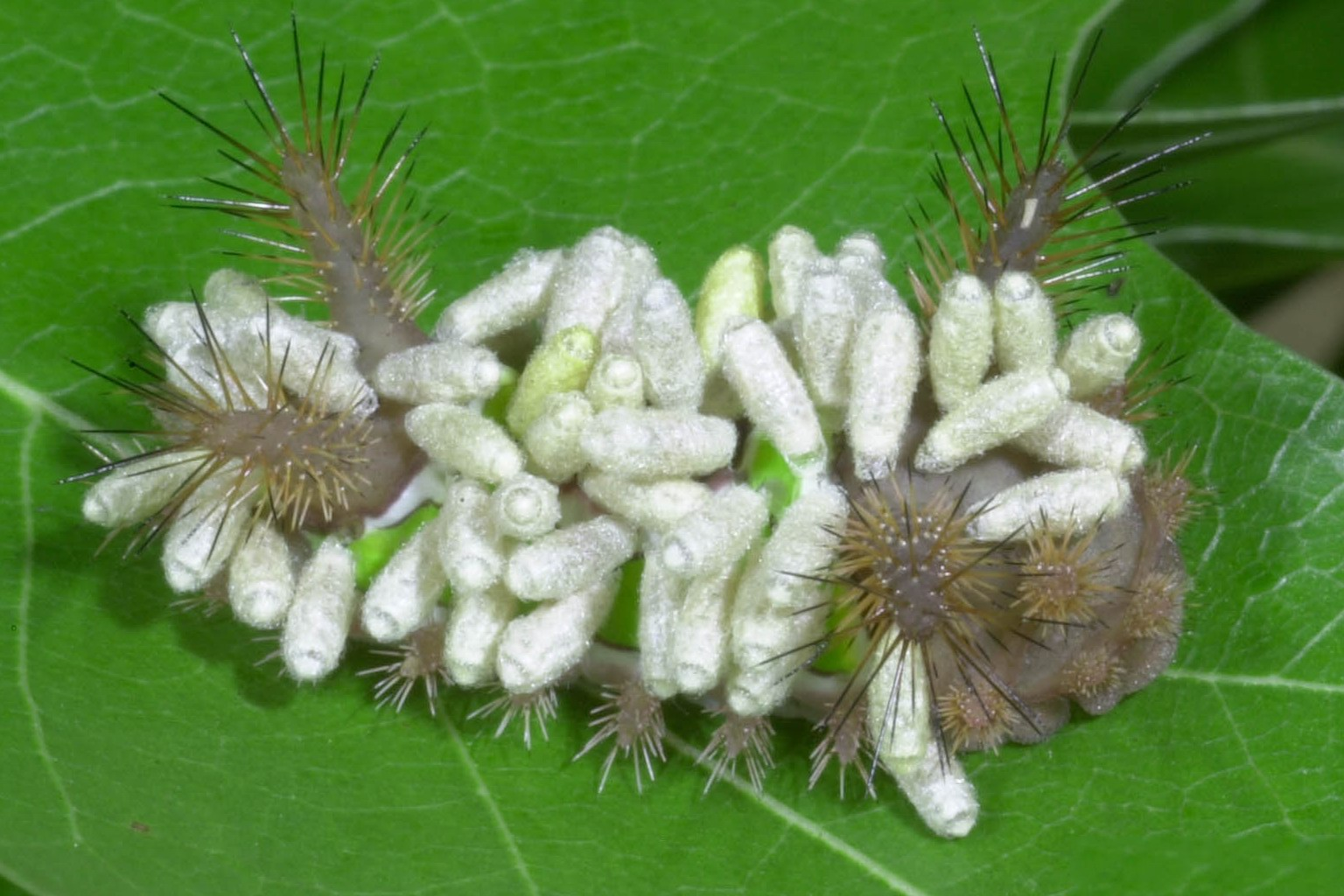
Saddleback caterpillar with parasitic braconid wasp larvae

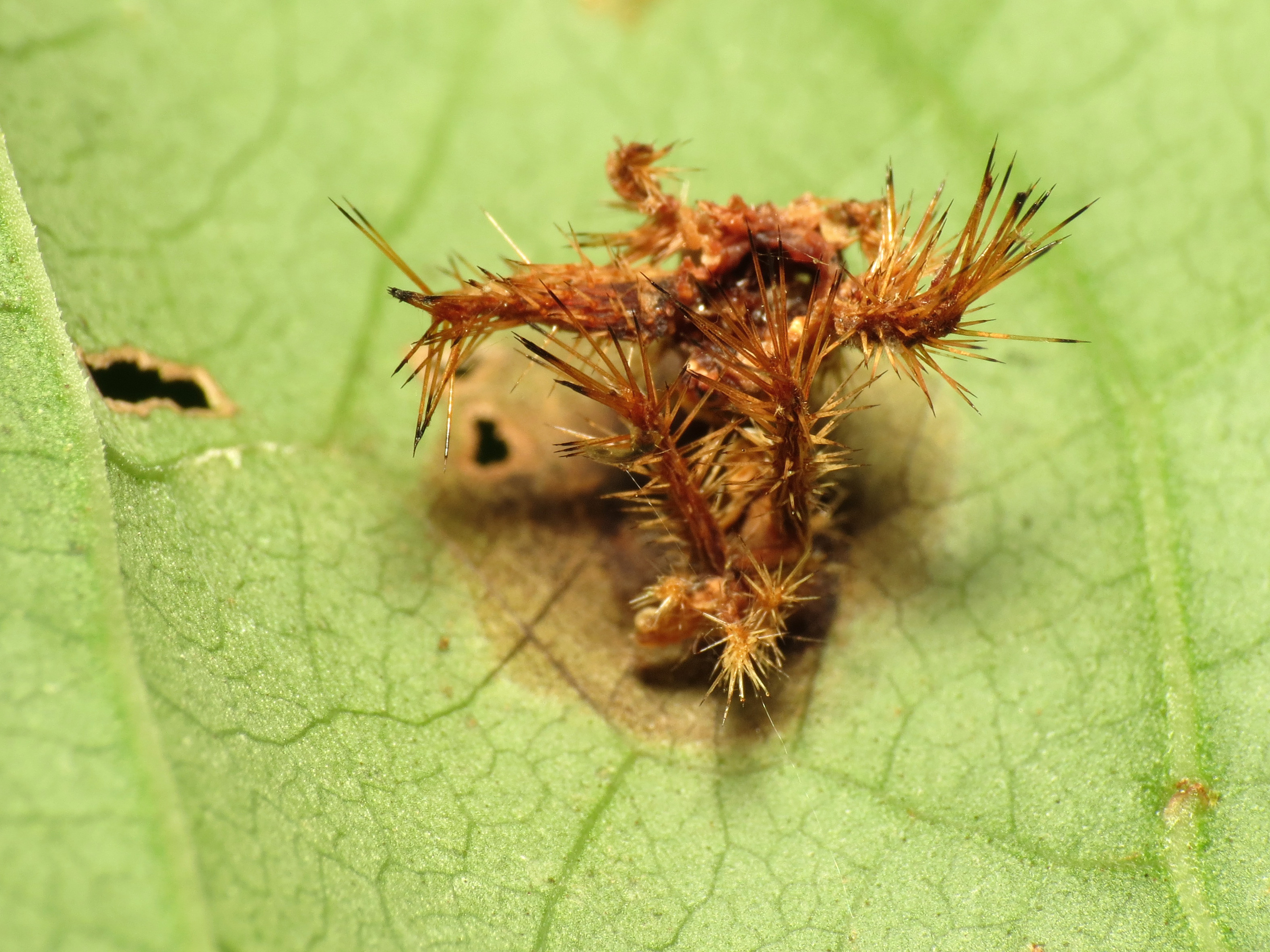
Saddleback Caterpillar remains
