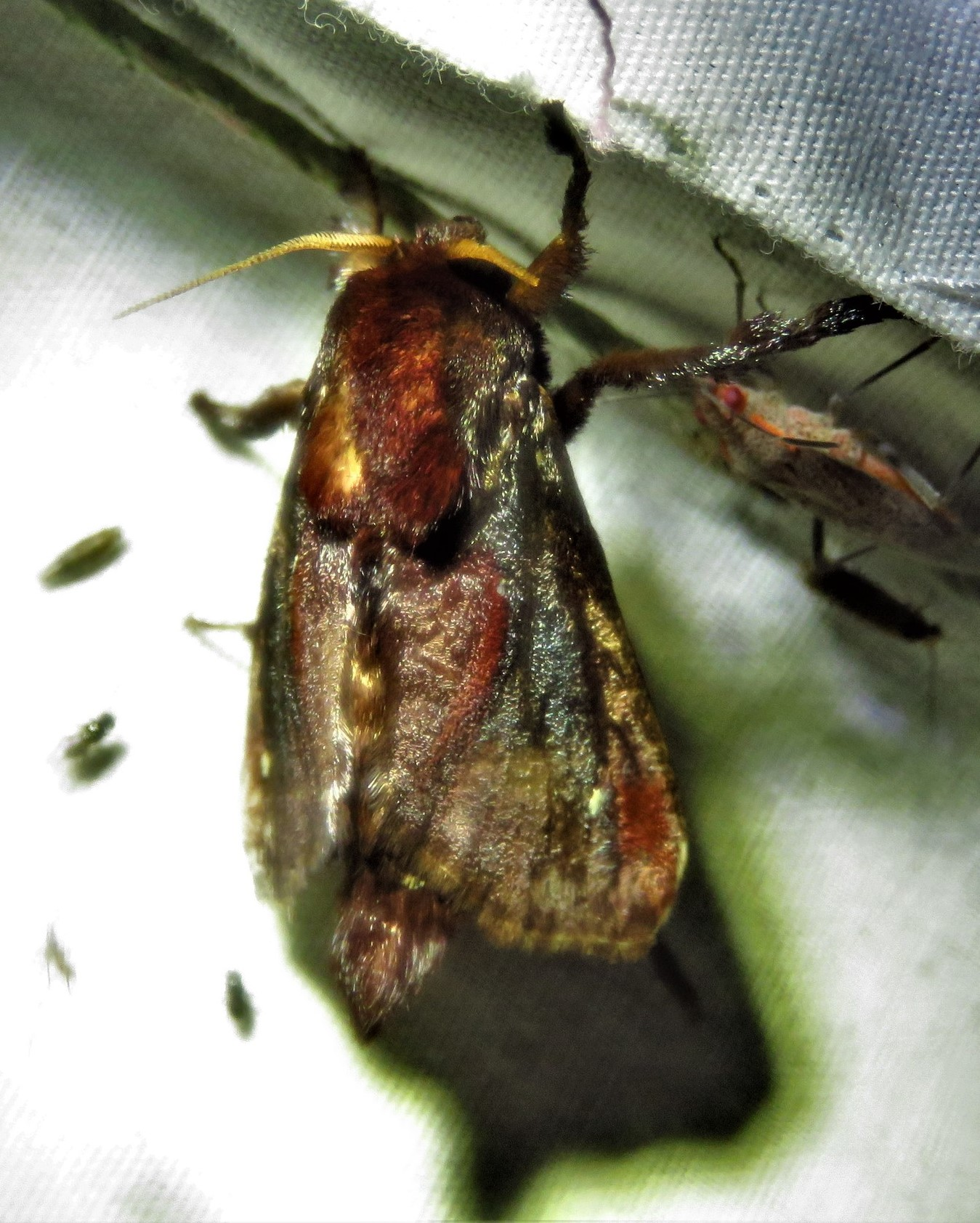

Scientific classification
- Domain: Eukaryota
- Kingdom: Animalia
- Phylum: Arthropoda
- Class: Insecta
- Order: Lepidoptera
- Family: Limacodidae
- Genus: Acharia
- Species: A. extensa

Binomial name
- Acharia extensa (Schaus, 1896)

Synonyms
- Sibine extensa Schaus, 1896

= Acharia extensa =

Species of moth

Acharia extensa is a species of moth in the family Limacodidae. It is found in Mexico and the United States, where it has been recorded from the southern tip of Florida.

The larvae have been recorded feeding on Inga species, Quercus species, Byrsonima crassifolia and Coffea arabica.
