= Acharia apicalis =

Scientific classification
- Kingdom: Animalia
- Phylum: Arthropoda
- Class: Insecta
- Order: Lepidoptera
- Family: Limacodidae
- Genus: Acharia
- Species: A. apicalis

Binomial name
- Acharia apicalis (Dyar, 1900)

Synonyms
- Sibine apicalis

Species of moth

Acharia apicalis is a species of moth native to Central America and South America.

There are up to four generations per year in Ecuador which can cause considerable damage to bananas in certain areas.
