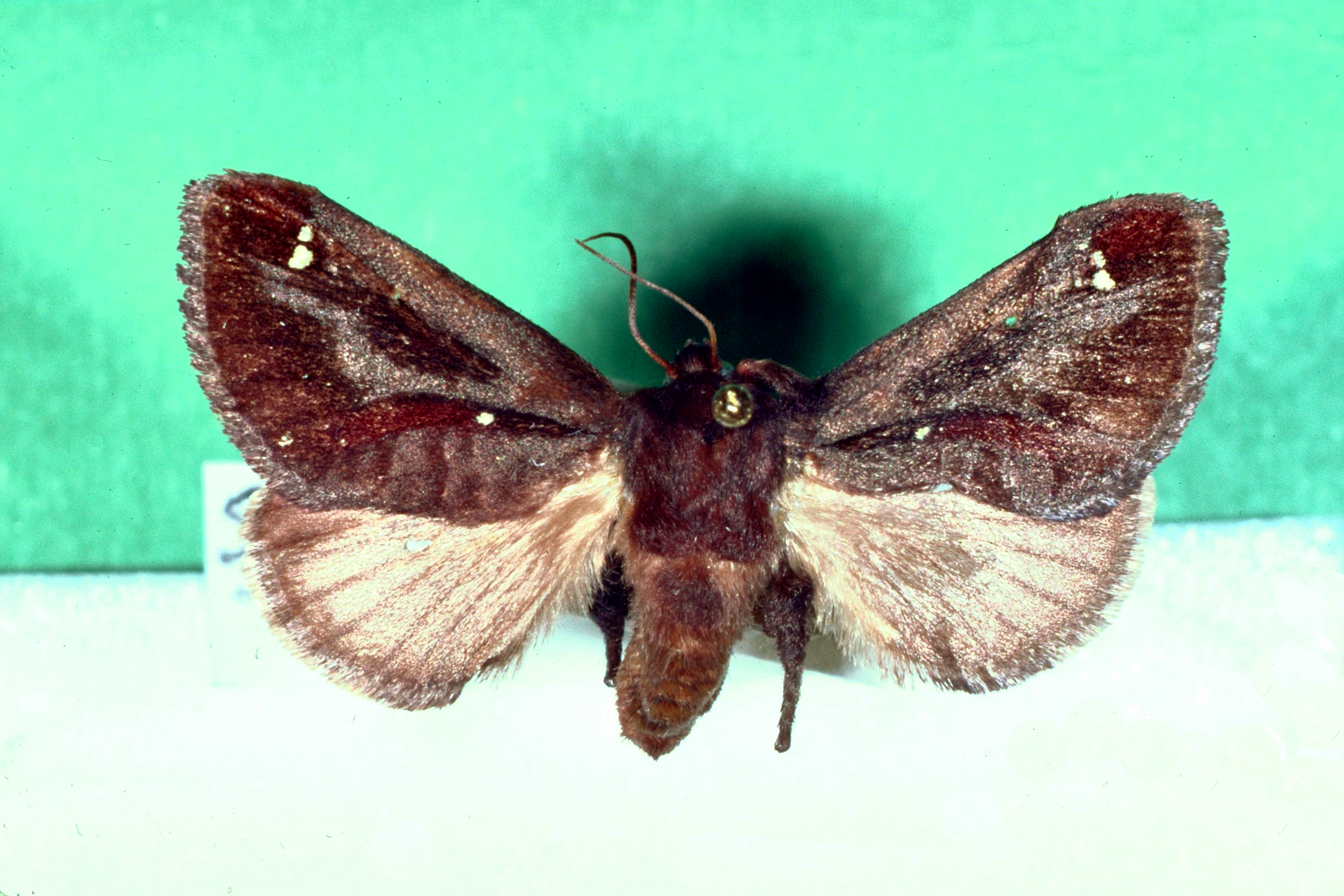
- Acharia stimulea

Scientific classification
- Kingdom: Animalia
- Phylum: Arthropoda
- Clade: Pancrustacea
- Class: Insecta
- Order: Lepidoptera
- Family: Limacodidae
- Subfamily: Limacodinae
- Genus: Acharia; Hübner, 1819

= Acharia (moth) =

Genus of moths

Acharia is a genus of moths in the family Limacodidae.

== Species ==
The following species are classified in the genus. This species list may be incomplete.

- Acharia affinis (Möschler, 1883)
- Acharia apicalis (Dyar, 1900)
- Acharia brunnus (Cramer, 1777)
- Acharia extensa (Schaus, 1896)
- Acharia hyperoche (Dognin, 1914)
- Acharia horrida (Dyar, 1905)
- Acharia nesea (Stoll, 1780)
- Acharia ophelians (Dyar, 1927)
- Acharia saras Dyar
- Acharia stimulea (syn. Sibine stimulea) – saddleback caterpillar moth (Clemens, 1860)
