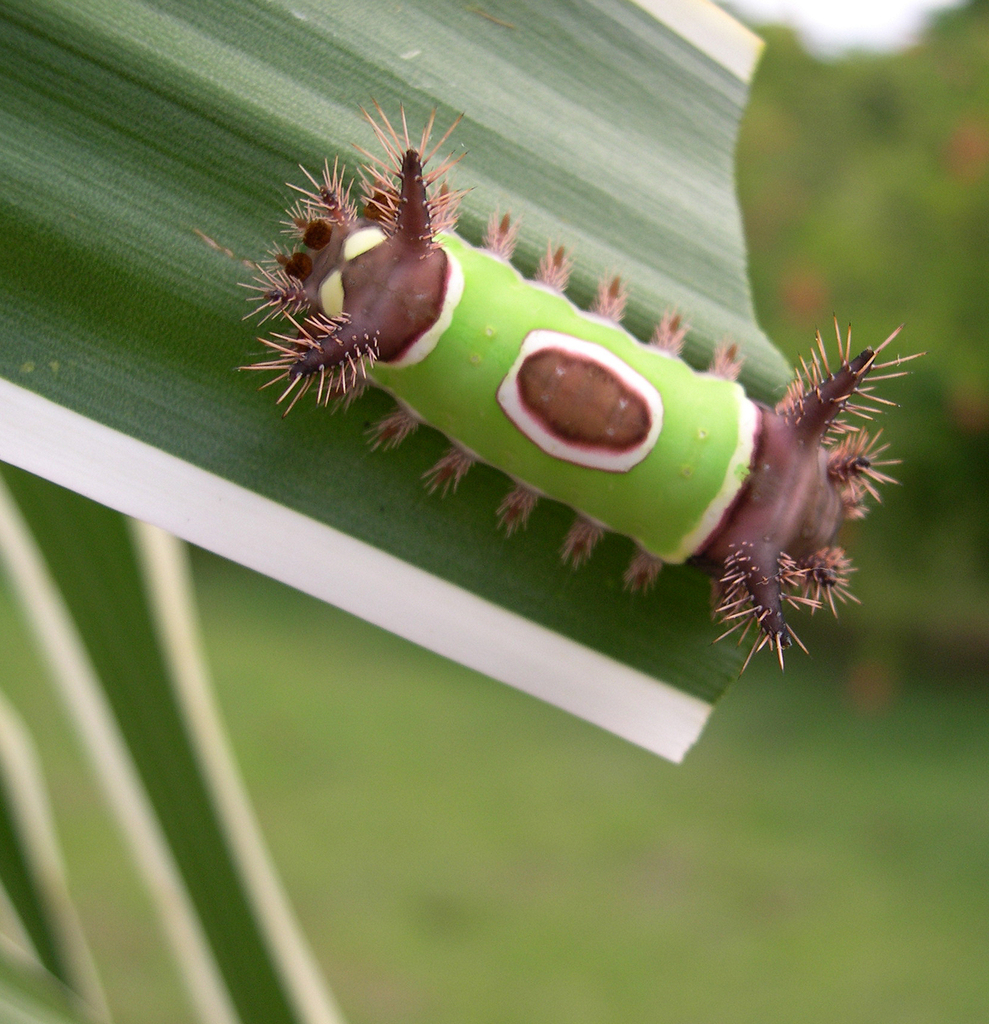

Scientific classification
- Kingdom: Animalia
- Phylum: Arthropoda
- Class: Insecta
- Order: Lepidoptera
- Family: Limacodidae
- Genus: Acharia
- Species: A. hyperoche

Binomial name
- Acharia hyperoche Hübner, 1819

= Acharia hyperoche =

Species of moth

Acharia hyperoche is a member of the genus Acharia (saddleback caterpillar moths and allies).

== Description ==
The caterpillar of Acharia hyperoche hides on the underside of the palm leaves on which it feeds, its green coloration helping it blend in. The body has fleshy protuberances that carry sharp spines. Brushing against the spines results in a red itchy rash and pain. Many other species in the same family (Limacodidae) are protected by similar defensive spines.

== Range ==
Most commonly found from the months of September to February, with a sudden spike in June. A. hyperoche is most commonly found in Costa Rica, Colombia, Panama, and Ecuador.
