= Coral vine =

Coral vine is a common name shared by two plants:

- Kennedia coccinea, species of flowering plant in the family Fabaceae, endemic to the south-west of Western Australia.
- Antigonon leptopus, a perennial in the buckwheat family (Polygonaceae) native to Mexico.
Plants called coral vine

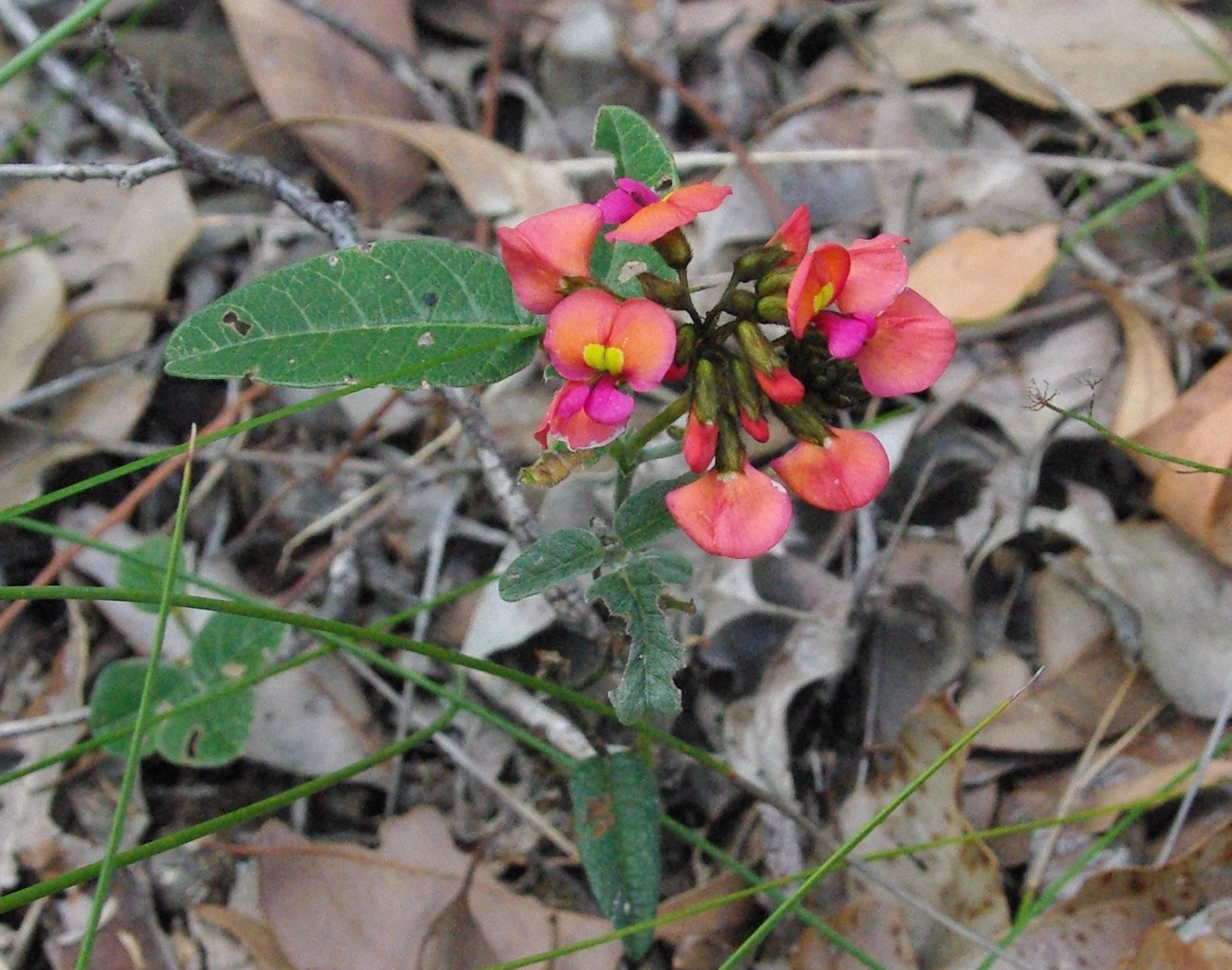
Kennedia coccinea

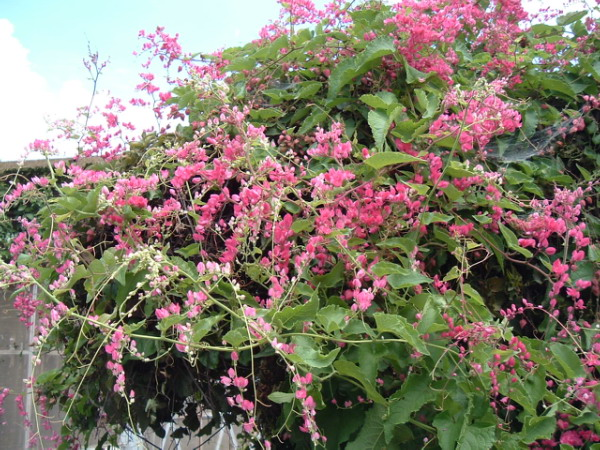
Antigonon leptopus
