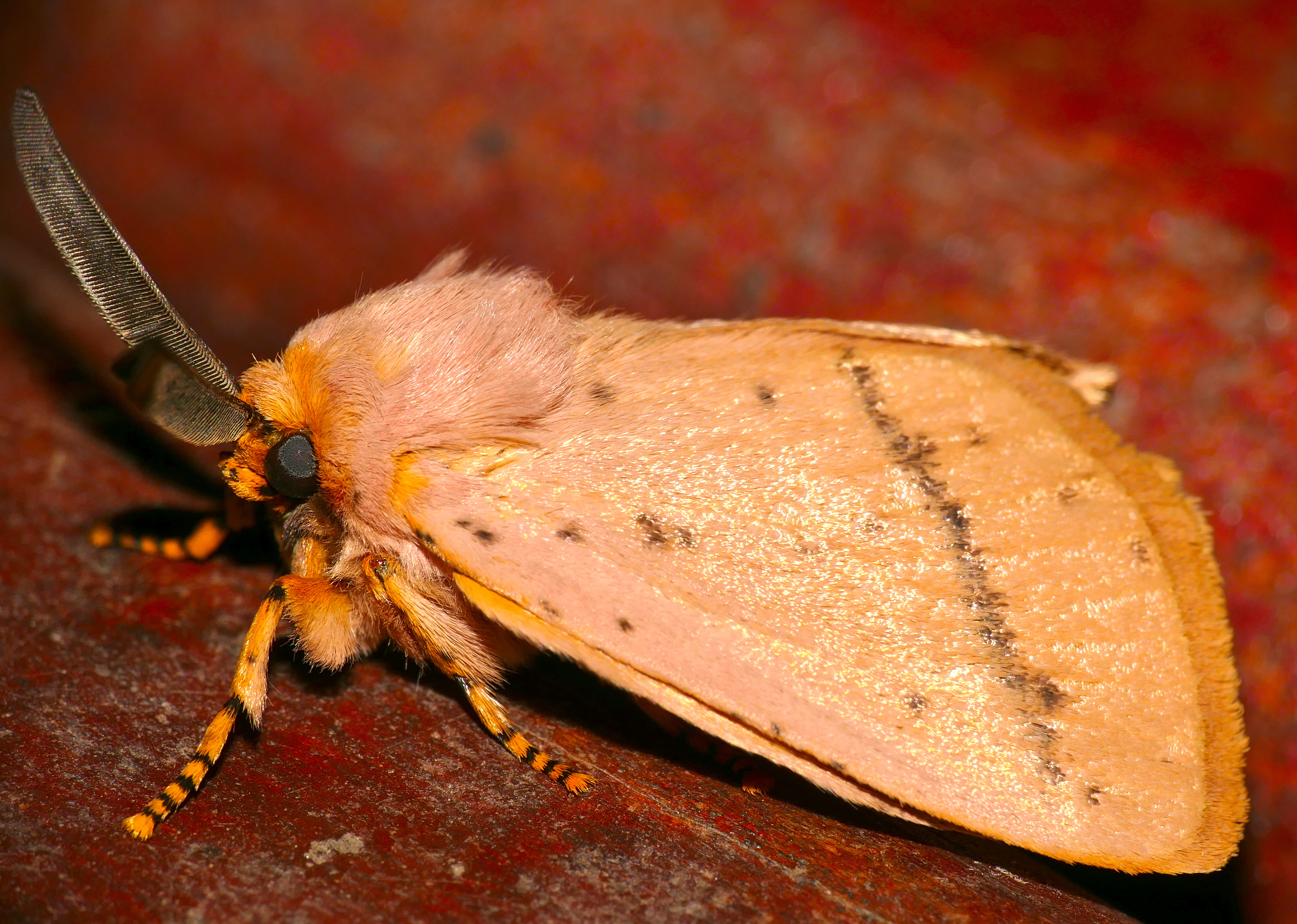

Scientific classification
- Domain: Eukaryota
- Kingdom: Animalia
- Phylum: Arthropoda
- Class: Insecta
- Order: Lepidoptera
- Family: Limacodidae
- Genus: Chrysopoloma
- Species: C. restricta

Binomial name
- Chrysopoloma restricta (Distant, 1899)

= Chrysopoloma restricta =

Species of moth

Chrysopoloma restricta is a moth in the genus Chrysopoloma. It is in the family Chrysopolominae.

== Distribution ==
Chrysopoloma restricta occurs in DR Congo, South Africa, and Tanzania.
