= Hamartia medora =

Scientific classification
- Domain: Eukaryota
- Kingdom: Animalia
- Phylum: Arthropoda
- Class: Insecta
- Order: Lepidoptera
- Family: Limacodidae
- Genus: Hamartia
- Species: H. medora

Binomial name
- Hamartia medora Hering, 1937

Species of moth

Hamartia medora is a species of slug moth described by Erich Martin Hering in 1937. It is in the subfamily Chrysopolominae.

== Subspecies ==
- Hamartia medora medora
- Hamartia medora moulini Rougeot, 1977

== Distribution ==
Hamartia medora occurs in Ethiopia and South Africa.
