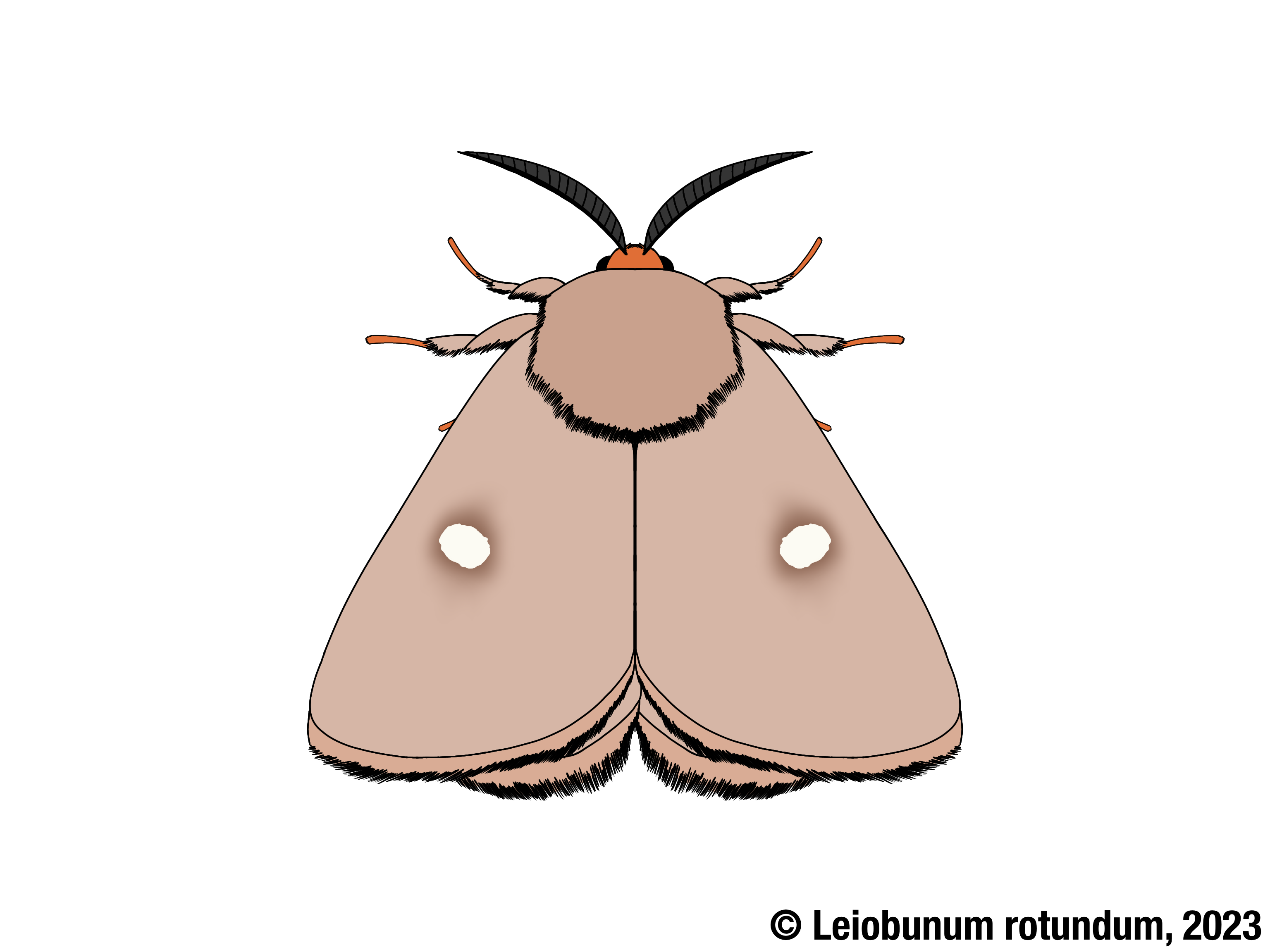

Scientific classification
- Domain: Eukaryota
- Kingdom: Animalia
- Phylum: Arthropoda
- Class: Insecta
- Order: Lepidoptera
- Family: Limacodidae
- Genus: Chrysopoloma
- Species: C. pallens

Binomial name
- Chrysopoloma pallens Hering, 1925

= Chrysopoloma pallens =

Species of moth

Chrysopoloma pallens is a species of slug moth in the subfamily Chrysopolominae.

== Distribution ==
The distribution of Chrysopoloma pallens is:

- DR Congo
- South Africa
- Tanzania
- Zambia
