= Chrysopoloma varia =

Scientific classification
- Domain: Eukaryota
- Kingdom: Animalia
- Phylum: Arthropoda
- Class: Insecta
- Order: Lepidoptera
- Family: Limacodidae
- Genus: Chrysopoloma
- Species: C. varia

Binomial name
- Chrysopoloma varia (Distant, 1899)

Species of moth

Chrysopoloma varia is a moth in the genus Chrysopoloma. It is in the family Chrysopolominae.

== Distribution ==
Chrysopoloma varia occurs in South Africa, Tanzania, Zambia and Zimbabwe.
