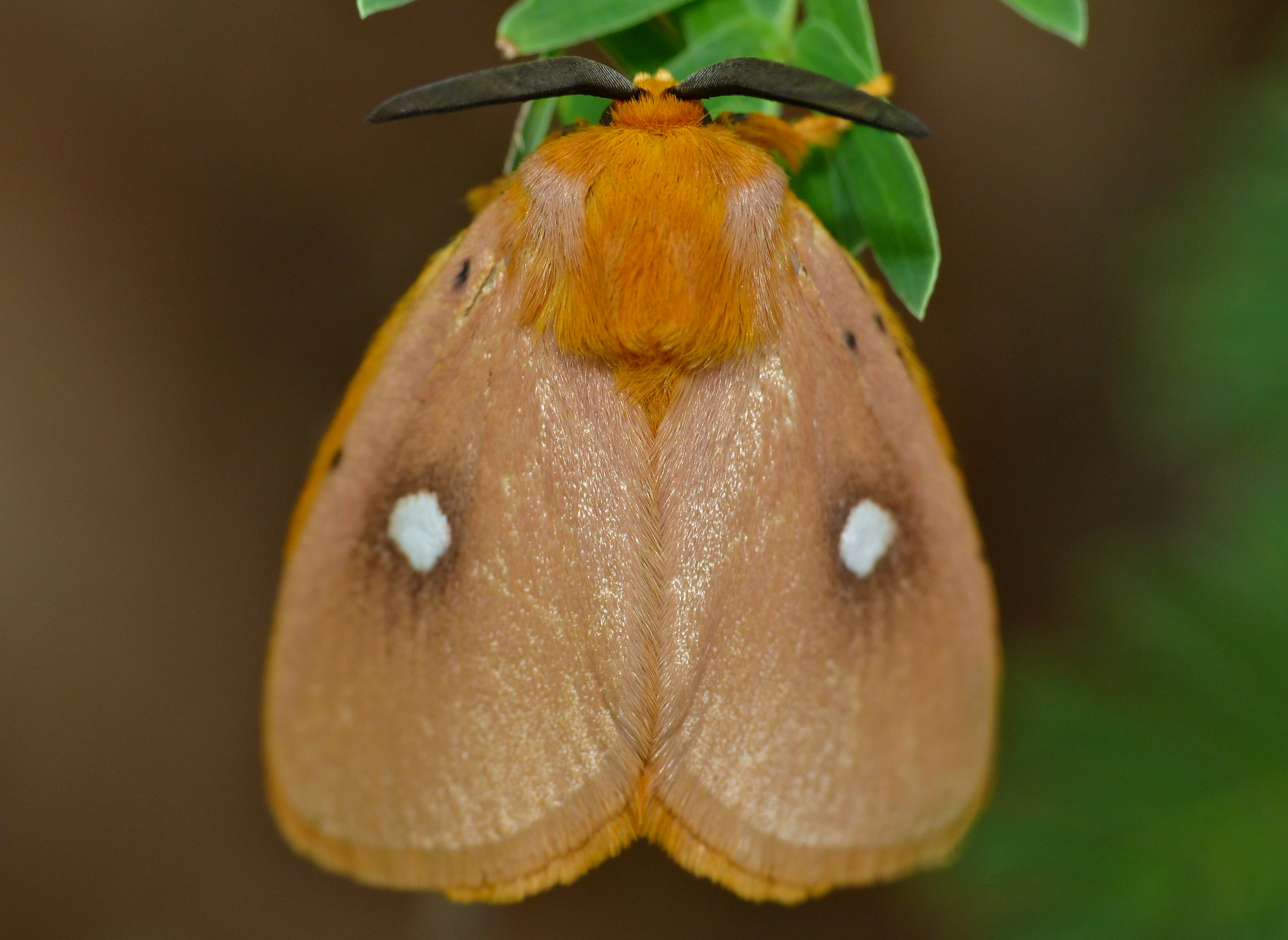
- Chrysopoloma isabellina

Scientific classification
- Kingdom: Animalia
- Phylum: Arthropoda
- Class: Insecta
- Order: Lepidoptera
- Family: Limacodidae
- Subfamily: Chrysopolominae
- Genus: Chrysopoloma; Aurivillius, 1895

= Chrysopoloma =

Genus of moths

Chrysopoloma is a genus of moths in the subfamily Chrysopolominae. It is the type genus of the subfamily.

== List of species ==
- Chrysopoloma bicolor
- Chrysopoloma citrina
- Chrysopoloma crawshayi
- Chrysopoloma flaviceps
- Chrysopoloma flavipennis
- Chrysopoloma flavoantennata
- Chrysopoloma isabellina
- Chrysopoloma nigrociliata
- Chrysopoloma nigromaculata
- Chrysopoloma nubila
- Chrysopoloma occidens
- Chrysopoloma opalina
- Chrysopoloma pallens
- Chrysopoloma paupera
- Chrysopoloma restricta
- Chrysopoloma rosea
- Chrysopoloma rudis
- Chrysopoloma similis
- Chrysopoloma varia
- Chrysopoloma variegata
- Chrysopoloma zernyi
