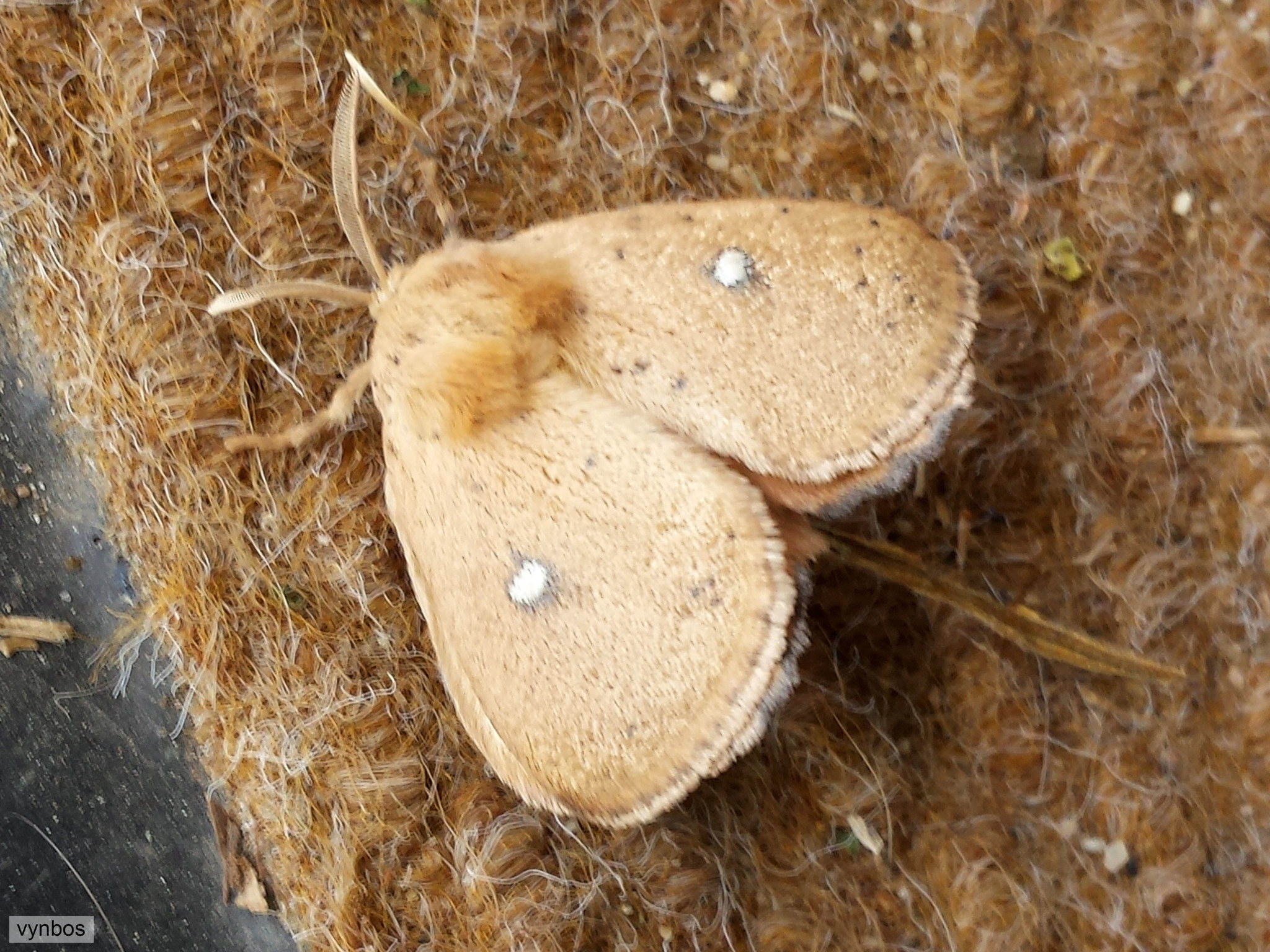

Scientific classification
- Domain: Eukaryota
- Kingdom: Animalia
- Phylum: Arthropoda
- Class: Insecta
- Order: Lepidoptera
- Family: Limacodidae
- Genus: Hamartia
- Species: H. clarissa

Binomial name
- Hamartia clarissa Hering, 1937

= Hamartia clarissa =

Species of moth

Hamartia clarissa is a species of slug moth described by Erich Martin Hering in 1937.
