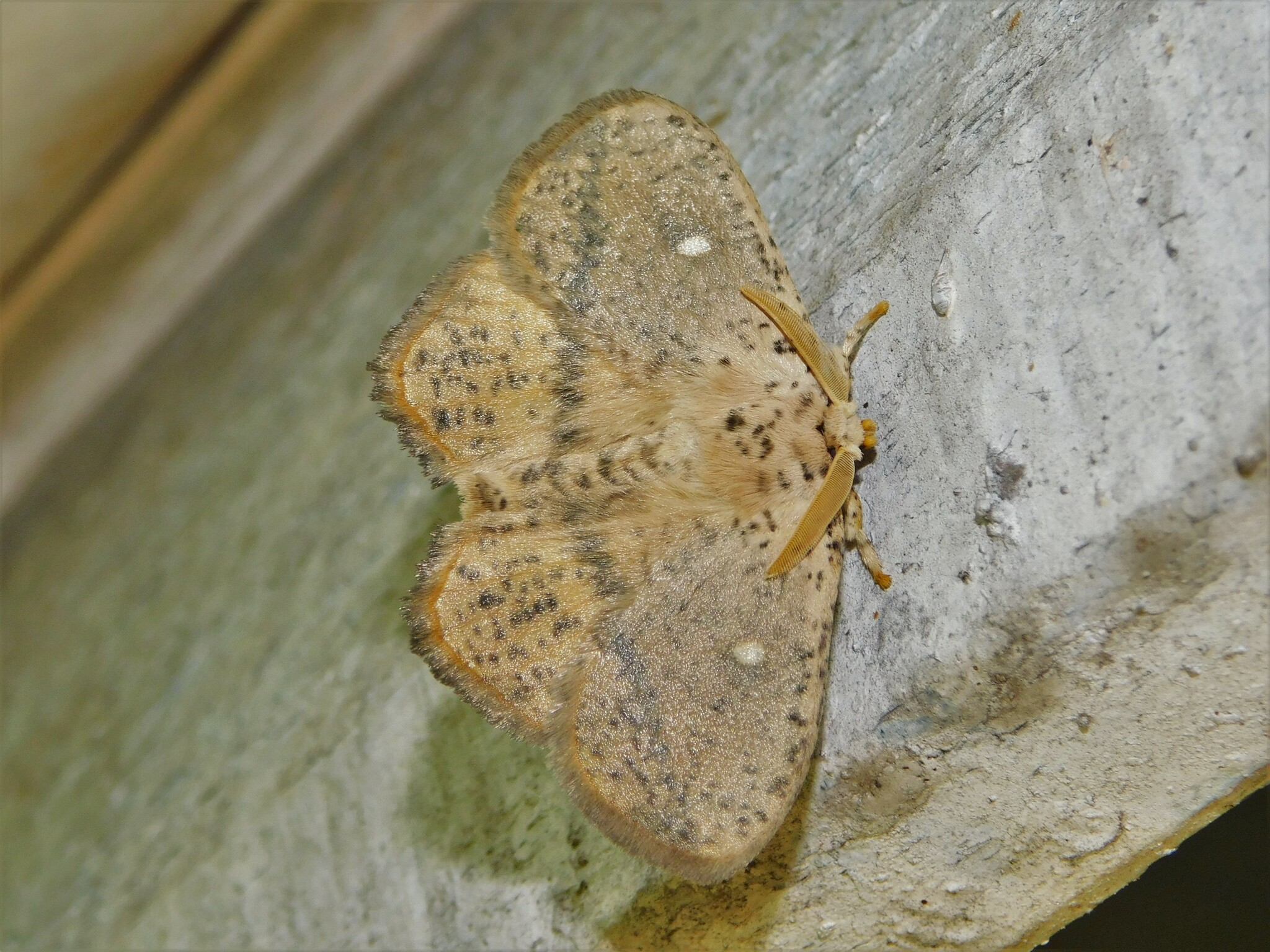

Scientific classification
- Kingdom: Animalia
- Phylum: Arthropoda
- Clade: Pancrustacea
- Class: Insecta
- Order: Lepidoptera
- Family: Limacodidae
- Subfamily: Chrysopolominae
- Genus: Achrocerides; Hering, 1937
- Species: A. theorini

Binomial name
- Achrocerides theorini (Aurivillius, 1891)

Synonyms
- Chrysopoloma theorini

= Achrocerides =

Species of moth

Achrocerides is a monotypic genus of slug moths in the subfamily Chrysopolominae. It contains a single species, Achrocerides theorini.

== Distribution ==
The distribution of Achrocerides theorini is mostly Central Africa.
