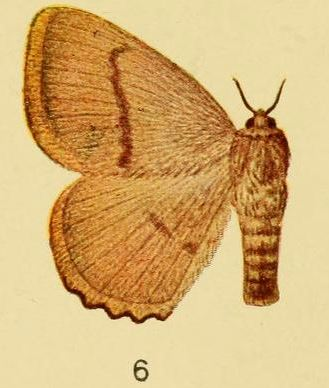

Scientific classification
- Kingdom: Animalia
- Phylum: Arthropoda
- Class: Insecta
- Order: Lepidoptera
- Family: Limacodidae
- Genus: Chrysopoloma
- Species: C. nigrociliata

Binomial name
- Chrysopoloma nigrociliata Aurivillius, 1905

= Chrysopoloma nigrociliata =

Species of moth

Chrysopoloma nigrociliata is a species of slug moth described by Per Olof Christopher Aurivillius in 1905.

== Distribution ==
This species was found in Nigeria.
