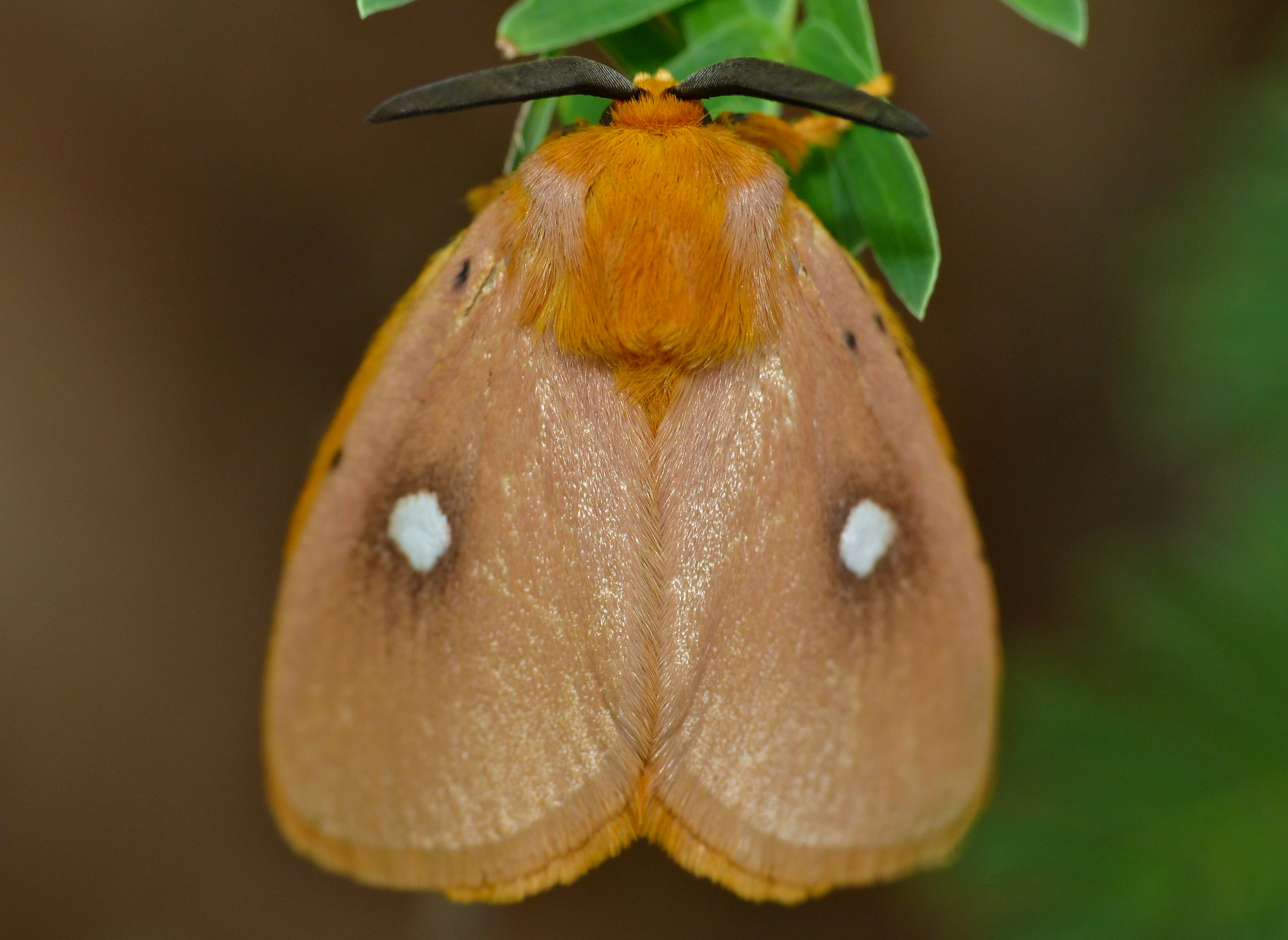
- Adult
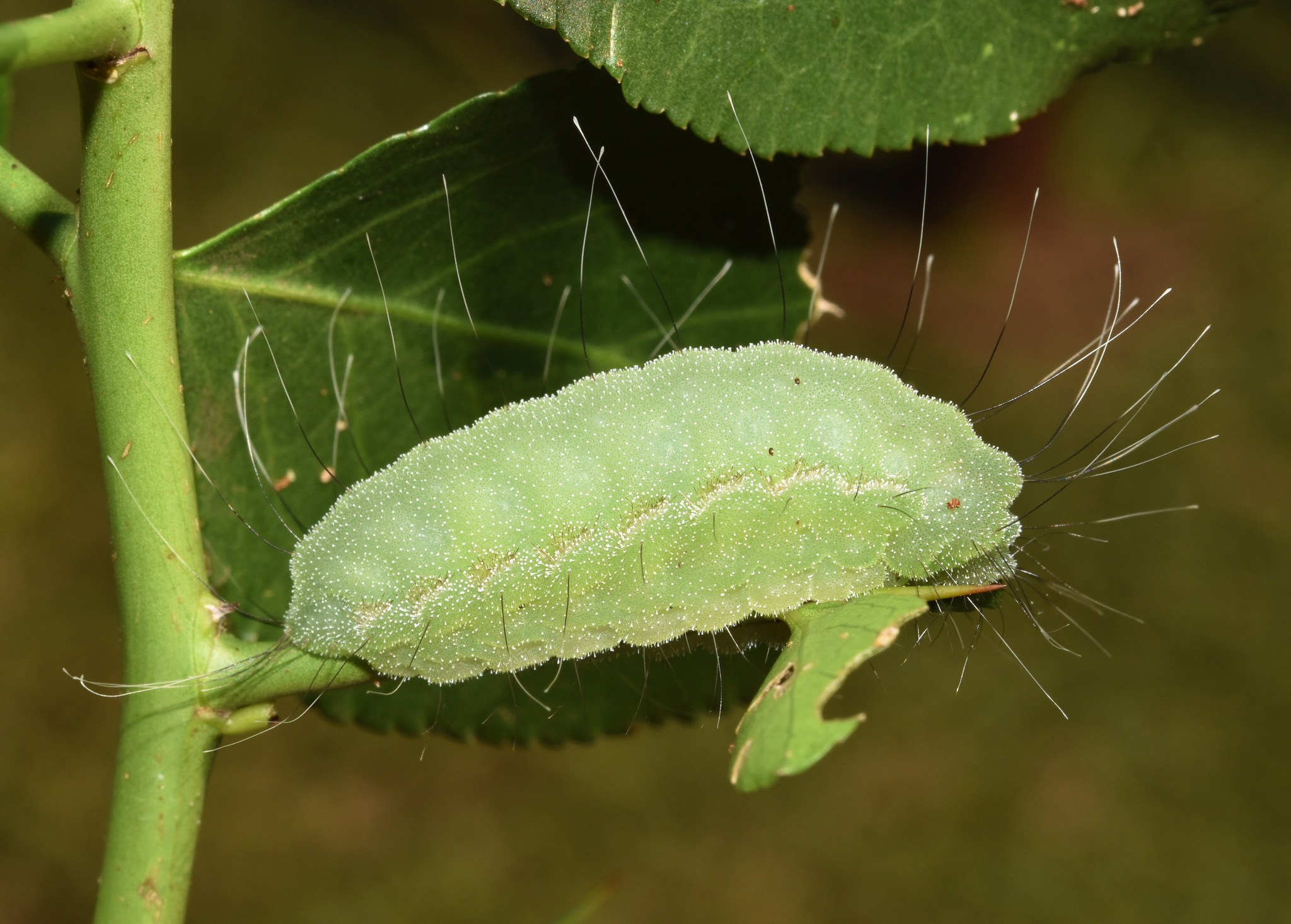
- Larvae

Scientific classification
- Domain: Eukaryota
- Kingdom: Animalia
- Phylum: Arthropoda
- Class: Insecta
- Order: Lepidoptera
- Family: Limacodidae
- Genus: Chrysopoloma
- Species: C. isabellina

Binomial name
- Chrysopoloma isabellina (Aurivillius, 1895)

= Chrysopoloma isabellina =

Species of moth

Chrysopoloma isabellina, or Isabel’s slug moth, is a moth in the genus Chrysopoloma. It belongs to the subfamily Chrysopolominae.

== Distribution ==
Chrysopoloma isabellina occurs in Mozambique, South Africa, Tanzania and Zimbabwe.
