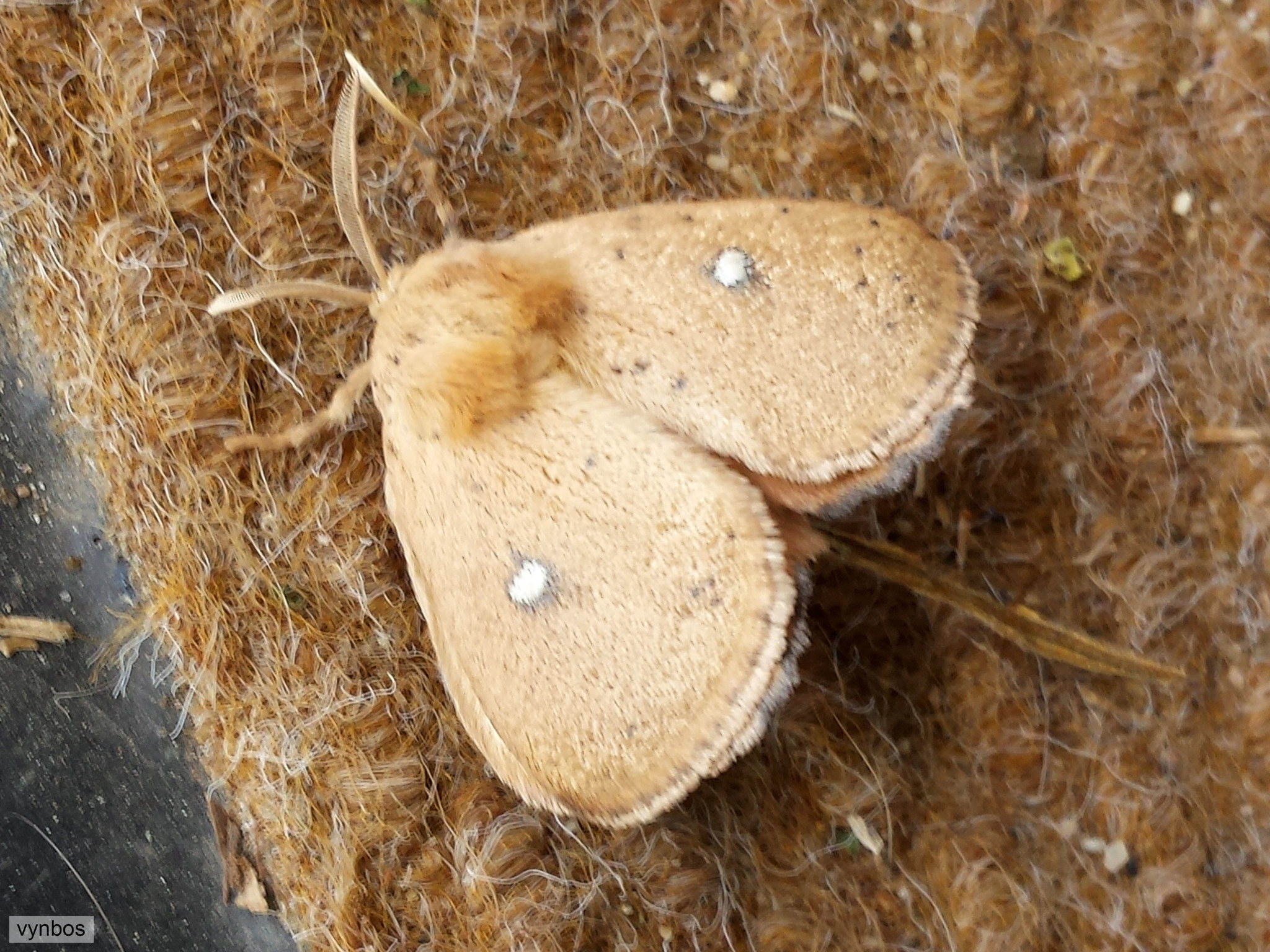
- Hamartia clarissa

Scientific classification
- Domain: Eukaryota
- Kingdom: Animalia
- Phylum: Arthropoda
- Class: Insecta
- Order: Lepidoptera
- Family: Limacodidae
- Subfamily: Chrysopolominae
- Genus: Hamartia; Hering, 1937

Species
- See text

= Hamartia (moth) =

Genus of moths

Hamartia is a genus of slug moths described by Erich Martin Hering in 1937.

== Species ==
- Hamartia clarissa Hering, 1937
- Hamartia medora Hering, 1937 (type species)
- Hamartia paupera (Hering, 1925)

== Distribution ==
This genus occurs in southern Africa.
