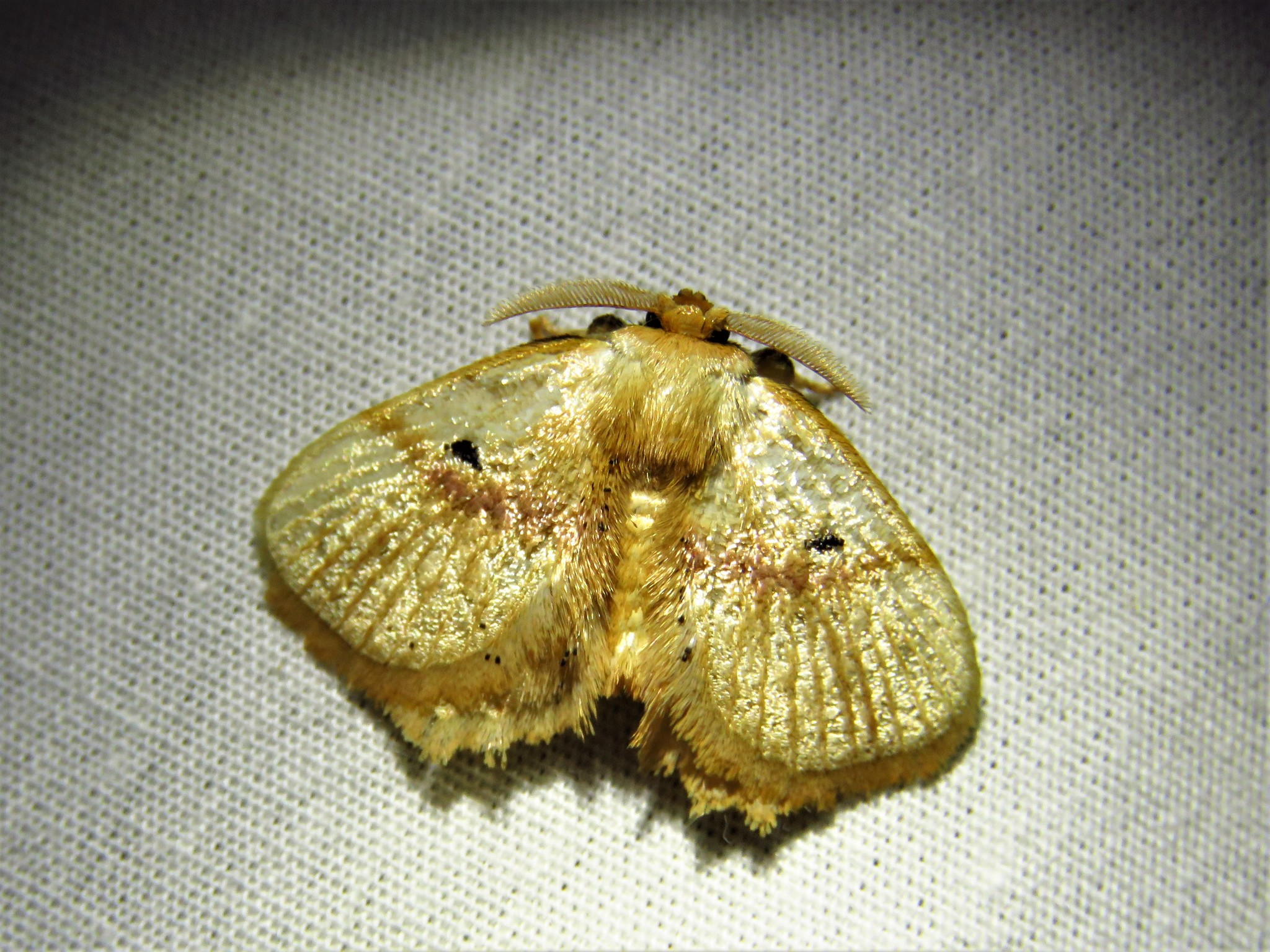

Scientific classification
- Kingdom: Animalia
- Phylum: Arthropoda
- Class: Insecta
- Order: Lepidoptera
- Family: Limacodidae
- Genus: Chrysectropa
- Species: C. roseofasciata

Binomial name
- Chrysectropa roseofasciata (Aurivillius, 1910)

= Chrysectropa =

Species of moth

Chrysectropa roseofasciata is a species of moth in the genus Chrysectropa. It is in the subfamily Chrysopolominae. This is the only species in the genus.

== Distribution ==
Chrysectropa roseofasciata occurs in Angola, Cameroon, Congo, Democratic Republic of the Congo, Gabon and Sierra Leone.
