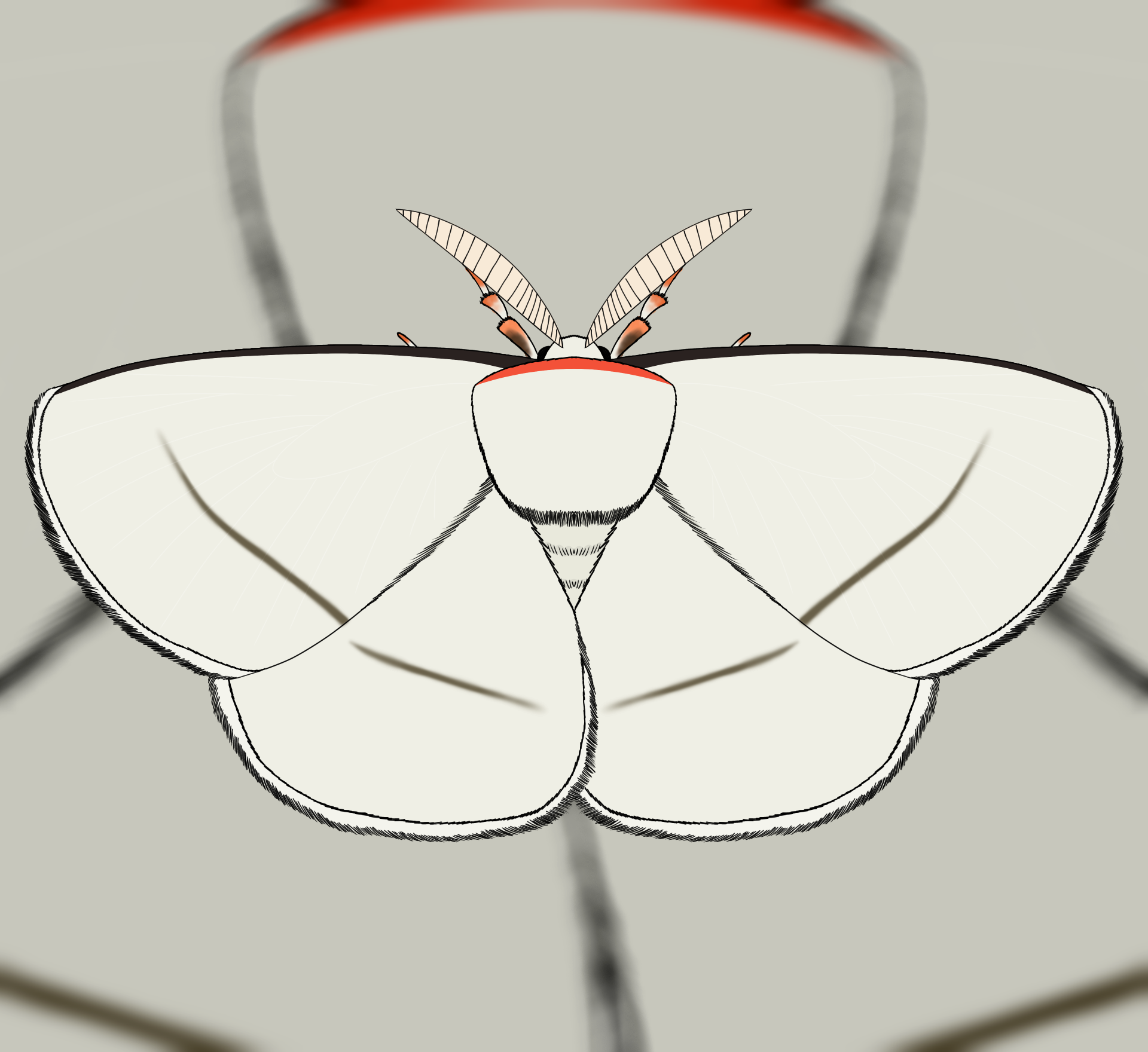

Scientific classification
- Kingdom: Animalia
- Phylum: Arthropoda
- Class: Insecta
- Order: Lepidoptera
- Family: Limacodidae
- Genus: Chrysopolomides
- Species: C. nivea

Binomial name
- Chrysopolomides nivea (Aurivillius, 1903)

= Chrysopolomides =

Moth in the subfamily Chrysopolominae

Chrysopolomides is a monotypic genus of slug moths of the subfamily Chrysopolominae. It contains a single species, C. nivea.

== Distribution ==
Chrysopolomides nivea occurs in Cameroon, Central African Republic and Ghana.
