= Diquishia =

Scientific classification
- Kingdom: Animalia
- Phylum: Arthropoda
- Clade: Pancrustacea
- Class: Insecta
- Order: Lepidoptera
- Family: Limacodidae
- Subfamily: Chrysopolominae
- Genus: Diquishia; Kurshakov & Zolotuhin, 2016

Genus of slug moths

Diquishia is a genus of slug moths described by Kurshakov & Zolotuhin in 2016. It belongs to the subfamily Chrysopolominae.

== List of species ==
- Diquishia ansorgei (Bethune-Baker, 1911)
- Diquishia morion Kurshakov & Zolotuhin, 2016
