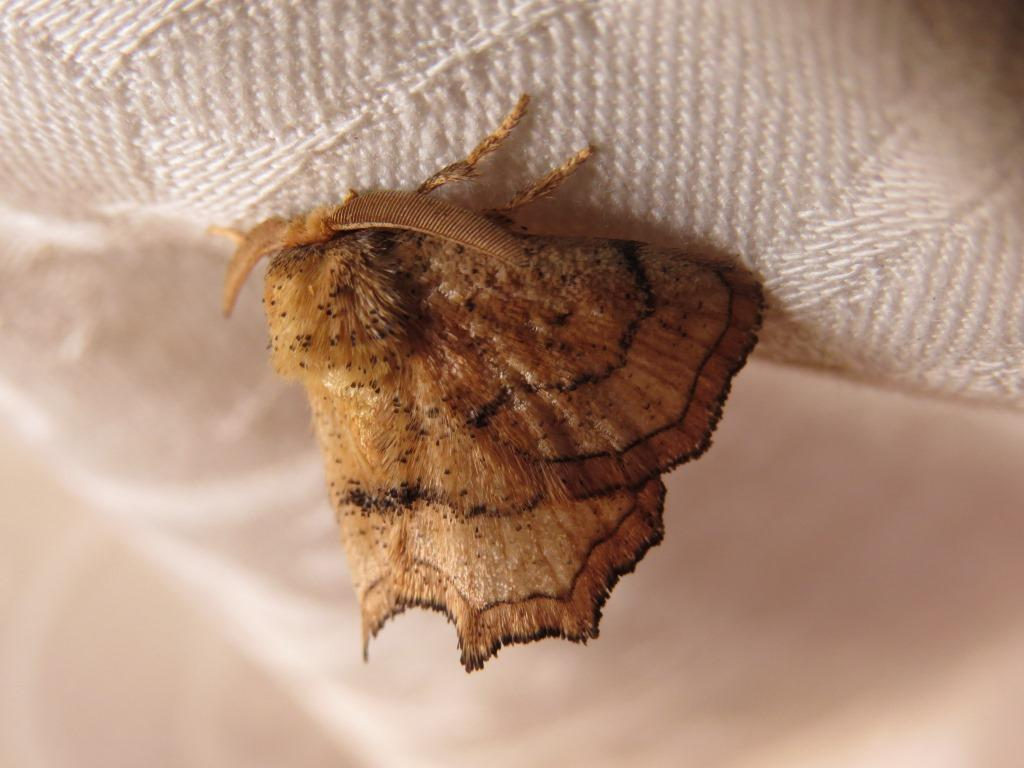
- Ectropa ancilis

Scientific classification
- Domain: Eukaryota
- Kingdom: Animalia
- Phylum: Arthropoda
- Class: Insecta
- Order: Lepidoptera
- Family: Limacodidae
- Subfamily: Chrysopolominae
- Genus: Ectropa; Wallengren, 1836

Species
- See text

= Ectropa =

Genus of moths

Ectropa is a genus of slug moths described by Hans Daniel Johan Wallengren in 1836.

== Species ==
- Ectropa adam Kurshakov & Zolotuhin, 2013
- Ectropa alberici Dufrane, 1945
- Ectropa ancilis Wallengren, 1863 (type species)
