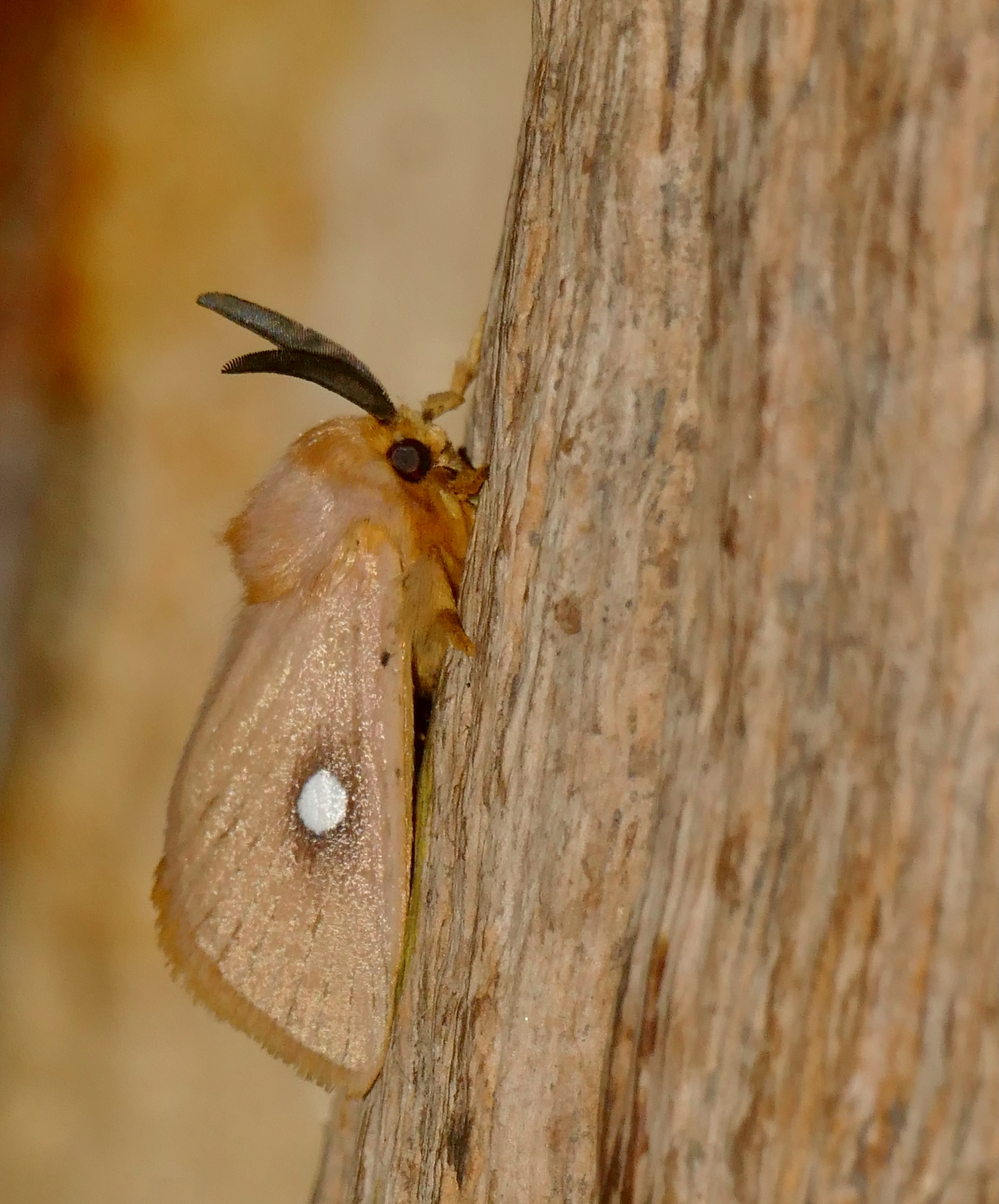
- Chrysopoloma isabellina

Scientific classification
- Kingdom: Animalia
- Phylum: Arthropoda
- Class: Insecta
- Order: Lepidoptera
- Family: Limacodidae
- Subfamily: Chrysopolominae (Aurivillius, 1895)

Type genus
- Chrysopoloma Aurivillius, 1895

Synonyms
- Ectropinae

= Chrysopolominae =

Subfamily of moths

Chrysopolominae is a subfamily of moths in the family Limacodidae. The type genus of this subfamily is Chrysopoloma. Chrysopolominae was originally a family (Chrysopolomidae) under the superfamily Zygaenoidea, consisting of two subfamilies, including about 30 species distributed in Africa. But in other newer documents, this family was downgraded and became a subfamily under Limacodidae. The two subfamilies originally under Chrysopolominae were merged to become the synonym of Chrysopolominae, Ectropinae.

== List of genera ==
According to Afromoths.org and ZooBank.org, this taxon includes the following genera:

- Achrocerides Hering, 1937
- Auripoloma Taberer, 2023
- Chrysectropa Bethune-Baker, 1911
- Chrysopoloma Aurivillius, 1895
- Chrysopolomides Hering, 1937
- Diquishia Kurshakov & Zolotuhin, 2016
- Ectropa Wallengren, 1863
- Ectropona Kurshakov & Zolotuhin, 2013
- Erythropteryx Hering, 1937
- Hamartia Hering, 1937
- Muscectropa Taberer, 2023
- Pseudectropona Taberer, 2023
- Scotinocerides Hering, 1937
- Strigivenifera Hering, 1937
- Vietteopoloma Hering, 1961
