= Sokrates Starynkiewicz Square =

Urban square and roundabout in Warsaw, Poland

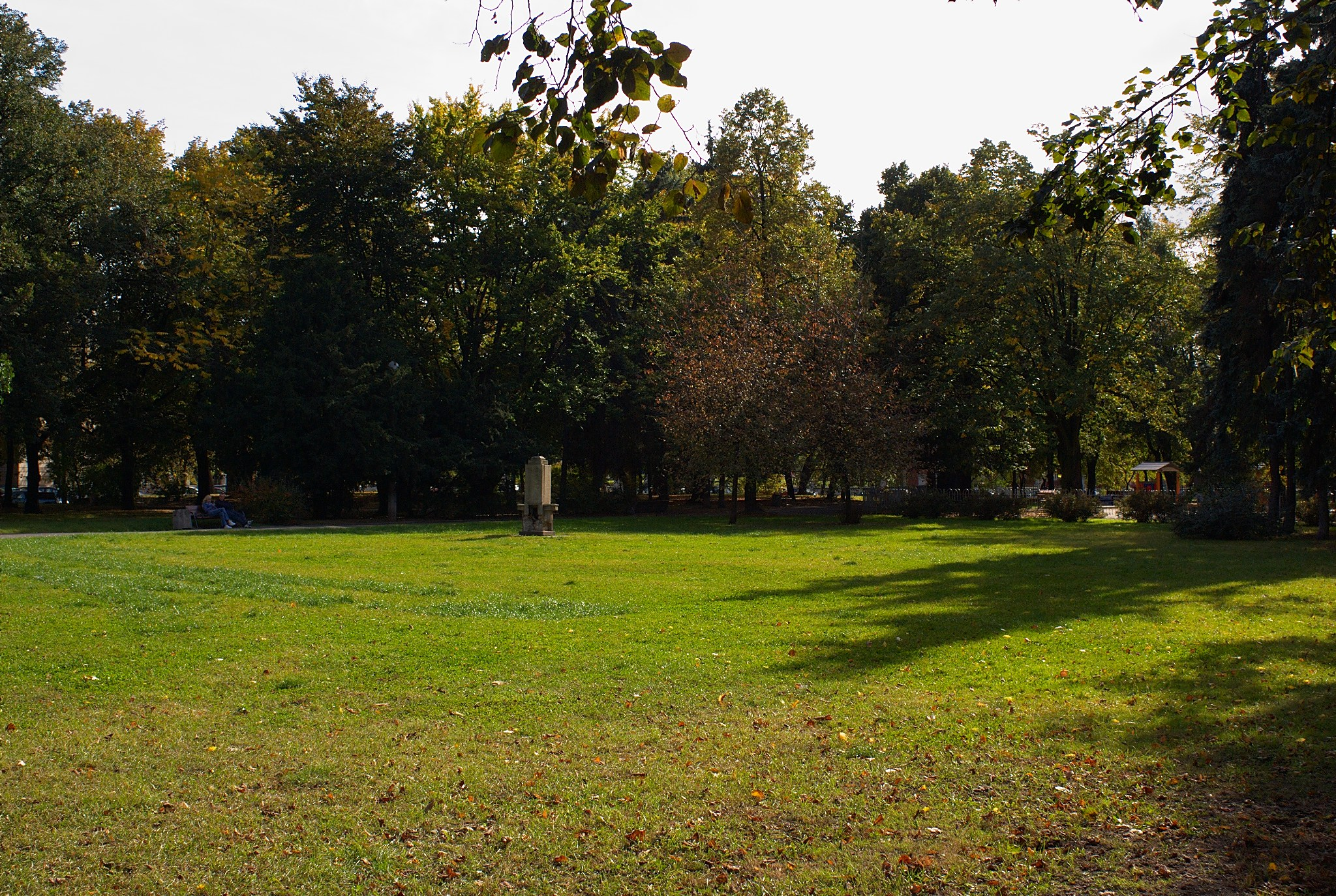
- The Grotowski Square, a part of the Starynkiewicz Square, in 2009.

- Location within Warsaw
- Namesake: Sokrates Starynkiewicz
- Location: Ochota, Warsaw, Poland
- Coordinates: 52°13′27.0″N 20°59′46.0″E
- North: Jerusalem Avenue
- East: Nowy Gród Street; Oczko Street
- South: Koszyki Street; Oczko Street
- West: Nowy Gród Street

Construction
- Completed: 1893

The Sokrates Starynkiewicz Square (Polish pronunciation: [sɔˈkra.tɛs sta.rɨŋˈkjɛ.vit͡ʂ]; Polish: Plac Sokratesa Starynkiewicza) is a triangular urban square in Warsaw, Poland, located within the neighbourhood of Filtry, within the Ochota district, between Koszyki Street, Lindley Street, and Jerusalem Avenue. Its large portion forms a park known as the Alfons Grotowski Square (Polish pronunciation: [ˈal.fɔns ɡrɔˈtɔf.ski]; Polish: Skwer im. Alfonsa Grotowskiego). It was developed in 1893, and in 1936, was turned into a garden square.

== Name ==
The urban square is named after Sokrates Starynkiewicz, the mayor of Warsaw from 1875 to 1892. Its large portion forms a garden square named after Alfons Grotowski, a 19th- and 20th-century engineer and co-creator of the city's waterworks and sewage system.

== History ==
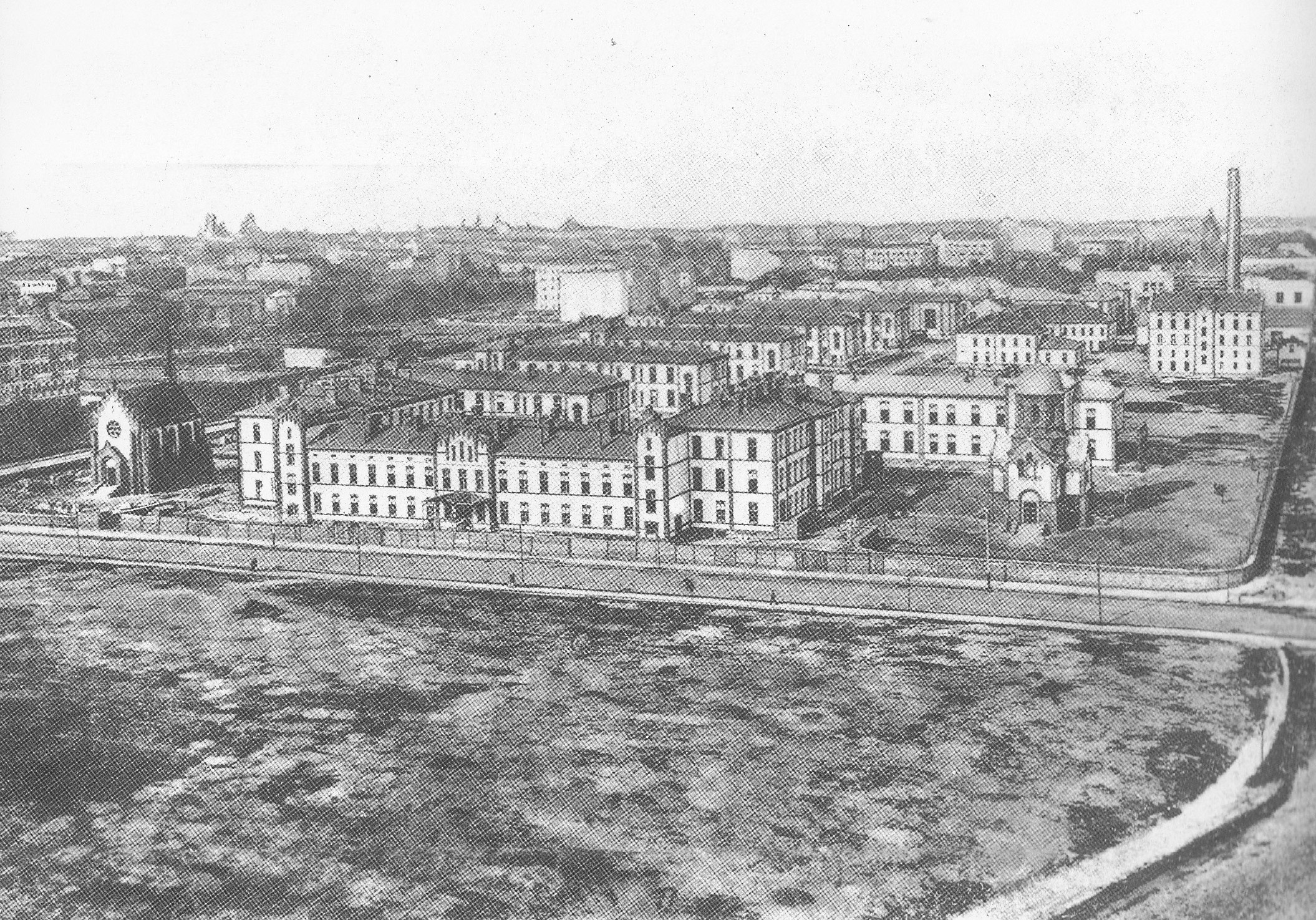
The Starynkiewicz Square in the early 1900s, together with the Child Jesus Chapel, Child Jesus Hospital, and Our Lady of Perpetual Help Church.

Since 1842, the area was crossed by Iron Street, while the square was ploted out in 1893, and named after Sokrates Starynkiewicz, the mayor of Warsaw from 1875 to 1892. It was developed to the north from the Lindley Filters. Prior to this, the name Starynkiewicz Street was used for the nearby Filers Street.

In 1902, to the west of the square was constructed the new building for the Child Jesus Hospital (now known as the Child Jesus Teaching Hospital), the largest medical facility in Warsaw. Next to it were also opened the Child Jesus Chapel, and the Our Lady of Perpetual Help Church, which were of Catholic and Eastern Orthodox denominations respectively. The latter was closed down in 1915, and deconstructed a few years later. The chappel was later expanded and elevated to the status of a church in 1925. Additionally, in 1901, next to the square at the corner of Lindley and Nowy Gród Streets, was placed a sandstone obelisk. It was originally erected in 1799 at the cemetery next to the original hospital building, and dedicated to its 30,000 deceased patients, who were buried there.

In 1921, on the other side of the square, was also opened the building of the Department of Obstetrics and Gynecology of the Medical University of Warsaw.

In 1926, the square was crossed with the narrow-gauge tracks of the Electric Commuter Railways.

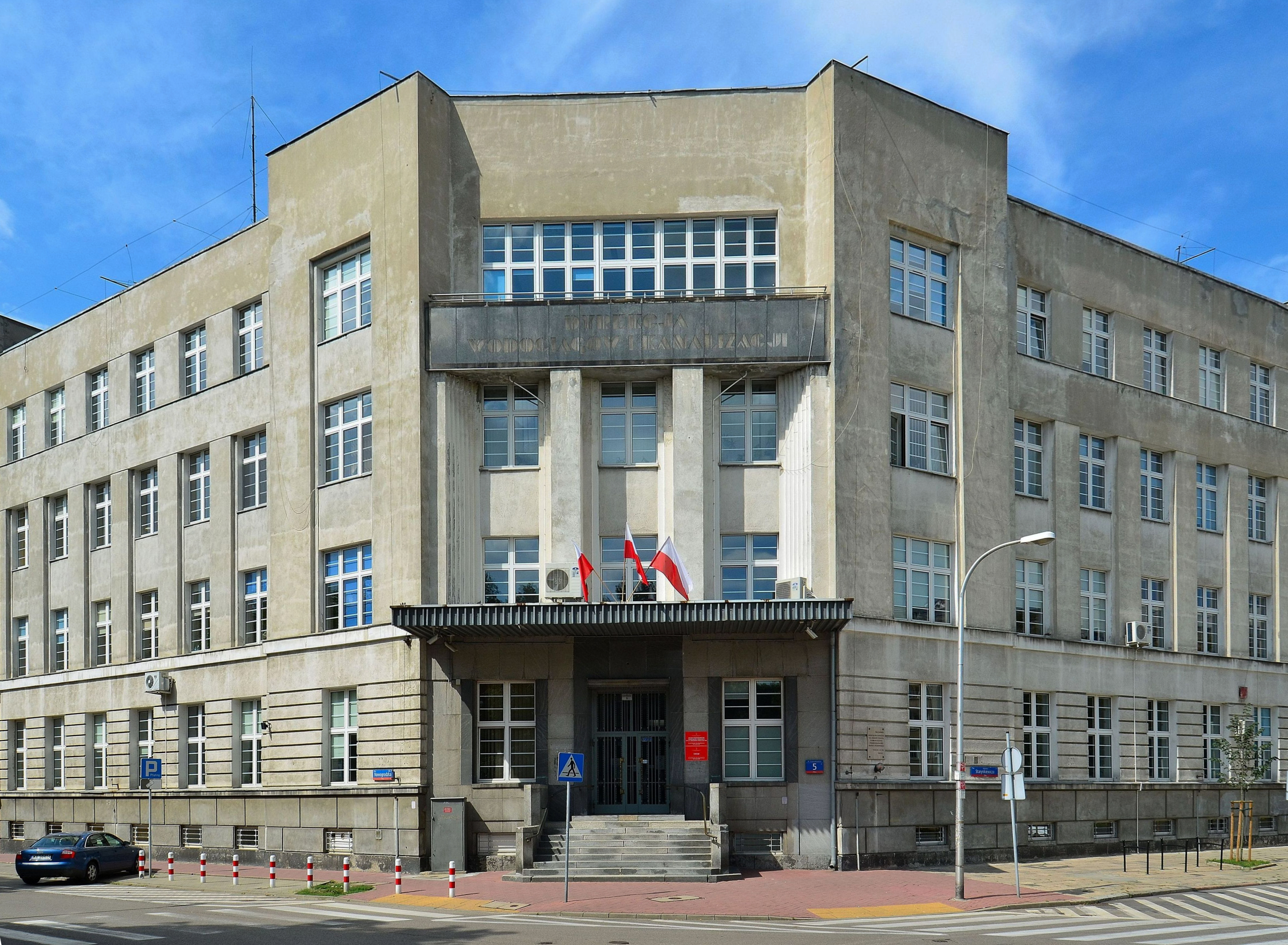
The headquarters building of the Municipal Waterworks and Sewage Company of the Capital City of Warsaw, opened in 1930.

Between 1928 and 1930, the large headquarters building of the Waterworks and Sewage Company Directorate (since 1951 known as the Municipal Waterworks and Sewage Company of the Capital City of Warsaw) was constructed at 5 Starynkiewicz Square. Originally designed by Stefan Szyller in the neoclassical, it was completed according to a modified design by Romuald Miller as a modernist object after a construction disaster caused by construction errors.

In 1933, a southern portion of Iron Street, which formed the eastern boundary of the square, was renamed after William Heerlein Lindley, the head engineer of the city's waterworks and sewage system.

In 1936, at the corner of Starynkiewicz Square and Jerusalem Avenue, was opened the Turist House designed by Władysław Borawski, which functioned as a hotel, mostly housing school trips. In 1944, the building was the site of heavy fighting during the Warsaw Uprising. It was severely damaged and rebuilt in 1947. Due to its location near the House of the Polish World, the largest printing house in the city, the building housed editorial offices of several new agencies and publishers, such as Trybuna Ludu and Rzeczpospolita. In 1943, in the building at 1 and 3 Starynkiewicz Square was opened

In 1936, to celebrate the 50th anniversary of the opening of the Lindley Filters, a large portion of the square was developed into a small park, named after Alfons Grotowski, an engineer and co-creator of the city's waterworks and sewage system.

Most of the buildings around the square survived the Second World War without larger damage. On 15 September 1945, there was re-opened one of the first tram lines in the city, connecting the square to the Warsaw Chopin Airport.

In 1946, at the square was hosted a farewell party for 107 departing workers from Yugoslavia, whom helped in rebuilding of the city after the Second World War. The event was commemorated with a monument, in a form of a rock with engraved inspiration, placed at the corner of Lindley and Koszyki Streets is.

In 1994, to the west from the square was opened the Polish–Japanese Academy of Information Technology.

== Overview ==
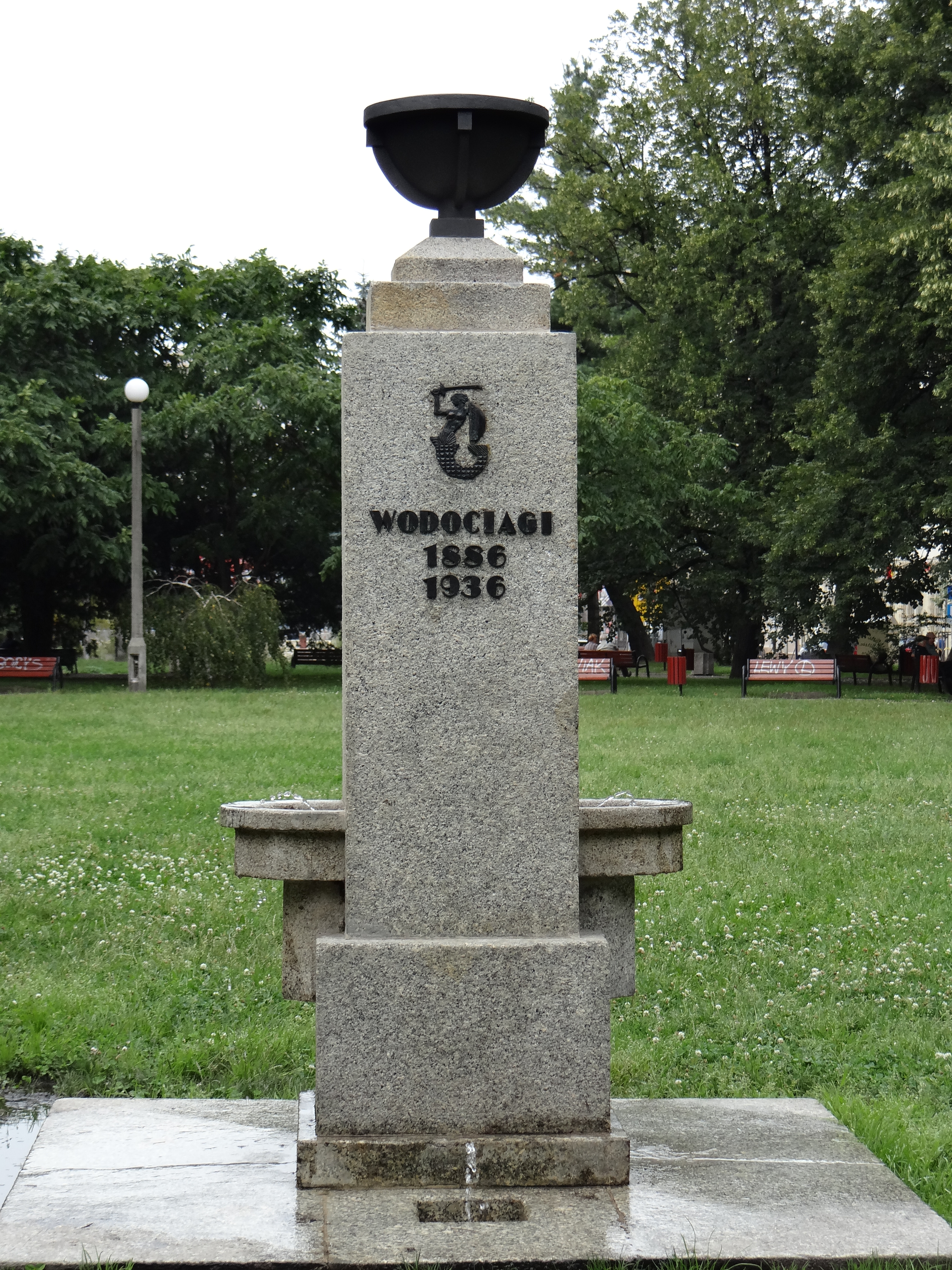
The historic water well.

The Starynkiewicz Square, with the shape of a triangle, is placed between Jerusalem Avenue to the north, Koszyki Street to the east, Lindley and Oczko Streets to the south, and a road to the west, named Starynkiewicz Square. In the north, it is also crossed by Nowy Gród Street. Its large portion is formed by a park, or an urban square, named the Alfons Grotowski Square. The exact boundaries between the two are not clear. On some city-issued maps, Starynkiewicz Square is market to end to the north of Nowy Gród Street, with the rest being Grotowski Square, though the buildings attached to the road making it western boundary have address numbers assigned to Starynkiewicz Square as well. It has an area of around 2 ha.

The garden square is dominated with linden trees, with other species present there beings spruces yews, horse chestnuts, black locust, and European beech. There are also placed a historic water well, and a monument, in form of a commemorative rock, celebrating the 50th anniversary of the nearby Lindley Filters, as well as the park's namesake, Alfons Grotowski, a 19th-century engineer and co-creator of the city's waterworks and sewage system. Additionally, at the corner of Lindley and Nowy Gród Streets stands a sandstone obelisk, dating to 1799, which was moved there from the cemetery next to the former building of the Child Jesus Hospital, now Warsaw Insurgents Square, dedicated to over 30,000 people whom were buried there. At the intersection of Lindley and Koszyki Streets is also placed a monument, in a form of a commemorative rock with an inscription, dedicated to 107 workers from Yugoslavia whom worked on the reconstruction of Warsaw after the Second World War, and whom in 1946, had their departing party hosted at the square.

To the east, the square borders the Child Jesus Teaching Hospital and the Child Jesus Church, to the south, the Lindley Filters, including its historic water tower, and to the west, the Department of Obstetrics and Gynecology of the Medical University of Warsaw, the Polish–Japanese Academy of Information Technology. and the headquarters building of the Municipal Waterworks and Sewage Company of the Capital City of Warsaw. At its northern end, it is also surrounded by apparent buildings.

== Gallery ==
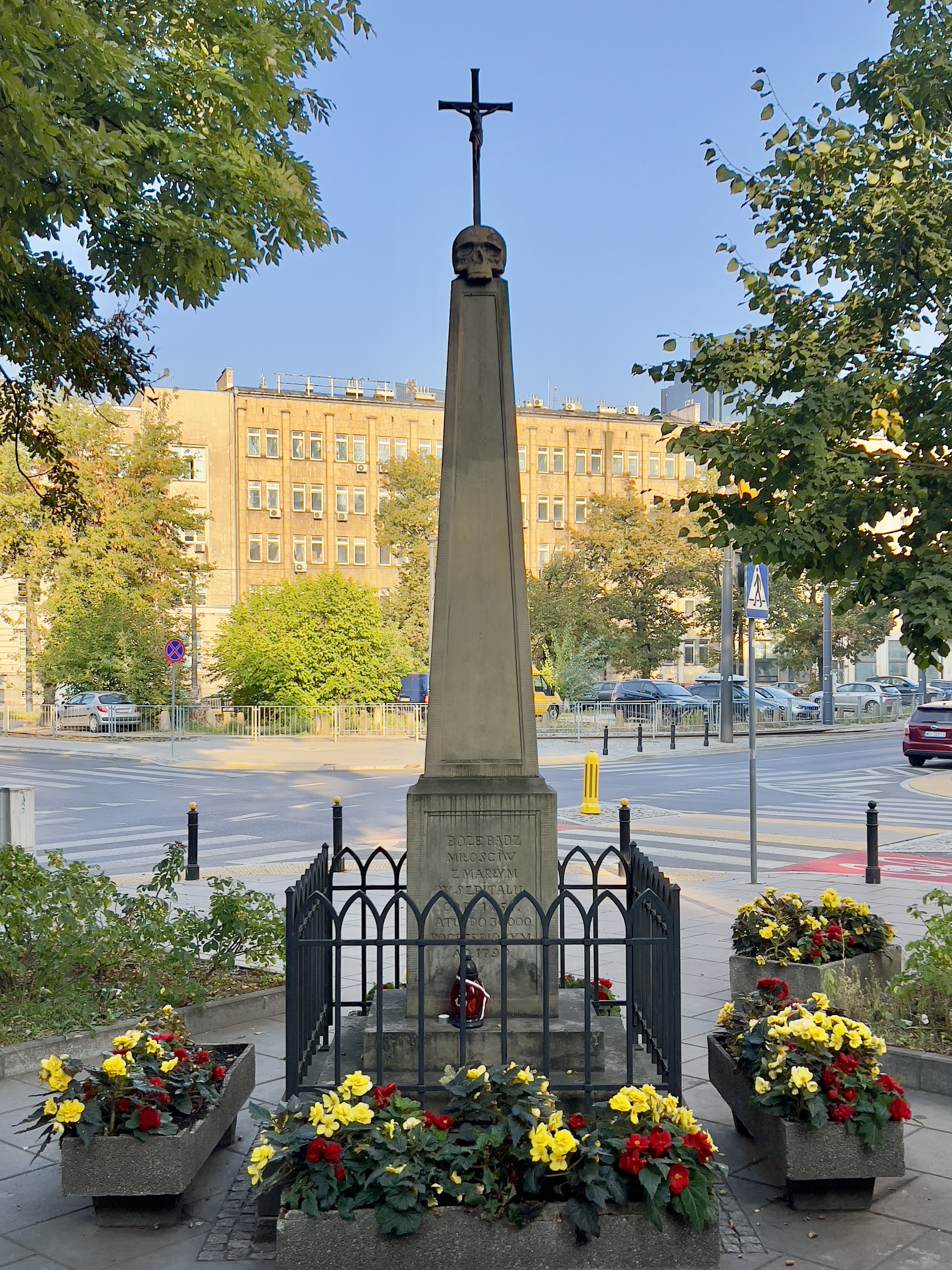
The obelisk at Lidnley Street.

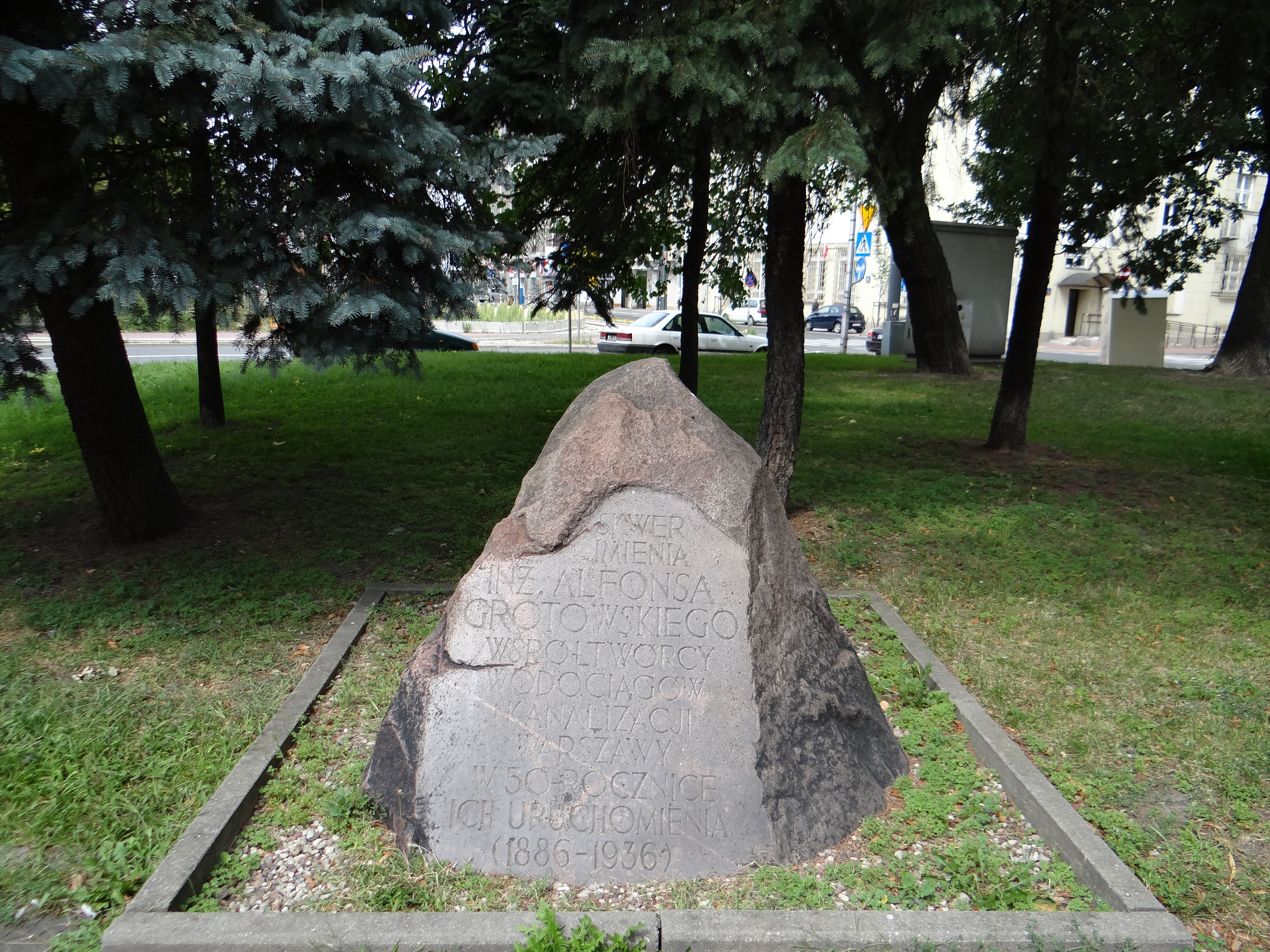
A monument dedicated to Alfons Grotowski.

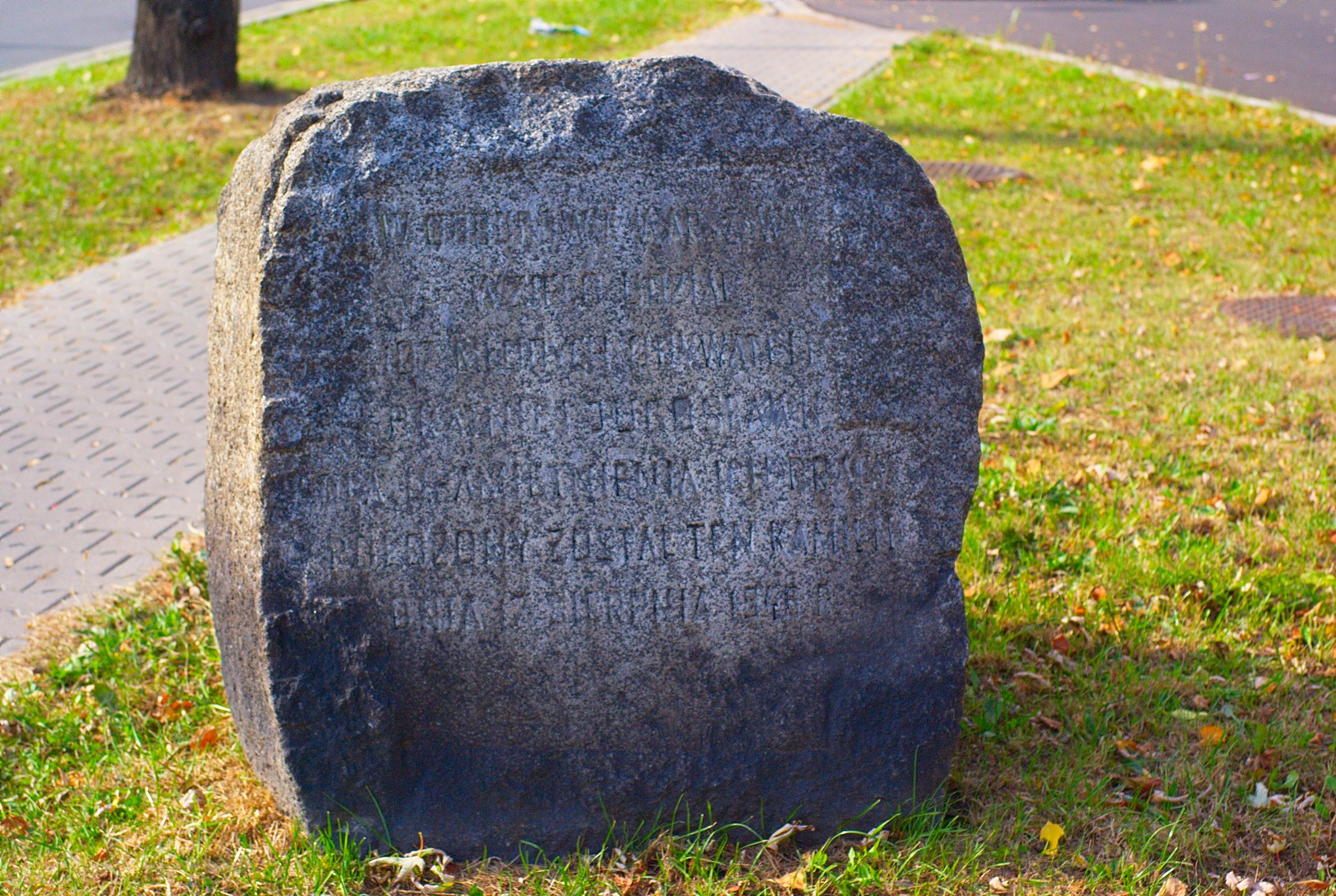
A monument dedicated to the Yugoslaw workers who helped rebuilt Warsaw after the Second World War.

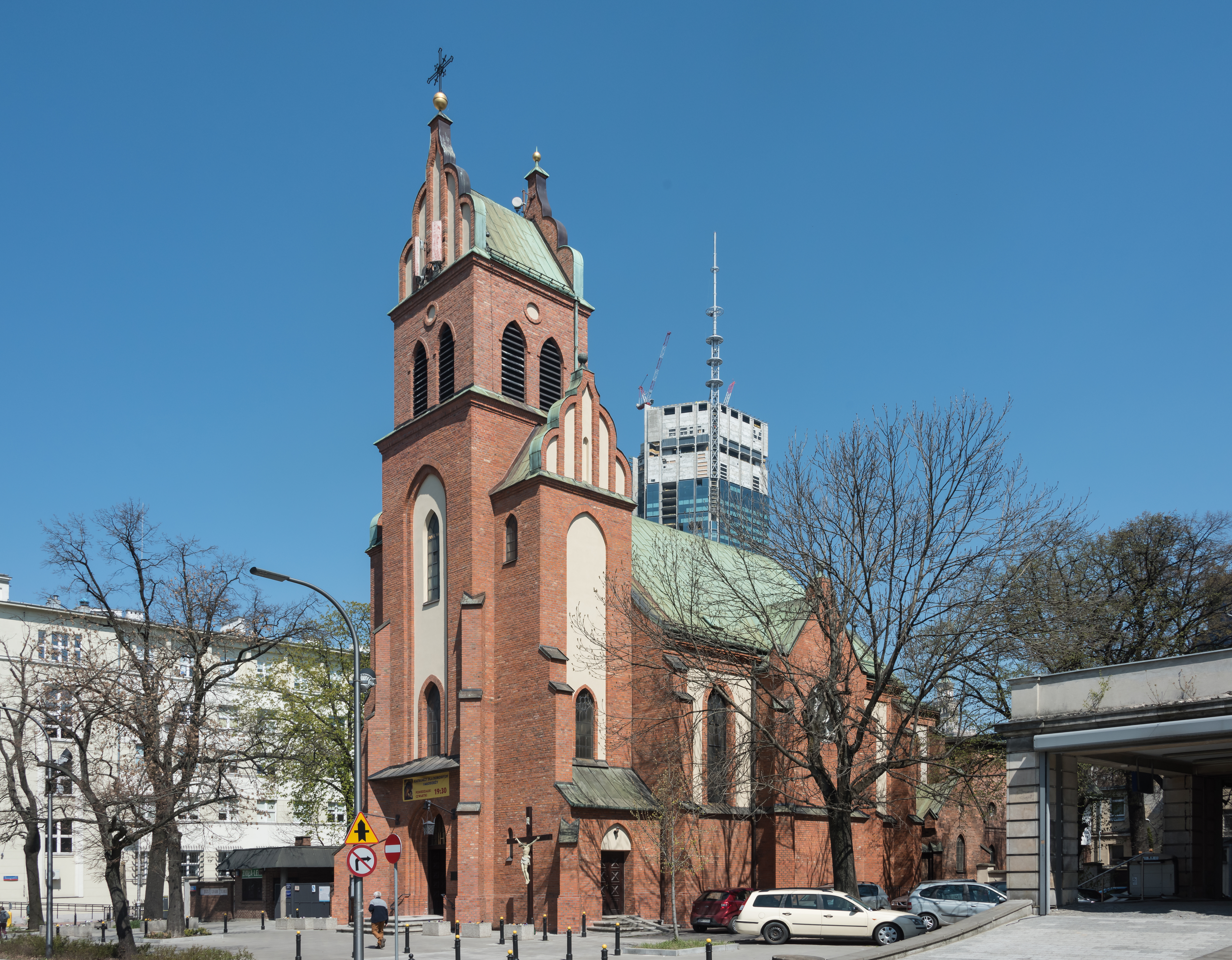
The Child Jesus Church.

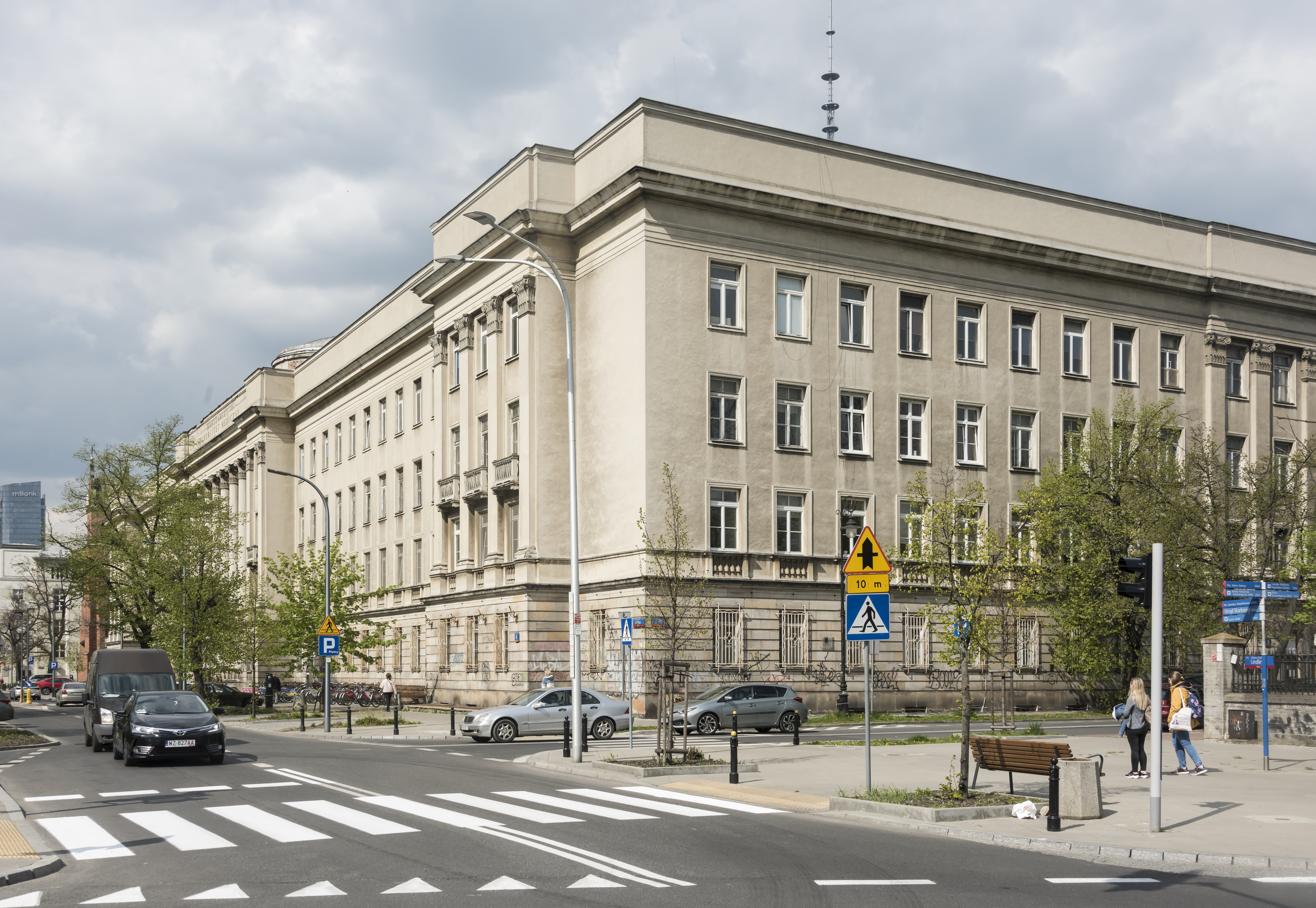
The Child Jesus Teaching Hospital.

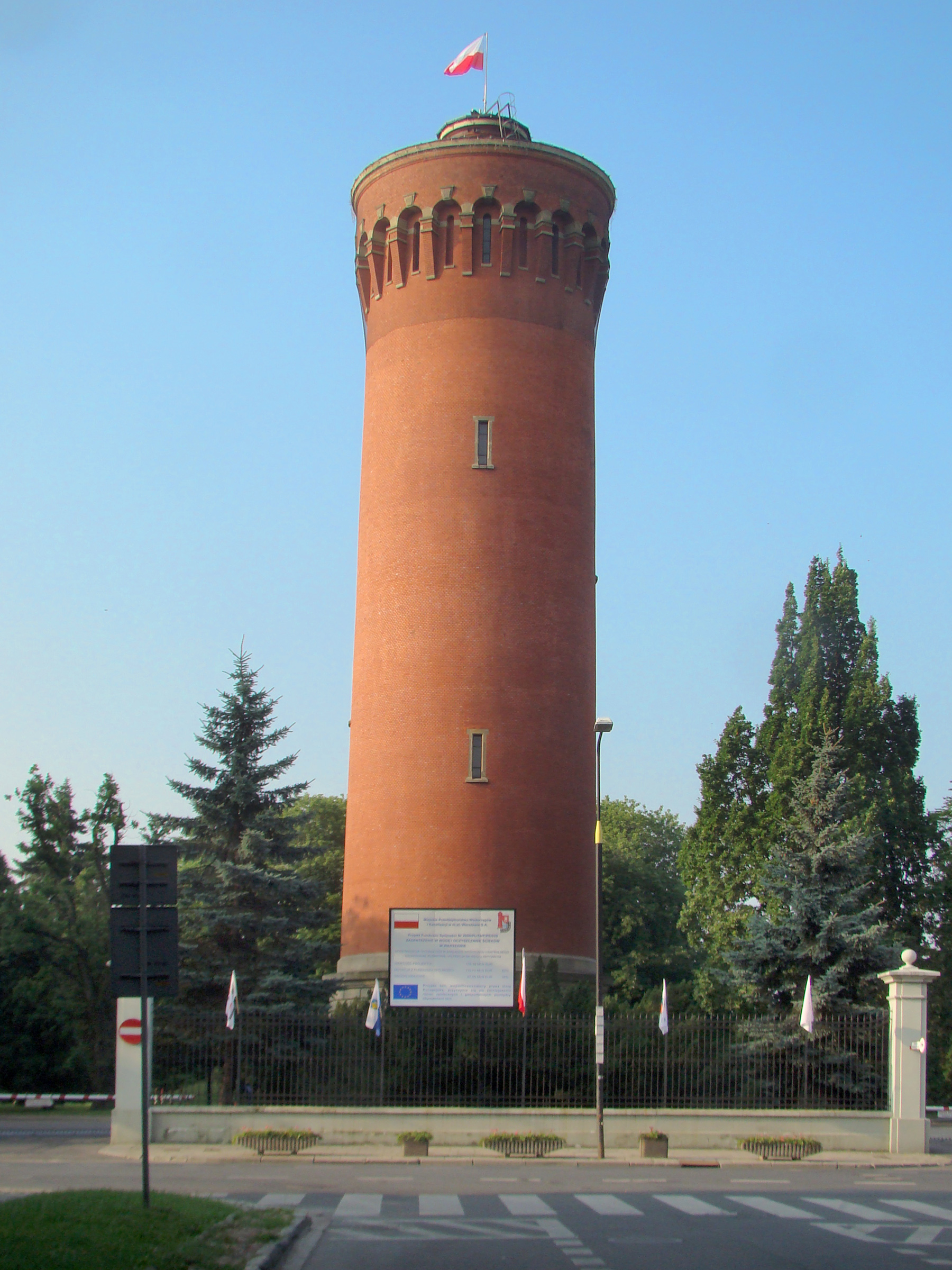
A watertower of the Lindley Filters.

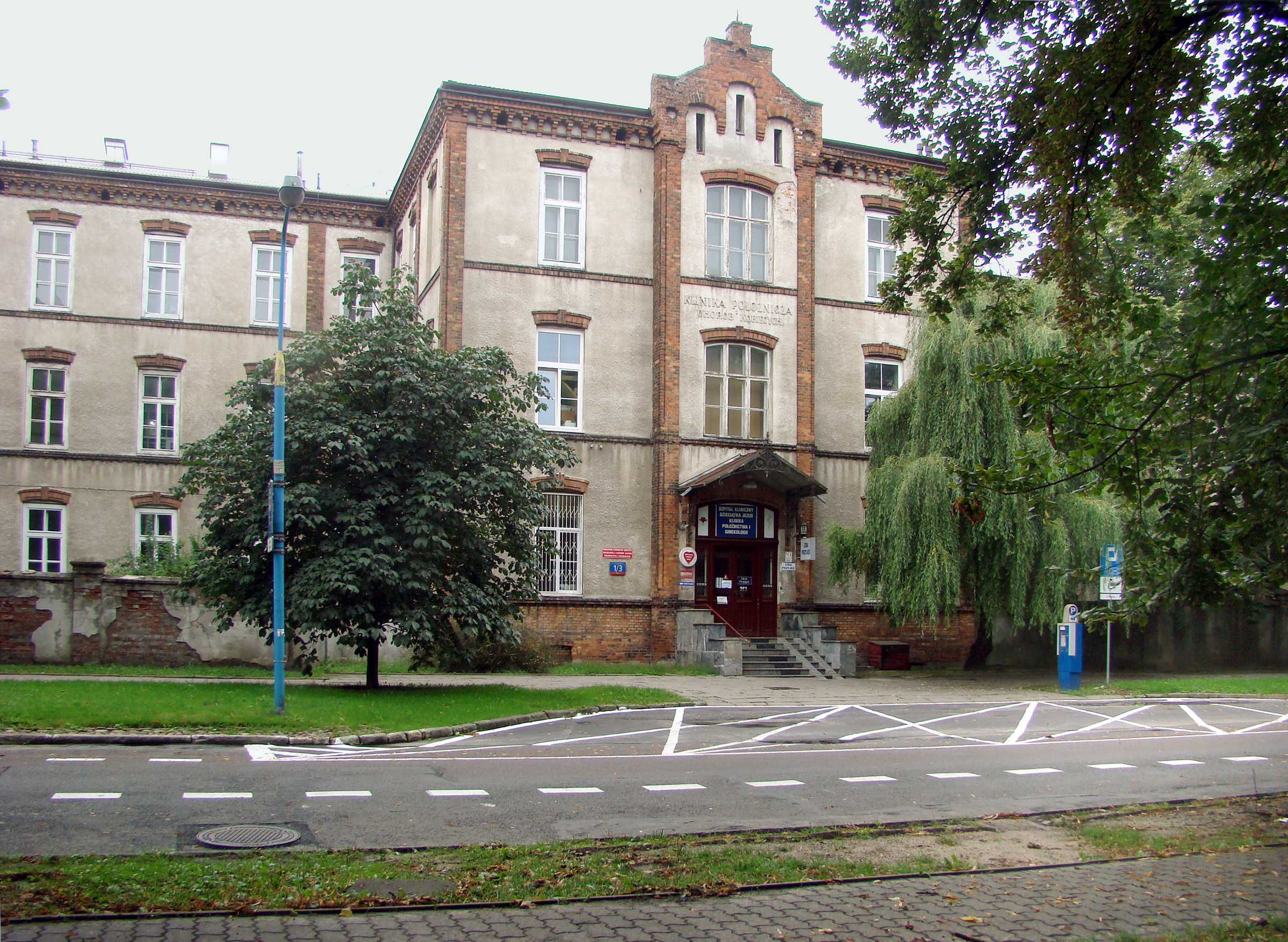
The Department of Obstetrics and Gynecology of the Medical University of Warsaw.

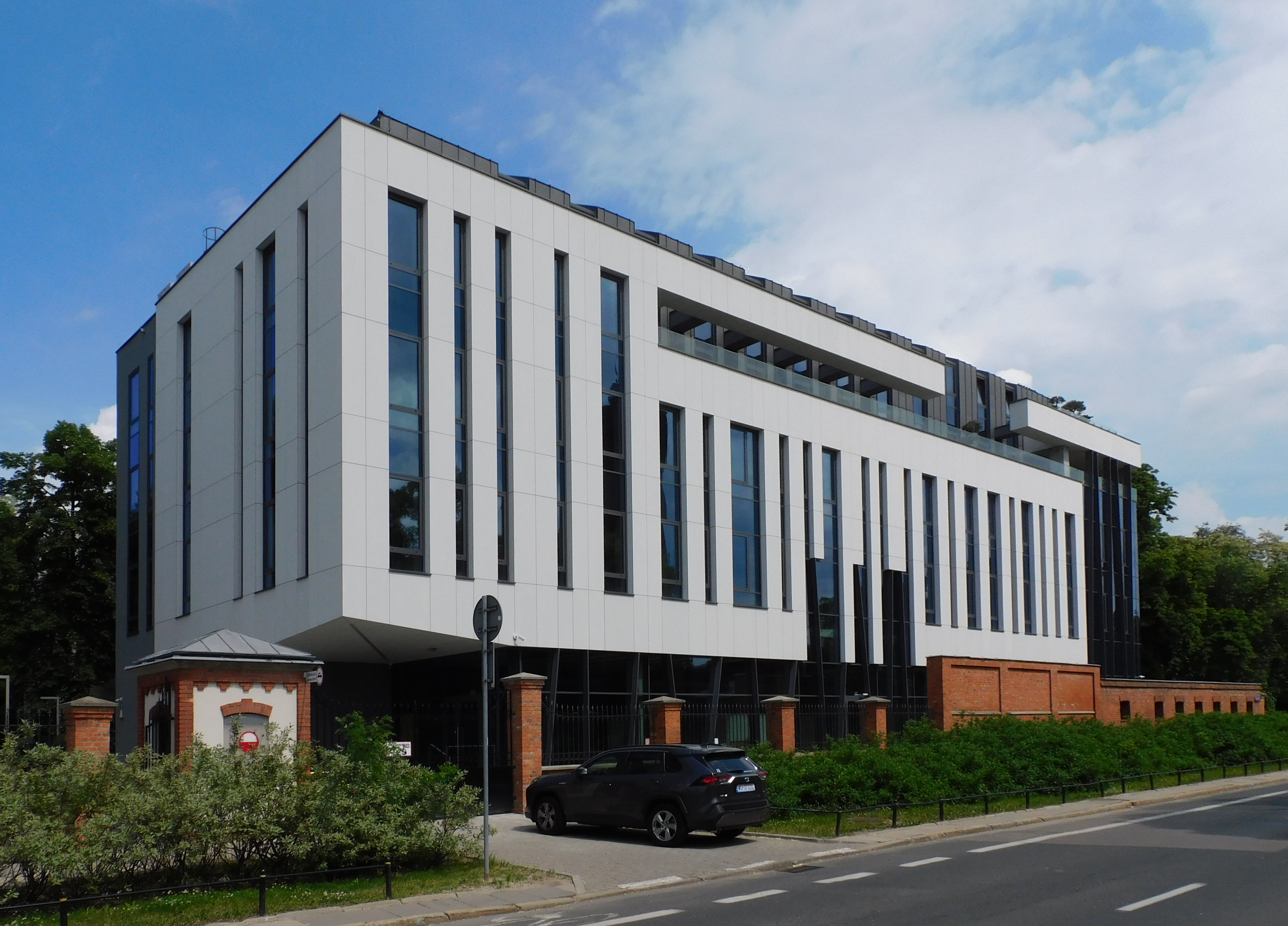
One of the buildings at the campus of Polish–Japanese Academy of Information Technology.

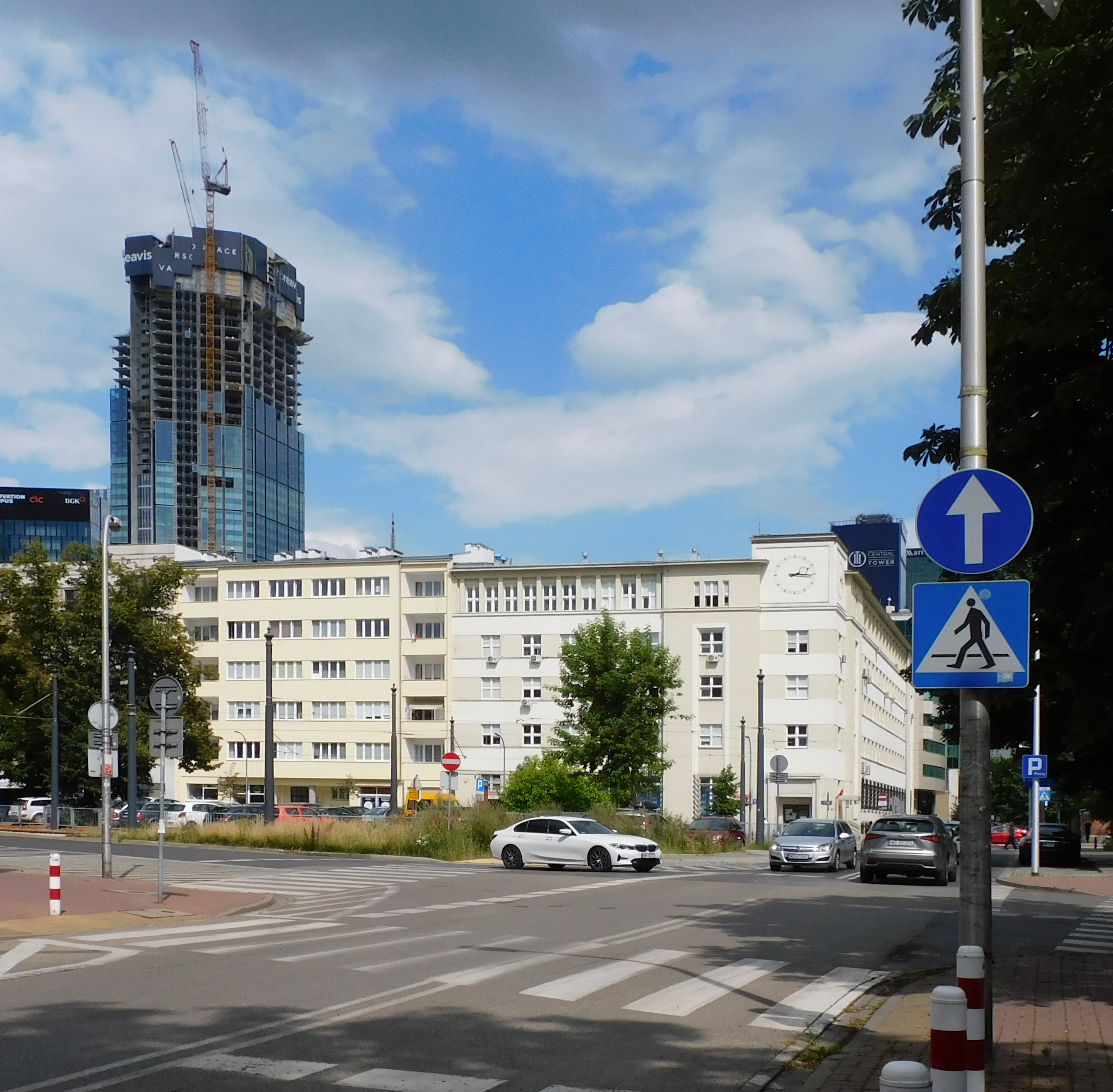
Apartment buildings next to the square.

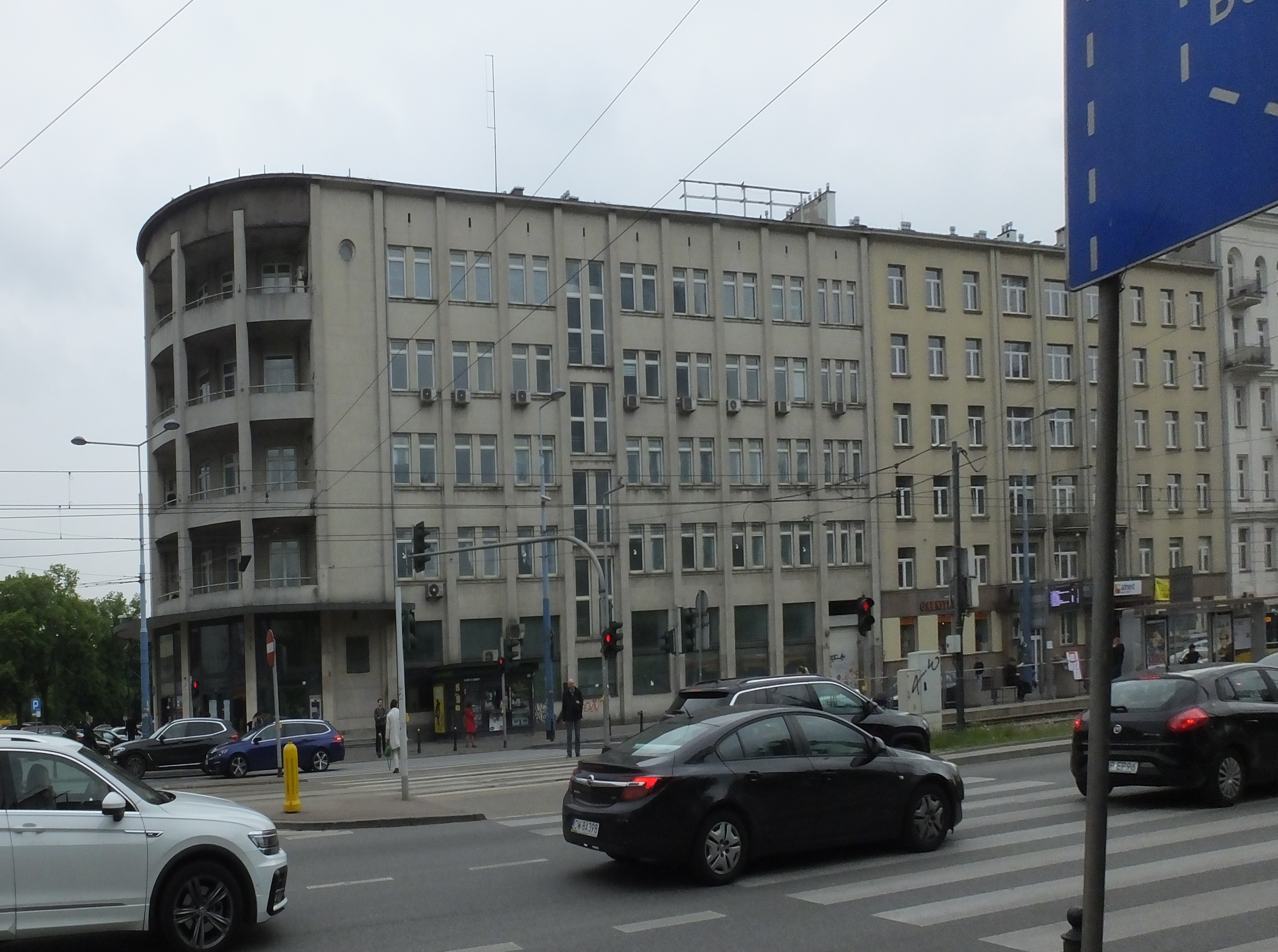
The former Turist House.
