= Sokrates Starynkiewicz Memorial =

Monument in Warsaw, Poland

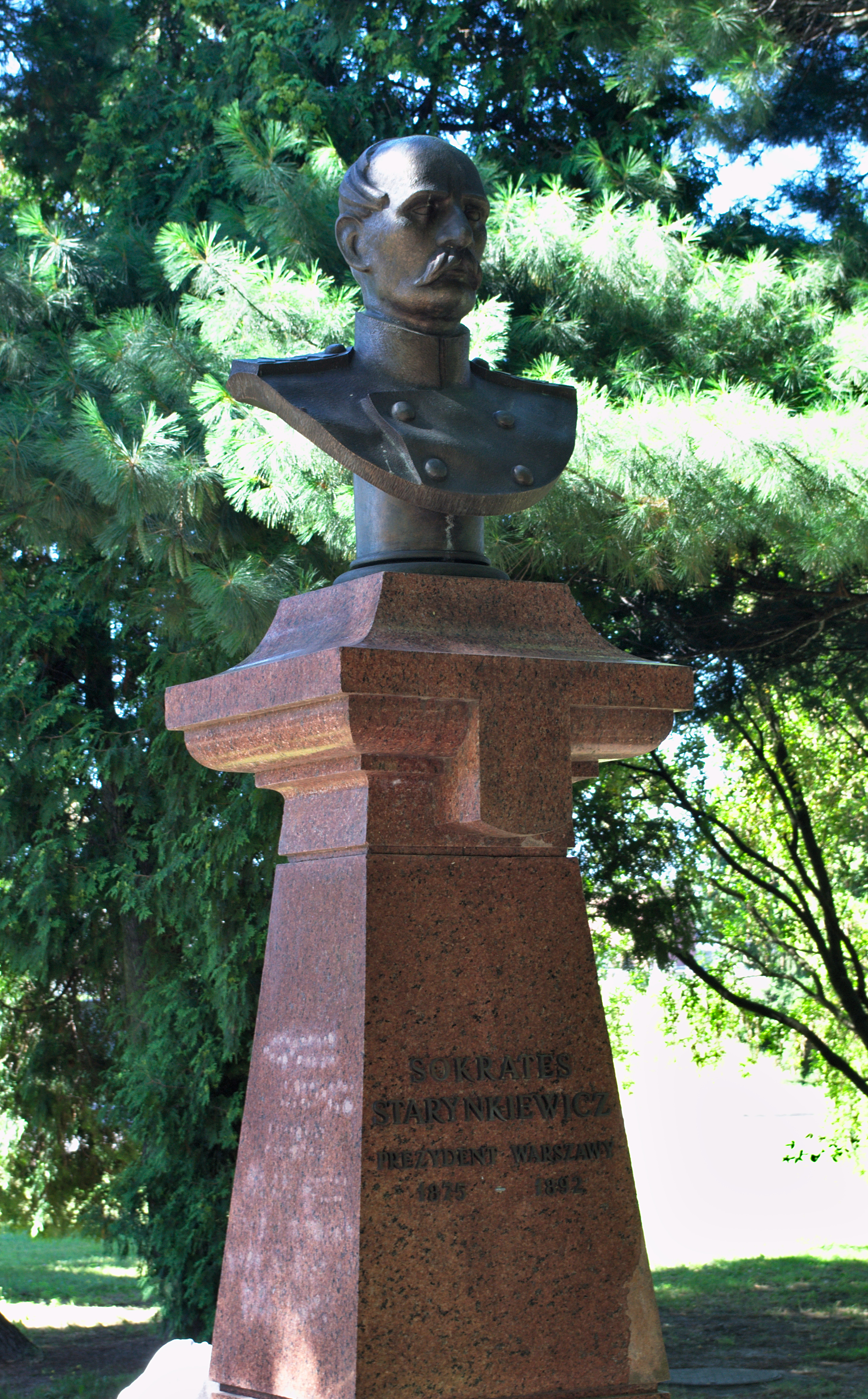
- The bust of Starynkiewicz in 2013.
- Interactive map of Sokrates Starynkiewicz Memorial
- Location: Warsaw Water Filters, Ochota, Warsaw, Poland
- Coordinates: 52°13′22.1″N 20°59′43.8″E
- Designer: Jan Woydyga (original); K. Michalski (replica)
- Type: Bust
- Height: 3 m (9.8 ft)
- Opening date: 1907
- Restored date: 1996
- Dedicated to: Sokrates Starynkiewicz
- Dismantled date: 1944

The Sokrates Starynkiewicz Memorial (Polish: Pomnik Sokratesa Starynkiewicza) is a monument in Warsaw, Poland, located in the district of Ochota, in the Water Filters complex, near 81 Koszykowa Street. It consists of a bust depicting Sokrates Starynkiewicz, a 19th-century military officer and statesman, who was the mayor of Warsaw from 1875 to 1892. It was originally designed by Jan Woydyga, and unveiled in 1907. It was destroyed in 1944 during the Second World War, and its replica was unveiled in 1996.

== History ==
The monument was proposed in 1903 by the inhabitants of Warsaw. It was designed by sculptor Jan Woydyga, and unveiled in 1907, at the Warsaw Water Filters, which were opened while he was in office of the city mayor. The bust was destroyed by German soldiers in 1944 during the Warsaw Uprising in the Second World War. Its replica, designed by K. Michalski, was unveiled in 1996, and placed on the original pedestal.

== Characteristics ==
The monument is placed next to the north side of the water tower, in the Warsaw Water Filters complex, near 81 Koszykowa Street. It consists of a bust of Sokrates Starynkiewicz, placed on a pedestal made from pink granite. Its base is decorated with a sculpture of laurel wreath wrapped around it, which is made from brass. It has the total height of 3 m.

== Gallery ==
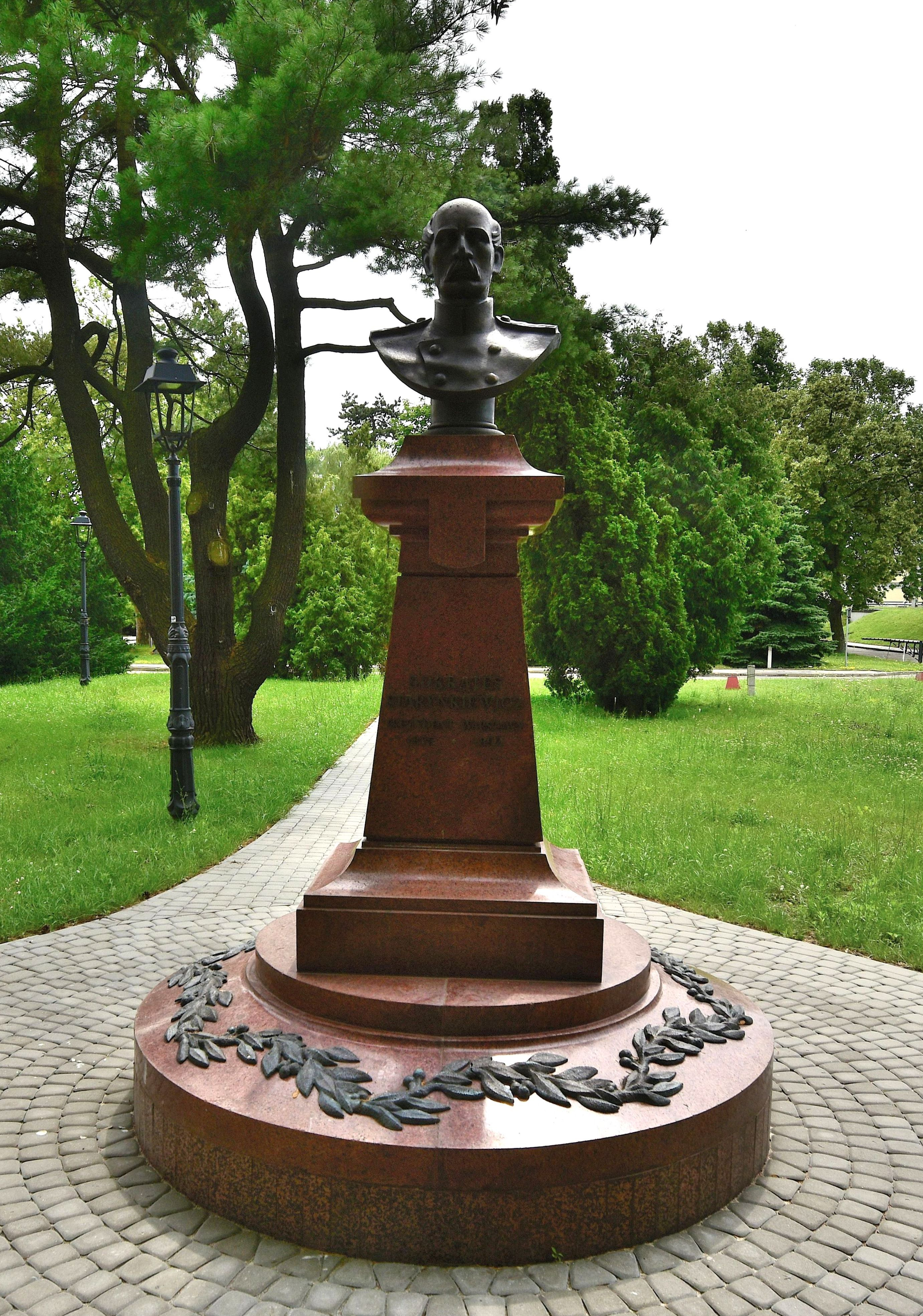
The monument, including its pedestal, in 2017.
