= Alfons Grotowski =

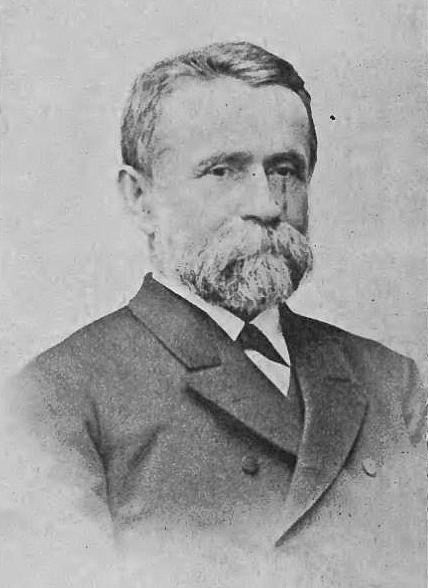
- Grotowski before 1906
- Born: 23 February 1833; Żarnowiec, Kingdom of Poland, Russian Empire
- Died: 18 September 1922 (aged 89); Warsaw, Poland
- Burial place: Powązki Cemetery, Warsaw, Poland
- Occupation: Sanitary engineer

Alfons Grotowski (Polish: [ˈal.fɔns ɡrɔˈtɔf.ski]; 23 February 1833 – 18 September 1922) was a Polish sanitary engineer, who co-designed the waterworks and sewage network of the city of Warsaw, Poland.

== History ==
Alfons Grotowski was born on 23 February 1833 in the village of Żarnowiec, a village, then located in the Kingdom of Poland, within the Russian Empire, and now forming a part of Silesian Voivodeship, Poland.

He graduated from the Higher Real School in Kielce, Poland (now the 1st General Education High School). From 1850, he worked for the Warsaw Transit Administration, and in 1868, he designed the waterworks network in Praga, an area of the city of Warsaw, which operated from 1869 to 1892.

Grotowski led the committee, which in 1874, hired William Lindley to design and manage the construction of the waterworks and sewage network of Warsaw. From 1887 to 1889, he was the senior engineer of the city, and from 1881 to 1889, he was a member of the Sewage and Waterworks Construction Committee, which oversaw the development of the aforementioned network. Later, he became an assistant of William Heerlein Lindley, overseeing and reporting to him on the construction of the waterworks and sewage network.

In 1897, Grotowski was one the co-founders of the Warsaw Hygienist Society. He was also a member of the Society for the Support of Russian Industry and Trade, and the Association of Technicians. Together with architect Józef Orłowski, he designed a fountain, which was unveiled in 1866 on Kraków Suburb Street. Following several relocations, it currently stands in front of the Muranów Cinema at 5 Anders Street.

In 1906, Grotowski survived an assassination attempt on his life in Warsaw, sustaining a head injury from gunfire. He died on 18 September 1922 in Warsaw at the age of 89, and was buried at the Powązki Cemetery within the city.

== Legacy ==
In 1936, to celebrate the 50th anniversary of the opening of the Lindley Filters, a garden square named after Grotowski, was opened at the nearby Starynkiewicz Square.
