= Małgorzata Adamkiewicz =

Polish physician, medical doctor and billionaire entrepreneur

- Born: December 25, 1966 (age 59)
- Citizenship: Poland
- Education: Medical University of Warsaw (MD)
- Occupations: physician, businesswoman
- Known for: Adamed, pharma company

Małgorzata Adamkiewicz (born 1966) is a Polish billionaire businesswoman and philanthropist. She is a medical doctor and has a PhD in endocrinology.

She is the co-owner and president of the supervisory board of the pharmaceutical company Adamed Pharma, the founder of the Adamed Foundation, and the vice chair of the Polish Business Roundtable. She won the Poland Ernst & Young Entrepreneur of the Year Award for the year 2024.

For over two decades, Forbes has ranked her as one of the leading Polish business leaders.

== Early life ==
She graduated with a medical degree from the Medical University of Warsaw, specializing in internal medicine and endocrinology. She worked in the Endocrinology Clinic of the Medical Postgraduate Training Centre at the Bielanski Hospital in Warsaw. During that time, in 2000, she completed a PhD in endocrinology ("Coronary Artherosclerosis and Androgens Concentration in Men").

== Career ==
Since 1986, she has been involved in the operations of Adamed, the pharmaceutical company started by her father-in-law Marian Adamkiewicz. In 2000, she and her husband, Maciej Adamkiewicz, assumed control of the company, with Małgorzata becoming the General Director. Over the next two decades, she expanded the company significantly, making Adamed one of the largest family companies in Poland according to Forbes.

Since 2015, she has been the Vice Chair of the Polish Business Roundtable, Poland's leading business organization originated by Zbigniew Brzezinski. She served on the University Council of the Medical University of Warsaw, was a member of the Business Chapter at Jagiellonian University and the Endocrine Society, and sat on the supervisory board of Poland's second-largest bank, PEKAO S.A.

She sits on the supervisory boards of MCI Capital and the Polish Pharmaceutical Industry Employers' Association (PZPPF).

=== Philanthropy ===
In 2014, she founded the Adamed Foundation, which supports high-achieving high school students interested in STEM. She serves as the foundation's chairperson.

== Selected awards ==
In 2013, President of Poland Bronislaw Komorowski awarded her the Gold Cross of Merit.

In 2019, she was awarded the Medal of the Centenary of Regained Independence (pol. Medal 100-lecia Odzyskania Niepodległości).

In 2025 she won the Polish edition of the Ernst & Young Entrepreneur of the Year Award for the year 2024. Apart from the main award, she has also won the "Production and services" subcategory.
