= Jan Nielubowicz =

Polish surgeon (1915–2000)

- Born: 28 October 1915; Warsaw, Poland
- Died: 2 February 2000 (aged 84); Warsaw, Poland
- Occupation: Surgeon

Jan Nielubowicz (28 October 1915 – 2 February 2000) was a Polish surgeon, regarded (Note: As referenced on the commemorative plaque in the Clinic of General, Vascular and Transplant Surgery at the Medical University of Warsaw) as one of the founders of modern Polish surgery and a pioneer of transplantology and vascular surgery. He conducted the first successful kidney transplantation surgery in Poland.

== Early life ==
Jan Nielubowicz was born into a medical family. His father, Kazimierz Nielubowicz, was a surgeon and urologist in Warsaw, and his grandfather, Władysław Nielubowicz, was a surgeon and director of a hospital in Kremenchuk, Ukraine.

Nielubowicz attended the Stefan Batory Gymnasium in Warsaw. His father died in 1929 when he was just 12, after which his mother, Wanda, decided to move to Vilnius. There he graduated from high school and began his medical studies at Vilnius University. In 1936 he returned to Warsaw and continued his studies at the University of Warsaw, graduating in 1939.

== Career ==
During the war, he worked as a doctor in the Vilnius Region. He returned to Warsaw in 1945 and started working as an assistant at the Surgical Clinic and finishing his studies. He obtained his doctoral degree in 1947. In 1962 he was awarded the title of associate professor and full professor in 1970.

From 1957, while working at the Medical University of Warsaw, he was the head of the Department of Experimental Surgery of the Polish Academy of Sciences. From 1969 he was a correspondent member of the Polish Academy of Sciences, and a full member from 1983. From 1981 to 1986, he was the rector of the Medical University of Warsaw.

He undertook many internships abroad to learn about international scientific developments. In 1956, he undertook a two-month internship at the Leriche Surgical Clinic in Strasbourg, France, in, 1963 he stayed at a month-long internship at the Institute of Heart Surgery and Vessels in Moscow, and in 1967 he spent three months at the Surgical Clinic of the University of London at the Hammersmith Hospital. The most influential was a year-long stipend he received in 1958 from the Rockefeller Foundation at the Surgical Clinic of Harvard University in Boston, USA. The opportunity to travel and undertake internships outside of Poland was crucial for his professional development.

Upon his return from Harvard, he established a school of research-based modern surgery. It opened up prospects for the development of many new areas of specialised surgery. In the field of vascular surgery, he performed over 3,000 operations on aneurysms of the abdominal aorta, peripheral arteries, renal arteries with his own modification of aorto-renal transplant. He introduced his own, original method of lymph node anastomosis in the treatment of lymphedema of the extremities. He uses an innovative, extracorporeal liver perfusion by the pig's liver in the treatment of acute liver failure. He introduced the operational production of the portal-systemic anastomoses, performing over 300 such operations. In endocrinological surgery, he initiated parathyroid surgeries, and personally carried out 150 surgeries to remove the adrenal glands. He applied pioneering methods in the surgeries of acute diseases of the abdominal cavity, the esophagus, stomach, pancreas, bile ducts, and kidneys.

Together with Tadeusz Orłowski, Nielubowicz initiated the transplant program in Poland and in 1966, successfully transplanted a kidney in a patient on chronic dialysis. This success was followed by establishment of the Transplantation Institute of the Warsaw Medical Academy in 1975, which facilitated the scientific and clinical growth of nephrology and transplantation in Poland.

== Kidney transplantation ==
On January 26, 1966, the first successful cadaveric kidney transplantation in Poland was conducted by Nielubowicz. The surgical team had been preparing to start the clinical transplantation program for over two years, practicing the surgery on dogs. Experiments were designed to demonstrate the signs and symptoms of acute kidney allograft rejection, and to investigate the influence of several drugs used for its treatment.

The recipient, an 18-year-old nursing school student, had been prepared for surgery and taken care afterwards in the Department of Medicine by nephrologist Tadeusz Orłowski and his team. The operation started at 5:00 PM and lasted only 57 minutes. In the span of a few minutes, the implanted kidney started functioning and the surgery was celebrated as successful. The patient died half a year later, on July 16, 1966, despite her kidneys still working properly. The cause of death was acute pancreatic necrosis, possibly caused by the use of steroid drugs to prevent renal rejection. The same year, Nielubowicz alongside Tadeusz Orłowski performed two more kidney transplants. The first of the patients lived with the new organ for two years, and the second - four.

== Legacy ==
Nielubowicz is regarded as the founder of modern Polish vascular surgery and transplantology. He was referenced as such in 2015, on the celebration of the 100th anniversary of his birth by the Clinic of General, Vascular and Transplant Surgery at the Medical University of Warsaw. The date of the first kidney transplantation surgery in Poland, 26 January, is celebrated as Transplantology Day.

In 2018 a street in Warsaw was named after him.

Nielubowicz is buried at the Powązki Cemetery in Warsaw.
