= Medical University of Warsaw =

Medical school in Poland

Coordinates: 52.2059°N 20.9856°E

- Warszawski Uniwersytet Medyczny
- Latin: Universitas Medica Varsoviensis
- Other names: WUM, MUW
- Former names: Medical Academy of Warsaw (1809–1816, 1950–2008); Medico-Chirurgical Academy (1857–1862); Doctoral Academy of Warsaw (Jan–Mar 1950)
- Motto: Saluti Publicae
- Motto in English: Public Safety
- Type: Public research university
- Established: 1809; 214 years ago
- Founders: Wolff, Dziarkowski, Czekierski, Brandt, Celiński
- Accreditation: Polish Accreditation Committee (PKA)
- Academic affiliations: EUA
- Chancellor: Marta Kijak-Bloch
- Rector: Rafał Krenke
- Academic staff: 2,034
- Students: 9,764 (12.2023)
- Postgraduates: 399
- Doctoral students: 270
- Location: Żwirki i Wigury Street 61, Warsaw, 02-091, Poland
- Campus: Urban
- Language: Polish, English
- Colors
- Nickname: AZS Uniwersytetu Medyczny Warszawskiego
- Sporting affiliations: University Sports Association of Poland
- Website: www.wum.edu.pl/en

The Medical University of Warsaw (Polish: Warszawski Uniwersytet Medyczny) is one of the oldest and the largest medical schools in Poland. The first academic department of medicine was established as far back as two centuries ago in 1809. It is considered to be one of the most prestigious and reputable schools nationally for the medical sciences, partly due to its affiliation with a number of large hospitals in Poland.

Originally known as the 'Medical Academy of Warsaw', its creation precedes that of the University of Warsaw, eventually merging as a single school, undergoing a considerable number of changes, before separating into the functionally autonomous university that is still operating today.

At the Medical University of Warsaw, general and specialty training are provided at both undergraduate and postgraduate levels. Students learn at five clinical teaching hospitals which provide general and tertiary medical care to patients. Students and staff also conduct scientific and clinical research at these hospitals in addition to involvement in a number of clinical academic departments located in other hospitals in the city.

WUM currently offers 16 degree programs including 3 full-time degree programs in English: Dentistry, Medicine, and Pharmacy. Among English-taught European schools, these are considered to be particularly well-established (the English Medical programme has been active since 1993).

== Faculties ==
- Faculty of Medicine
- Faculty of Dental Medicine
- Faculty of Medical Sciences
- Faculty of Pharmacy
- Faculty of Health Sciences

== History ==
Much of the history of the university is shared with the University of Warsaw as they were functionally one entity for much of the previous two centuries. During this period, the Medical University of Warsaw was essentially a 'Faculty of Medicine' functioning alongside the larger general University it was associated with.

=== Founding (1807–1815) ===
In 1807, the Governing Commission, finding a serious shortage of doctors within the city, issued an order for the founding of a medical school in Warsaw. This was finally realised on the 18th of September, 1809, upon the issuance of a Royal Decree by Frederick Augustus I of Saxony (then the Duke of Warsaw) at Dresden, founding the Faculty of Medicine. At the time, this faculty would be headed by Hiacynt Dziarkowski and the General Medical Council.

By the 9th of October of the same year, the Chamber of Education would go on to approve the syllabus, timetable, and internal organization of the newly founded school, formally appointing H. Dziarkowski as its Dean. Only a four-years long medical program alongside a two-years chemical and pharmaceutical course would be offered at commencement. On the 1st of December, the Obstetrics Institute was opened in the building located on the Rynek Nowego Miasta.

The final major appointment by the Chamber would be Stanisław Staszic to the post of President of the Academic-Medical Faculty prior to the inauguration finally taking place on the 7th of June, 1810. Within three years, the school presented its first diplomas in an award ceremony to 18 graduates including 6 doctors of medicine and surgery, 4 first grade surgeons, 1 second grade surgeon, 5 chemists, and 2 pharmacists.

=== Royal University of Warsaw (1815–1831) ===
In 1795, the Partitions of Poland had left Warsaw without access to any centres of learning other than the Academy of Vilnius (present day Lithuania) due to Kraków (where the famed Jagiellonian University was located) falling under the Austrian Habsburg monarchy. By 1815, the newly established polity of Congress Poland would find itself without any university at all, as by then Vilnius was well integrated into the Russian Empire.

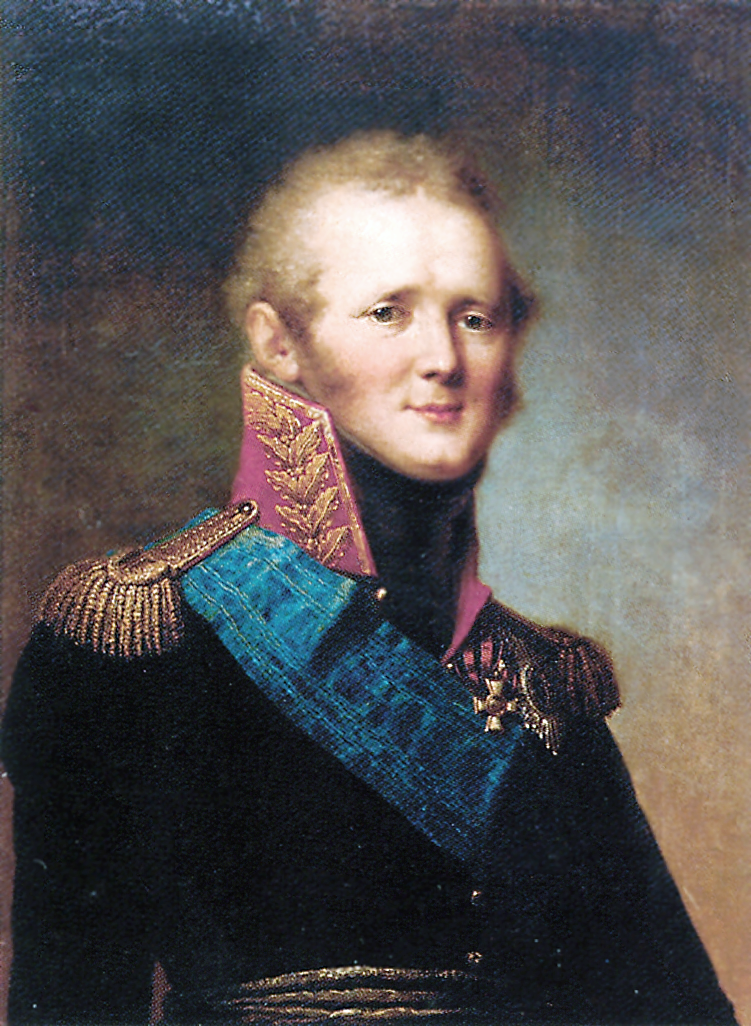
Alexander I, Emperor of Russia. His educational reforms merged the medical faculty with others as one university, later named after him.

Stanisław Kostka Potocki thus submitted a memorandum to the reigning Tsar Alexander I of Russia regarding the foundation of a university inclusive of a Faculty of Medicine. This request was granted on the following year on the 16th of November, 1816, with the Tsar issuing a founding deed permitting the Polish authorities to create the 'Royal University of Warsaw'. It had 5 initial faculties: Theology, Law and Administration, Medicine, Philosophy, Sciences and Fine Arts. This was done by the combination of the already existing schools in Warsaw ‒ the Academic-Medical Faculty and the School of Law and Administration. The official opening of the university took place in March 1817. By motion of the Deans, the General Council introduced the name of the newly established institution, the 'Royal University'.

In 1818, the tenement building on Jezuicka Street became the seat of the medical faculty of the Royal University and its constituent departments of: internal medicine, surgery, and obstetrics (the associated institute of which was incorporated to the University on 5 August). Higher and lower grade doctors, midwives, ophthalmologists, dentists, and chemists studied here. The school system underwent significant changes such as that in 1828 where a resolution issued by the Government Commission of Religious Affairs and Public Education discontinued all the aforementioned lower-grade courses. Effective immediately, all candidates now had to submit a Matura certificate and complete a 5-year curriculum.

The name was changed once more on 9 March 1829 to the Alexander's Royal University of Warsaw. Just two years later on 19 November 1831, the university would find itself shut down due to the involvement of student and faculty in the November Uprising. In this 22 years of its existence, 61 students had obtained the degree 'Master of Medicine and Surgery', 30 students would graduate as doctors, 33 students obtained the degree of Surgeon of the First grade and Second grade, and a total of 165 students would obtain the degree of 'Master of Pharmacy'. Poland had lost its autonomy, and Warsaw became nothing more than a military garrison under control by the Russian Empire.

=== Medico–Chirurgical Academy (1857–1862) ===
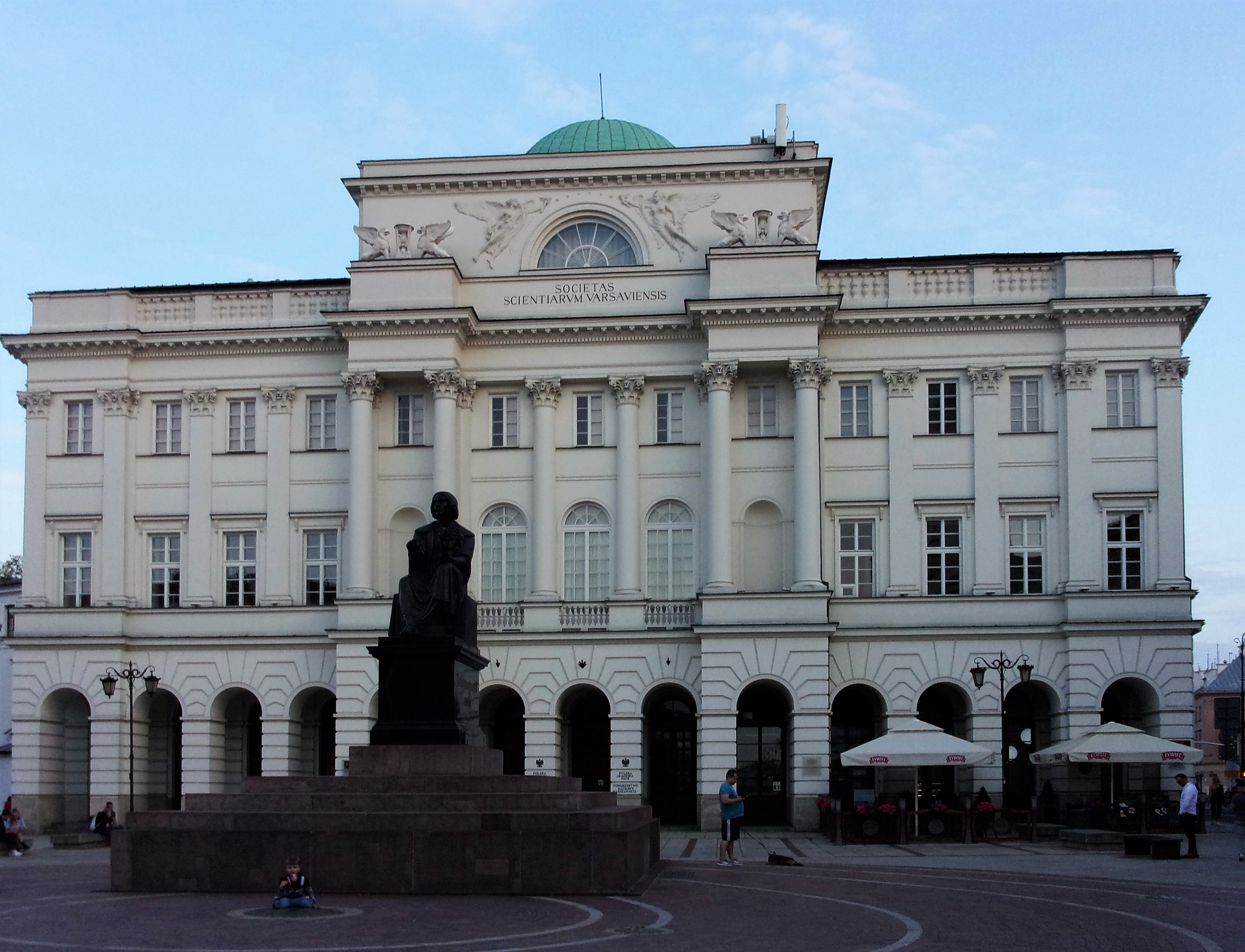
Staszic Palace, where theoretical classes took place. It is now the seat of the Polish Academy of Sciences.

Reopening occurred on the 1st of October, 1857, under the name 'Medico-Chirurgical Academy'. Medicine remained a 5-year degree award while Pharmacy was of 2-years. The academy was also eligible to grant doctoral degrees, and specialist degrees like the one of 'Doctor of Dental Medicine'. From September of next year, theoretical classes moved to the Staszic Palace, while the practical classes took place in a myriad of hospitals including: Infant Jesus, Saint John of God, Ophthalmic Institute, Obstetrics Institute, Ujazdów Hospital, and the Evangelist Hospital. Different departments were divided between each of these hospitals.

In 1861, the Government Commission of Religious Affairs and Public Education was restored, now headed by Aleksander Wielopolski. He would confirm the foundation of the 'Main University of Warsaw' inclusive of four different faculties. These included: Law and Administration, Philosophy and History, Maths and Physics, as well as Medicine, opening on 25 November 1862.

The university would be closed for a second time as a consequence to the failed 1863 January Uprising. Tsar Alexander II requested its transformation to the Imperial University of Warsaw which would replace it.

== Buildings and Sites ==
=== WUM Campuses ===
==== Banach Campus ====
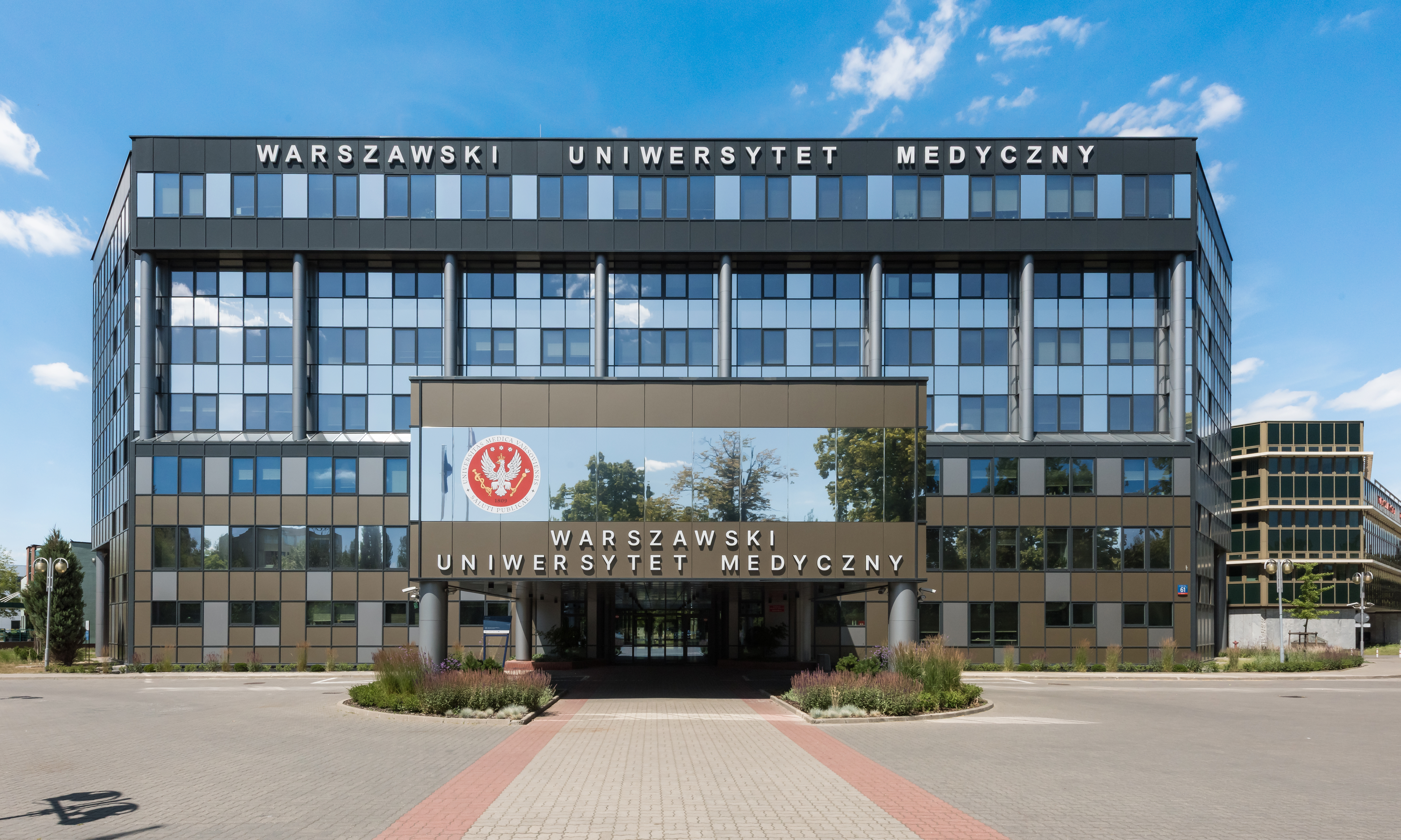
The University's rectorate, on the Banach Campus

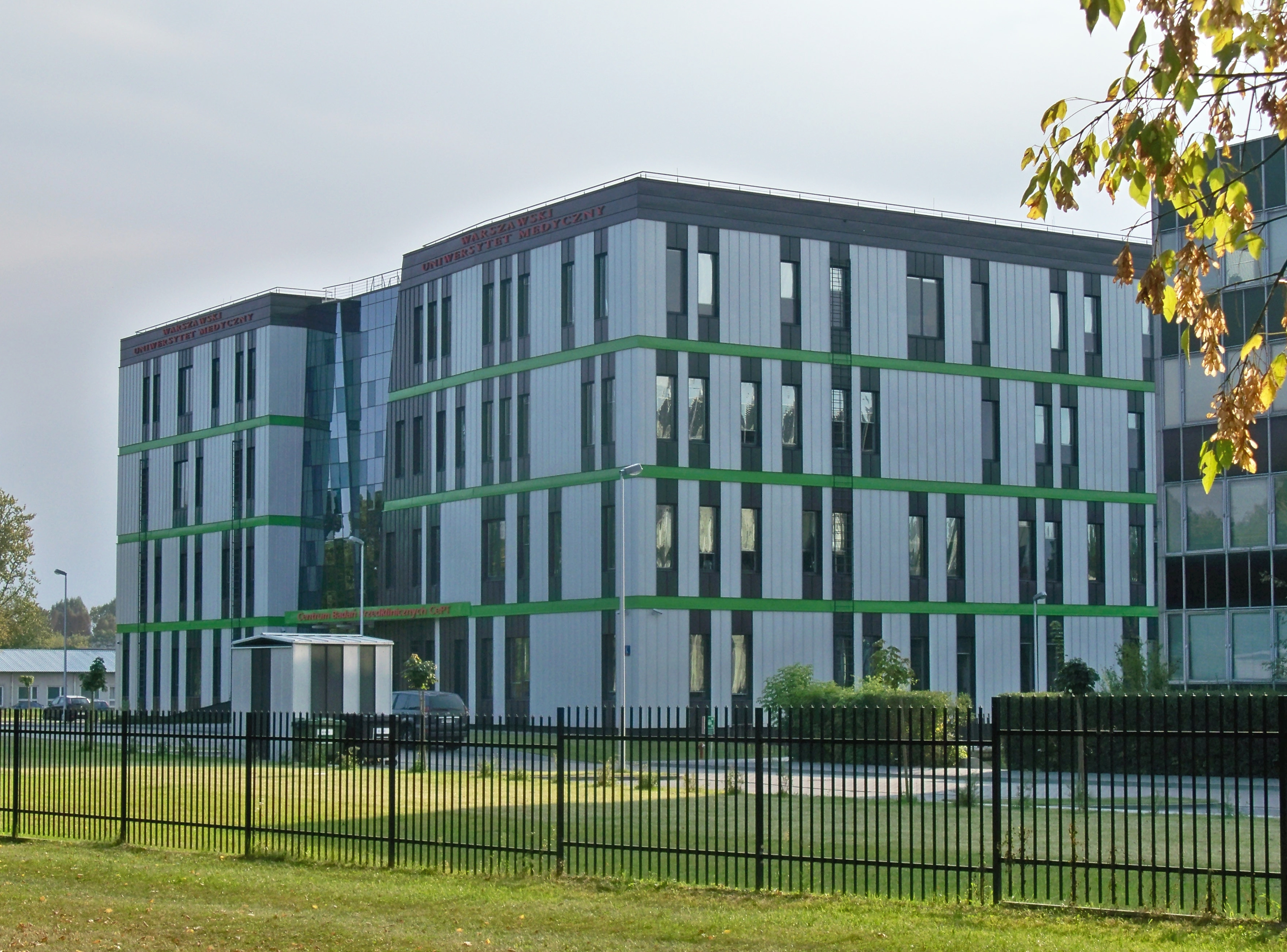
Center for Pre-Clinical Research and Technology

The Banach campus is most commonly associated with the University, being the largest, most modern campus. It is where the Rectorate and school administration are located. The campus is located on a large area between Banacha, Żwirki i Wigury, Księcia Trojdena and Pawińskiego Streets. Additionally, the Centre for Postgraduate Education and the Dean's Offices for the Faculties of Medicine, Dental Medicine, Medical Sciences, and Health Sciences can also be found here.

The Rectorate is connected to Library and Information Center (LIC), a four-story building, as well as the Didactic Center (DC), where the lecture halls and rooms are used for classes. This center also houses the Academic Language Centre, the Student Benefits Section and the Career Office. Other buildings associated with the campus include the Faculty of Pharmacy, Central Clinical Hospital (UCC), Children Clinical Hospital (UCC), University Dental Center (UDC), Medical Simulation Center (CSM), Centre for Pre-clinical Research and Technology (CePT), Sports and Rehabilitation Center (SRC), and the Ronald MacDonald House used by the carers of children staying at the pediatric wards of the aforementioned hospitals. In the future, a 'WUMIK' nursery will also be opened in this building.

==== Lindley Campus ====
The campus is located in the city center of Warsaw, found between the Lindleya, Oczki, Chałubińskiego, and Nowogrodzka streets. Here the historical complex of buildings can be found now known as the "Infant Jesus Hospital (later integrated into the UCC MUW). At the Starynkiewicz Square nearby, the University Centre for Women and Newborn Health is located, with the first Clinic of Gynecology and an associated Obstetrics Simulation Centre. An Anatomical College ("Collegium Anatomicum") built in the 20th century can be found at the eastern end, housing four different departments (Anatomy, Histology, Microbiology, and Biology). The Department of Forensic Medicine is found next door here.

Oczki street is also home to the "Clubhouse of Medics", headquarters of WUM Student Organizations, and one of the more famous Polish Student Clubs. Academic events and student meetings are usually held at this venue. Other buildings located nearby include the didactic units of the Faculty of Health Sciences including the Departments of: Social Medicine, Epidemiology Biostatistics, Pharmaceutical Microbiology, Immunology, and Biochemistry and Nutrition. From the east the Campus is enclosed by the historic building of the Departments of Dermatology at 82a Koszykowa Street.

==== Ciołka Campus ====
Currently the Ciołka campus consists of solely two buildings. The first houses the didactic units of the school's Faculty of Health Sciences including the Departments of: Clinical Dietetics, Human Nutrition, Nursing Development, Social and Medical Sciences, Basic Nursing, and finally Clinical Nursing. The other is a historic building found on the nearby 1 Dalibora Street. It is currently undergoing modernization and reconstruction.

=== University Clinical Center ===
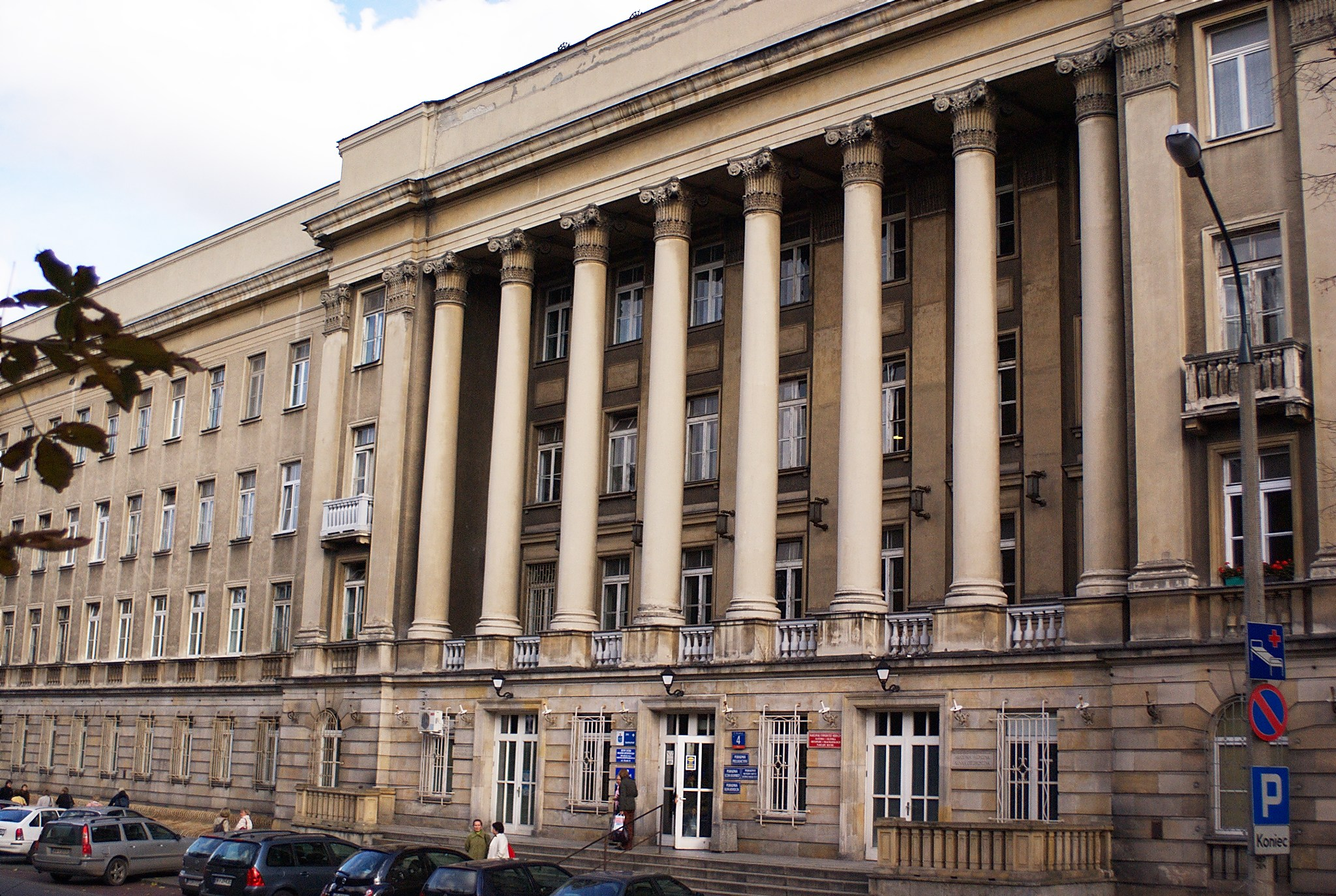
Infant Jesus Clinical Hospital, now merged onto the UCC WUM.

The main Teaching Hospital associated with the university, it was created as a merger of three separate clinical hospitals all sharing the university as the founding body, namely: the Independent Public Central Clinical Hospital, the Józef Polikarp Brudziński Public Pediatric Clinical Hospital, and the Infant Jesus Clinical Hospital. In a Newsweek 2021 Ranking of Best Hospitals, the UCC WUM ranked as the 101–200th Best Hospital in the World, consequently being ranked as the Best Hospital in Poland. Webometrics Ranking of Hospitals 2015 run by Cybermetrics Lab placed the UCC as 14th Best in Poland, 1,625th Best in the World. This ranking has yet to be updated since.

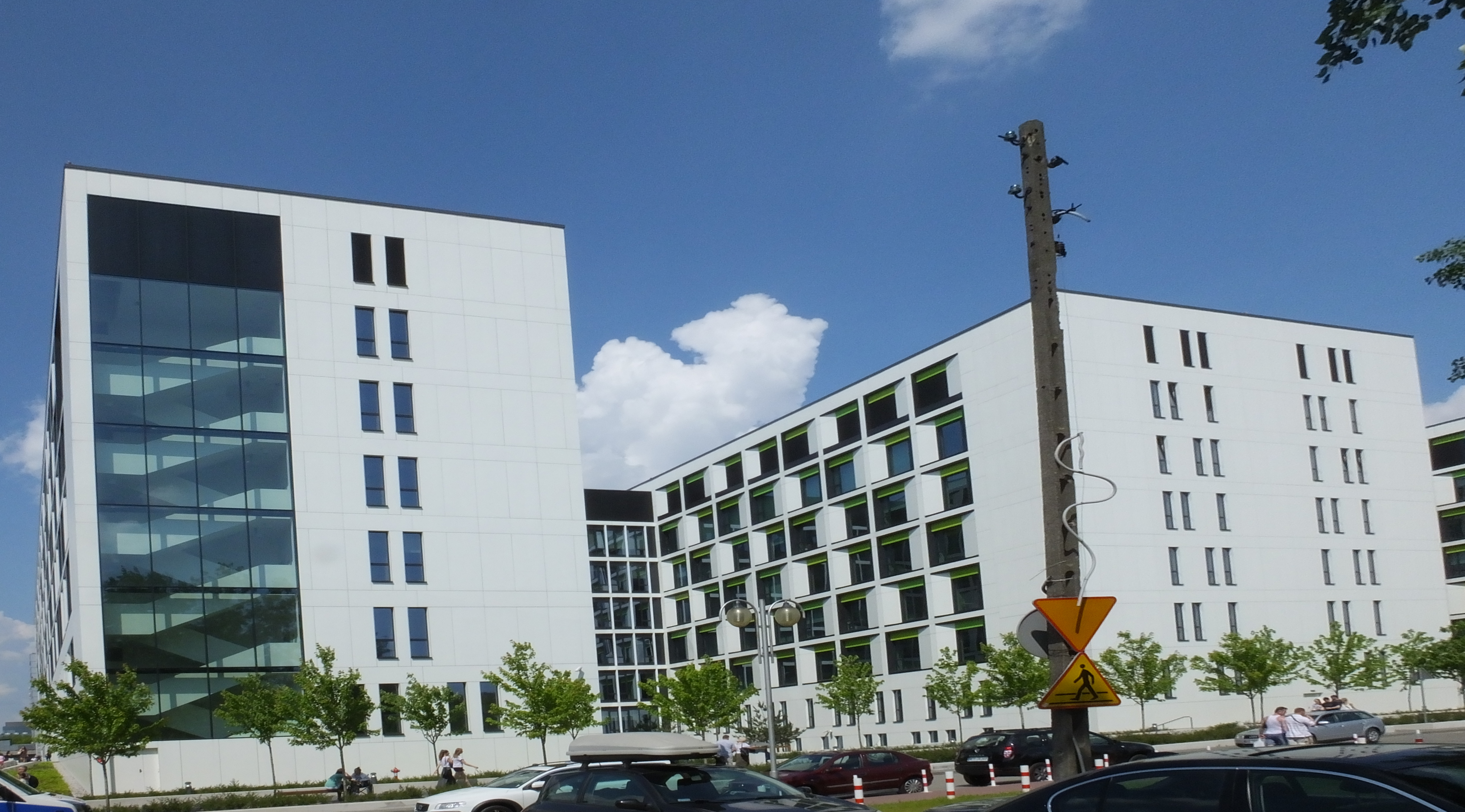
Independent Public Children's Clinical Hospital (Pediatric Hospital of WUM).

=== Duchess Anna Mazowiecka Hospital ===
Specialty hospital catering to mothers and newborns for comprehensive medical care, as well as women of all ages. At present, three departments of the university operate within this hospital: the Second Department of Obstetrics and Gynecology, the Department of Gynecological Endocrinology and the Department of Neonatology with a Neonatal Intensive Care Unit. The hospital is a recipient of many awards, including the certificate of "Outstanding Medical Institution", the Gold Certificate "Reliable in Health Care", the "Mazovian Eagle of Business" and the title of "Woman-Friendly Center".

It has been conferred the title of "Children's Hospital of the Future" by the K.I.D.S Foundation (Children's Hospital Innovators Club). On the 26th of May in 2022, the institution was also officially endowed with the title of "Child-Friendly Hospital". In Poland, this title is awarded by the Committee for the Promotion of Breastfeeding established in 1992 in cooperation with the Ministry of Health and Social Welfare, the Polish Committee of UNICEF, and the Institute of Mother and Child. It is considered a prestigious award, given only to 95 Polish institutions thus far.

In December of the same year, the hospital celebrated its 110 years of history when it first opened at Karowa St. It is listed on the Webometrics Ranking of Hospitals 2015, placing as 32nd Best in Poland and 2801st globally. Additionally Newsweek Best Hospitals 2021 places it as 14th Best within Poland with a score of 76.38%.

=== Independent Public Clinical Ophthalmology Hospital ===
Base for the Chair and Department of Ophthalmology of the Faculty of Medicine. It currently provides conservative treatment and full range of ophthalmic surgery, in addition to instruction and research activities as part of its role as a Teaching Hospital. According to the hospital's website, it considers itself a leader nationally in terms of the number of corneal transplantations performed (an average of 150–200 per annum). Specialist procedures currently carried out include: Cataract removal operations, corneal transplants, anti-glaucoma operations, operations within the posterior segment of the eyeball (vitreoretinal and extraocular operations) and selected types of plastic surgeries. The hospital is also one of the few centers in Poland where DSAEK (Descemet Stripping Automated Endothelial Keratoplasty) treatments are performed.

=== Center for Medical Simulation ===
Currently undergoing construction, the CSM will be located at Pawińskiego St, Ochota district, and is intended to significantly increase and improve upon the capabilities of the currently operating simulation center. 107–131 million Polish Zloty has been allocated towards the project (with the contract won by Porr). It will consist of two, approximately 20-meter-high buildings with a total area of more than 21,000 square meters. Planned rooms include: an operating room, delivery room, intensive care rooms, a pre-hospital care space with an ambulance, technical skill rooms, room for learning dental skills, and rooms for medical communication classes with the participation of a simulated patient.

These will be designed keeping the Objective Structured Clinical Examination (OSCE) in mind. Students at the university will be able to use these rooms for practice sewing wounds, applying dressings, or doing catheterization. Initiative to create the center was due to a 2013/14 report carried out by the school's Career Office which found practical skills to be one of the competencies that students considered too under-developed in relation to preparedness in an actual work environment post-graduation.

=== Sports and Rehabilitation Center ===
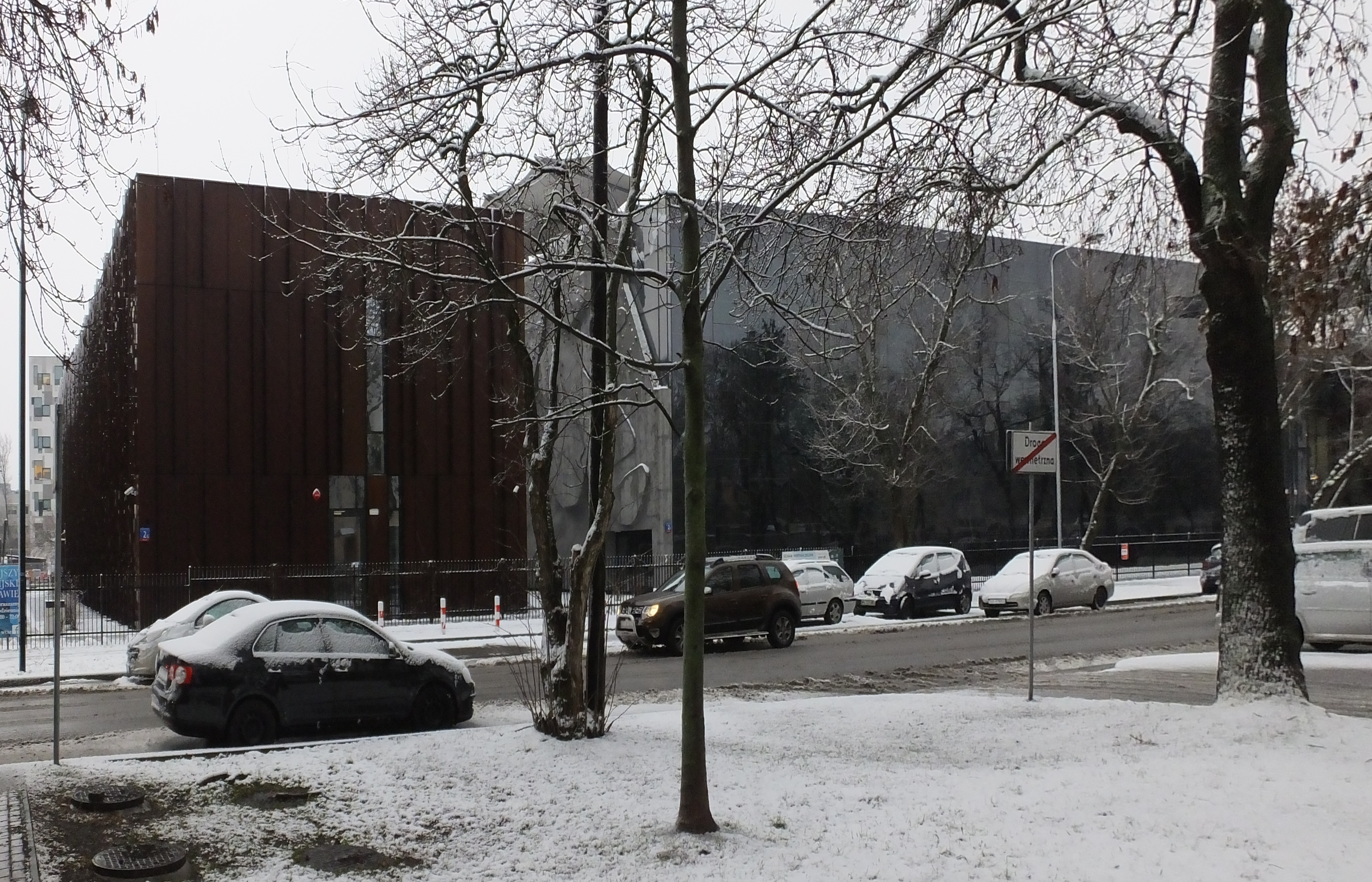
Sports and Rehabilitation Centre of the university, covered in snow.

The complex combines several functions: a sports, rehabilitation, didactic and research within a single center. It current hosts a dance hall, a multi-functional sports hall intended for team games (basketball, volleyball, indoor football, handball or tennis), a martial arts hall, and a roof terrace. The center also has an Olympic sized swimming pool (2.0–2.1 m deep, 10 lanes 2.5 m wide, with a movable bottom, spectator seating for 670 people). It comes with a sliding platform that allows the pool to be divided into two 25–meter pools with a water temperature of 26–28 °C. The hall is also equipped with a training and warm–up pool of 4 lanes and a water temperature of 29 °C. Swimming lessons, aqua aerobics, and competitions are usually held here.

=== Sites related to Culture and Art ===
==== Museum of the History of Medicine ====
Located on Zwirki and Wigury Street, in the Library and Information Centre building of the main campus, it was opened based on a statute confirmed by the Minister of Culture and National Heritage on the initiative of former Rector Marek Krawczyk. It is part of the annual Long Night of Museums event where lectures on various fields of science are held and exhibitions presented. Admission is both free and open to public visitors. On the first floor, in the Gallery of Temporary Exhibitions, there are displays about the history of medicine, as well as other areas of culture and the arts. In the rooms on the ground floor of the Library and Information Centre, work is currently underway on a permanent exhibition. Collections in exhibit include: manuscripts, old books, medical instruments, archival documents, iconography, documents about social life, recordings and films.

== Academic Profile ==
The Medical University of Warsaw has managed to establish a recognized international position in research, both in clinical and theoretical medicine. The university has scientific research cooperation with many universities and research institutions in Europe, especially Germany, France, Sweden, Netherlands, Austria and Great Britain. At present this cooperation is also being developed with other foreign partners from Europe, USA, Canada and Asia – particularly China and Japan. Presently, the school is conducting around 324 research and development projects, and didactic projects worth over 570 million PLN.

=== International Partnerships ===
The university maintains multiple partnerships through inter-institutional agreements for international student exchanges under Erasmus+ (succeeding the Erasmus Programme). Students are eligible to undergo mobility as transfer students for a semester up-to a year. At present, it has partnerships with around 120 different schools. It is also a part of the AAMC's Visiting Student Learning Opportunities™ (VSLO™) program, as one of only four medical schools within Poland currently participating in the global network.

=== Rankings ===
Universities in Poland follow a system unlike that of Europe and the rest of the world. Most general universities or colleges do not have a medical faculty, which usually exists as a separate autonomous school of their own. Since Global Rankings mostly reflect research output from each university as an indicator of their overall rank, medical universities which only publish research related to medicine are naturally disadvantaged. Regardless of this, WUM is generally placed within the Top 1000 of all tertiary schools worldwide.

Ranking Organisation	National Ranking	Global Ranking	National Medical Ranking	Global Medical Ranking
Quacquarelli Symonds	-	-	2	401
CWTS Leiden Ranking	7	657	2	259
Times Higher Education	6	1001	2	601
ARWU Shanghai	7	901	5	401
CWUR Rankings	9	917	-	-
SCImago Institutions	9	909	2	476

==== SCImago Institutions Ranking 2023 ====
According to the SCImago Institutions Rankings published in 2023 (sorted to include Universities only), the Medical University of Warsaw ranks Top 500 in the World for 20 different disciplines within Medicine. The publishing profile indicates around 791 journals through which the university's researchers has published their work for that year.

Subject	National Ranking	Global Ranking	Subject	National Ranking	Global Ranking
Dermatology	2	129	Cardiology	4	383
Pediatrics	1	151	Critical Care	4	408
Gynecology	2	189	Biomedical Engineering	1	419
Anatomy	3	198	Gastroenterology	6	423
Otorhinolaryngology	1	257	Ophthalmology	4	433
Urology	1	261	Pathology	5	446
Nephrology	3	299	Radiology	2	450
Dentistry	2	321	Infectious Diseases	2	460
Anesthesiology	4	327	Surgery	4	464
Pulmonary	3	363	Medicine	2	476

==== EduRank University Rankings 2022 ====
According to the EduRank Subject Rankings published in 2022 the Medical University of Warsaw ranks Top 500 in the World for 30 different disciplines within Medicine and Top 500 within Europe for 48 of them.

Subject	National Ranking	Global Ranking	Subject	National Ranking	Global Ranking
Cosmetology	2	80	Immunology	3	403
Pediatrics	2	218	Health Science	2	407
Dermatology	1	220	Family Medicine	2	413
Respiratory Therapy	2	238	Pathology	2	423
Cardiology	2	252	Virology	1	441
Gastroenterology	3	259	Medical Ethics	3	447
Sonography	3	262	Medical Physics	4	448
Critical Care Nursing	2	276	Psychiatry	2	450
Surgery	2	325	Dentistry	3	452
Anesthesiology	2	347	Oncology	4	457
Plastic Surgery	3	354	Pharmacology	4	459
Gynecology	3	372	Medicine	3	461
Urology	2	376	Radiation Therapy	7	462
Epidemiology	3	383	Ophthalmology	2	469
Radiology	2	392	Anatomy	2	478

== Student Life ==
=== Clubs and Societies ===
As is common with most medical universities, there are around 200 research-specific clubs at WUM catering solely to particular interests within medicine. There are little to no general-hobbyist organizations (though students are free to start one). These are known as Student Academic Clubs (SAC), managed by the Student Academic Society (SAS), and are incredibly academically oriented. Out of the 200, only about 16 are run by students in the English Division.

Information fairs are organized during Orientation Week for each club to run recruitment drive with a few also having a large social media presence. The SAS is the body responsible for managing and coordinating the activity of these research clubs, part-financing congressional trips, allocating funds for mini-research grants, and also mediation in the process of awarding mini-student grants. Finally, the SAS also organizes seminars, conferences, and awards of the 'SAN's Gold Badges' for graduates who were particularly involved in a communal level.

The International Federation of Medical Students' Associations (IFMSA; largest student organization in the world) has a chapter within Poland. The Warsaw branch is only one of the 19 branches operating in the country, its members belonging to the Medical University of Warsaw and the Lazarski University. Six permanent programs of the IFMSA-Poland exists. These permanent programs are of: Health and Reproductive Rights (SCORA), Medical Education (SCOME), Public Health (SCOPH), Human Rights and Peace (SCORP), Clinical Practices (SCOPE), and Scientific Exchange (SCORE). WUM is also a part of the European Medical Students' Association (EMSA) hosting events such as the Polish Medical Universities Championships.

Other organisations in affiliation with the university include the Polish Society of Students of Pharmacy (PTSF is a member of the European Pharmaceutical Students' Association (EPSA) and the International Federation of Students, IPSF), Student Society of Laboratory Diagnosticians (STDL), Polish Society of Dentistry Students (PTSS)

== Rectors ==
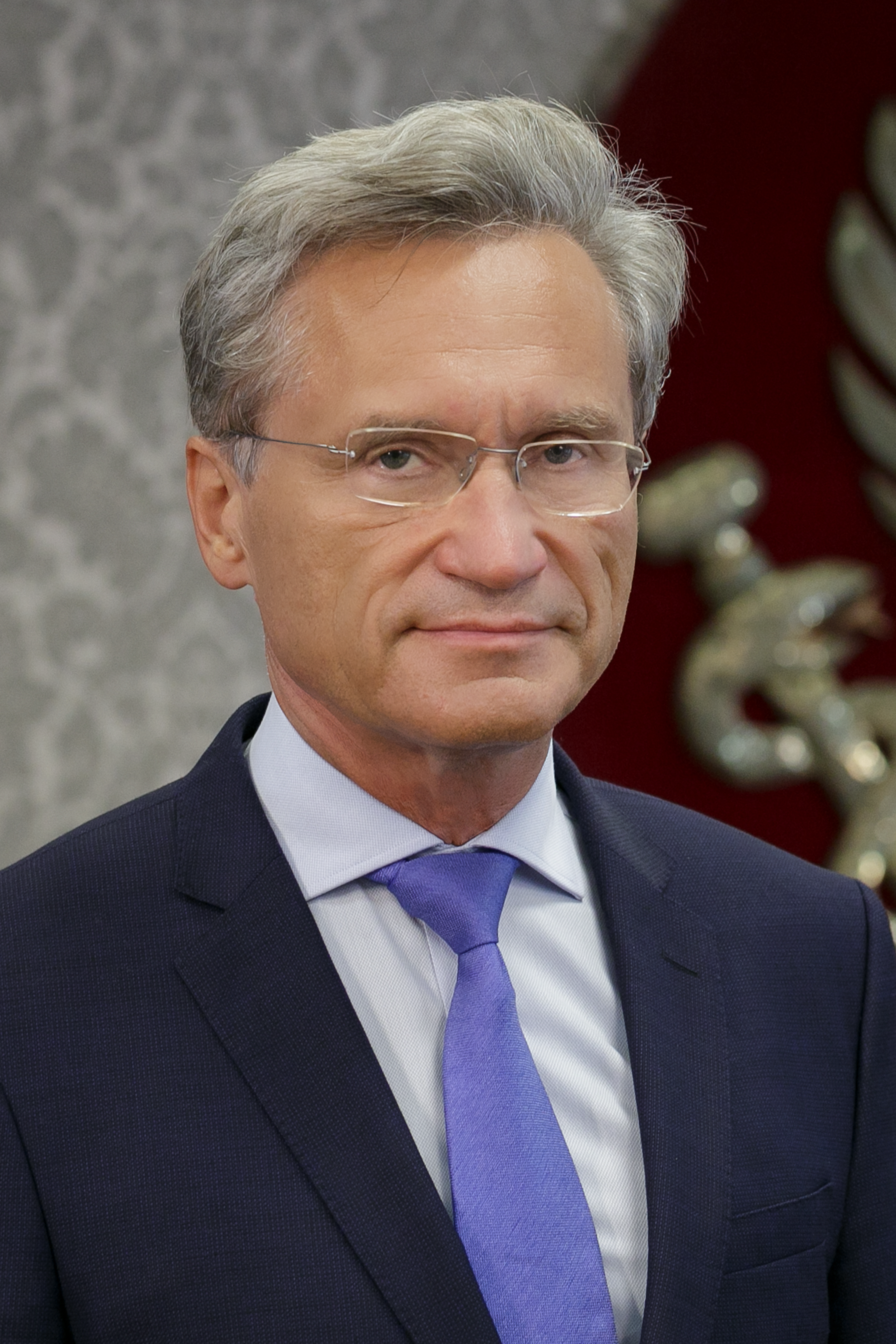
Rector 2020-2024: Prof. Zbigniew Gaciong

The list of elected rectors are as follows:

- 1950–1955: Franciszek Czubalski
- 1955–1962: Marcin Kacprzak
- 1962–1972: Bolesław Górnicki
- 1972–1979: Szczęsny Leszek Zgliczyński
- 1979–1981: Jerzy Szczerbań
- 1981–1987: Jan Nielubowicz
- 1987–1990: Bogdan Pruszyński
- 1990–1996: Tadeusz Tołłoczko
- 1996–1999: Andrzej Górski
- 1999–2005: January Piekarczyk
- 2005–2008: Leszek Pączek
- 2008–2016: Marek Krawczyk
- 2016–2020: Mirosław Wielgoś
- 2020–2024: Zbigniew Gaciong
- 2024-current: Rafał Krenke

== University council ==
=== 2016–2020 term (since 2019) ===
- Aleksander Nawrat – Chairman
- Małgorzata Adamkiewicz
- Marcin Matczak
- Artur Mamcarz
- Bolesław Samoliński
- Roman Smolarczyk
- Natalia Bierezowicz – student representative

=== 2020–2024 term ===
- Aleksander Nawrat – Chairman
- Leszek Pączek – Deputy chairman
- Marcin Matczak
- Bogdan Lang
- Kazimierz Niemczyk
- Roman Smolarczyk
- Jakub Olszewski / Agata Andrzejczyk – student representatives
