= Sokrates Starynkiewicz =

Russial general (1820–1902)

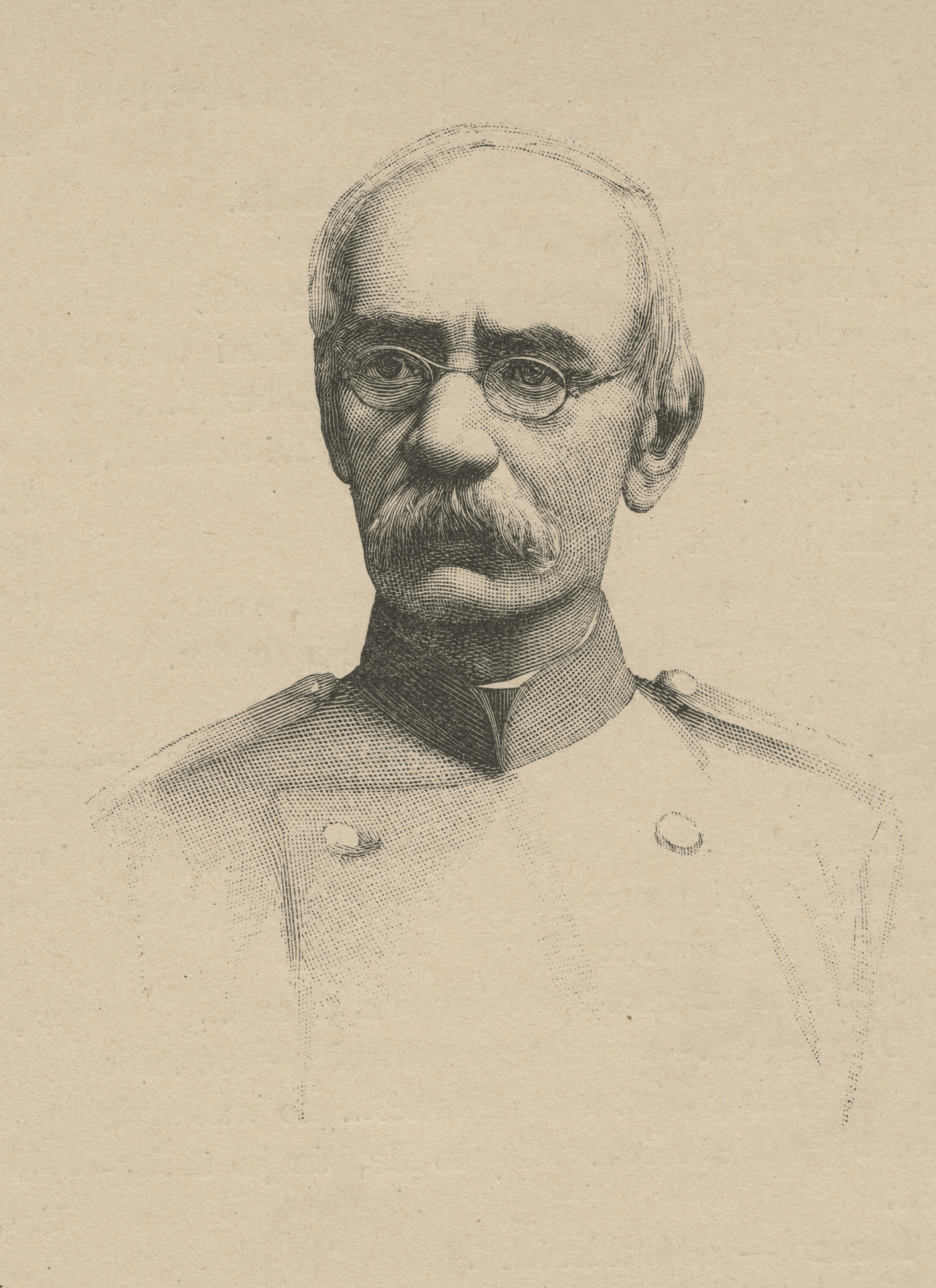
Sokrates Starynkiewicz

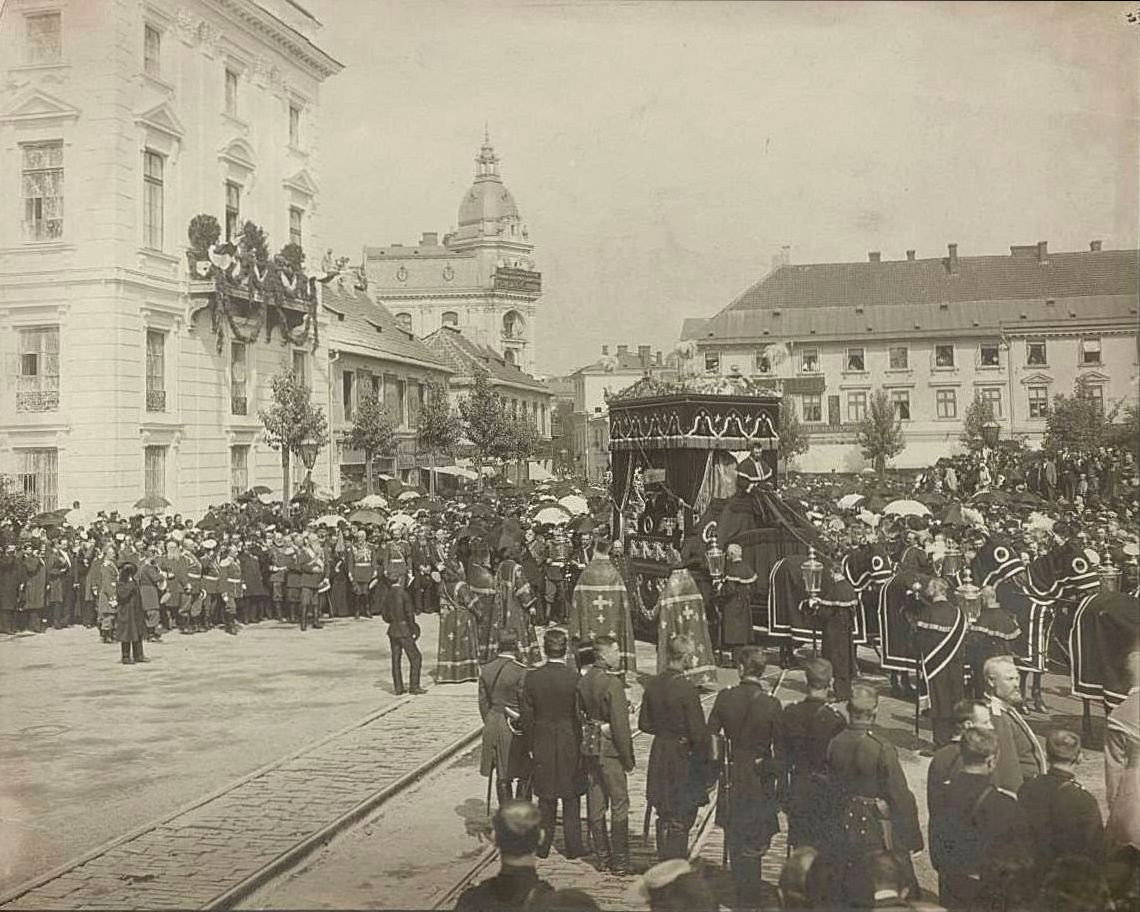
Funeral of Sokrates Starynkiewicz in Warsaw on 26 August 1902

Sokrat Ivanovich Starynkevich (Russian: Сократ Иванович Старынкевич; Polish: Sokrat Iwanowicz Starynkiewicz; 1820–1902), commonly known as Sokrates Starynkiewicz, was a Russian general and the 19th president of Warsaw, between 1875 and 1892. During his presidency he ordered the construction of municipal water works as well as the tramway and telephone network in Warsaw.

== Biography ==
Sokrates Starynkiewicz was born on 18 December 1820 in Taganrog at the Azov Sea, to the family of Ivan Aleksandrovich Starynkevich. In 1836 he joined the Imperial Russian army and graduated from several engineering and artillery schools. After promotion to officer rank he served in various staff posts. Among others, he took part in the Hungarian Campaign and Crimean War, for which he was promoted to colonel in 1858. In 1863, during the January uprising he was retired. Soon afterwards he was promoted to major general and assigned to the Russian Ministry of Interior. Between 1868 and 1871 he was briefly the military governor of Kherson, but he left that post and became the governor of Anatoly Nikolaievich Demidov, 1st Prince of San Donato's estates near Kiev and in Podolia.

On 18 November 1875 he was appointed the 19th president of Warsaw. Although at first he was considered yet another Russian official assigned to govern a Polish city, he soon became known as a great organiser and engineer. He was also a good economist and during his presidency the city's treasury more than tripled. He became particularly popular with the Varsavians after he started to consult most of his decisions with the press, a thing that was uncommon in 19th century Russia.

Among the most notable public works started by Starynkiewicz were the horse-drawn tramway net, the first telephone lines and Bródno cemetery. In 1886, he ordered the creation of the first modern sewer and water supply network, with the main hub located in the Koszyki area. In 1889 he started the Plantation Committee, which turned many Warsaw's squares and streets into parks. Between 1891 and 1892 more than 2500 trees were planted, 13 parks were refurbished and 47 streets and squares were turned into green areas for all inhabitants of Warsaw. In addition, in 1896 a new Park Ujazdowski was created which remains until now one of the most popular and picturesque parks in Warsaw.

Starynkiewicz also introduced modern gas street lighting, built a modern marketplace and started construction and paving of streets in the city centre. Finally, he ordered two censuses (in 1882 and 1892).

He retired on 6 October 1892. He decided to stay in Warsaw, where he took active part in various philanthropic societies and organisations, including the Cheap Kitchens Society which provided the poorest inhabitants with food. He died in Warsaw on 23 August 1902. The funeral procession was watched by hundreds of thousands of Varsovians from all walks of life. He is buried in the Orthodox Cemetery in Warsaw, the Warsaw borough of Wola.

== Legacy ==
- Sokrates Starynkiewicz Monument

== See also ==
- Warsaw
- President of Warsaw
