= Lindley Filters =

Water filtration system in Warsaw, Poland

Coordinates: 52°13′13″N 20°59′42″E

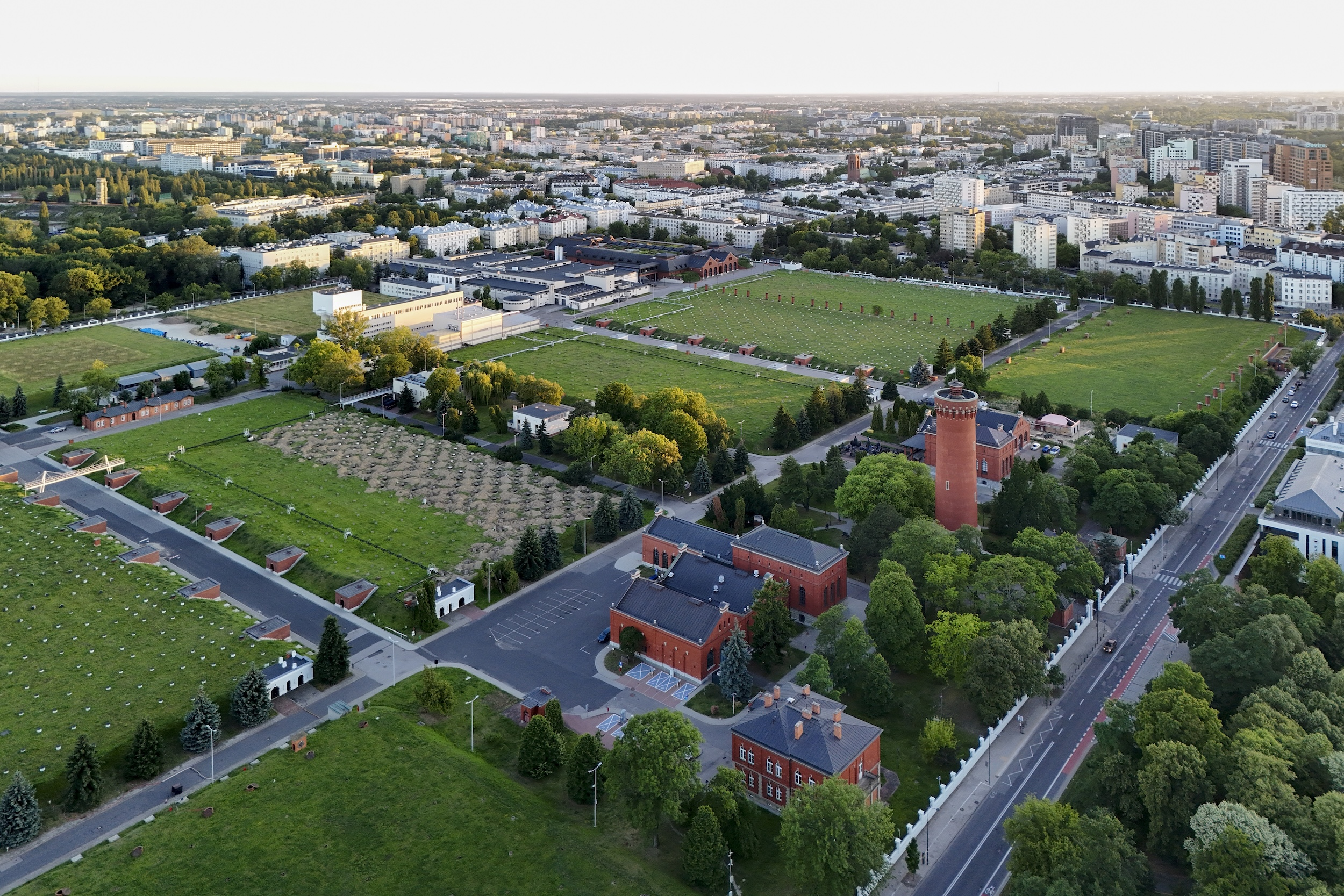
Lindley's Filters, 2025

Lindley Filters (Polish: Filtry Lindleya) is one of three Warsaw waterworks, and is located in Ochota between Koszykowa, Krzywickiego, Filtrowa and Raszyńska streets. The waterworks was finished in 1886 using William Lindley's design. Since 1973, Warsaw Filters has been on the antiquities list.

== Construction ==
Warsaw Filters was founded by the Mayor of Warsaw, Russian general Sokrates Starynkiewicz (Russian – Сократ Старинкевич). After his approval in 1881, construction started. The design by William Lindley consisted of the River Pump Station and a Filter Station on the left bank of the Vistula. During the construction, all available technologies were used, with even minor details made of high-quality resources. Basic materials used while building Filters were waterproof bricks, granite and sandstone. The first processed water was distributed to Warsaw citizens on July 3, 1886, from filters consisting of a group of slow sand filters, clean water tank, pump depot and a water tower. The design was by William Lindley, but was supervised and modernised by his son, William Heerlein Lindley.

== Waterworks system ==
In the beginning, the system was divided into:

Upper Town – supplied by water from a water tower situated in the Filters' area

Lower Town – supplied by water straight from slow sand filters (in the Powiśle and Praga districts)

The Warsaw waterworks system consisted of Filters Station (Filtry Lindleya) and River Pump Station of Central Waterworks Institute, from which water was extracted and transported to Filters Station.

== Modernisation ==
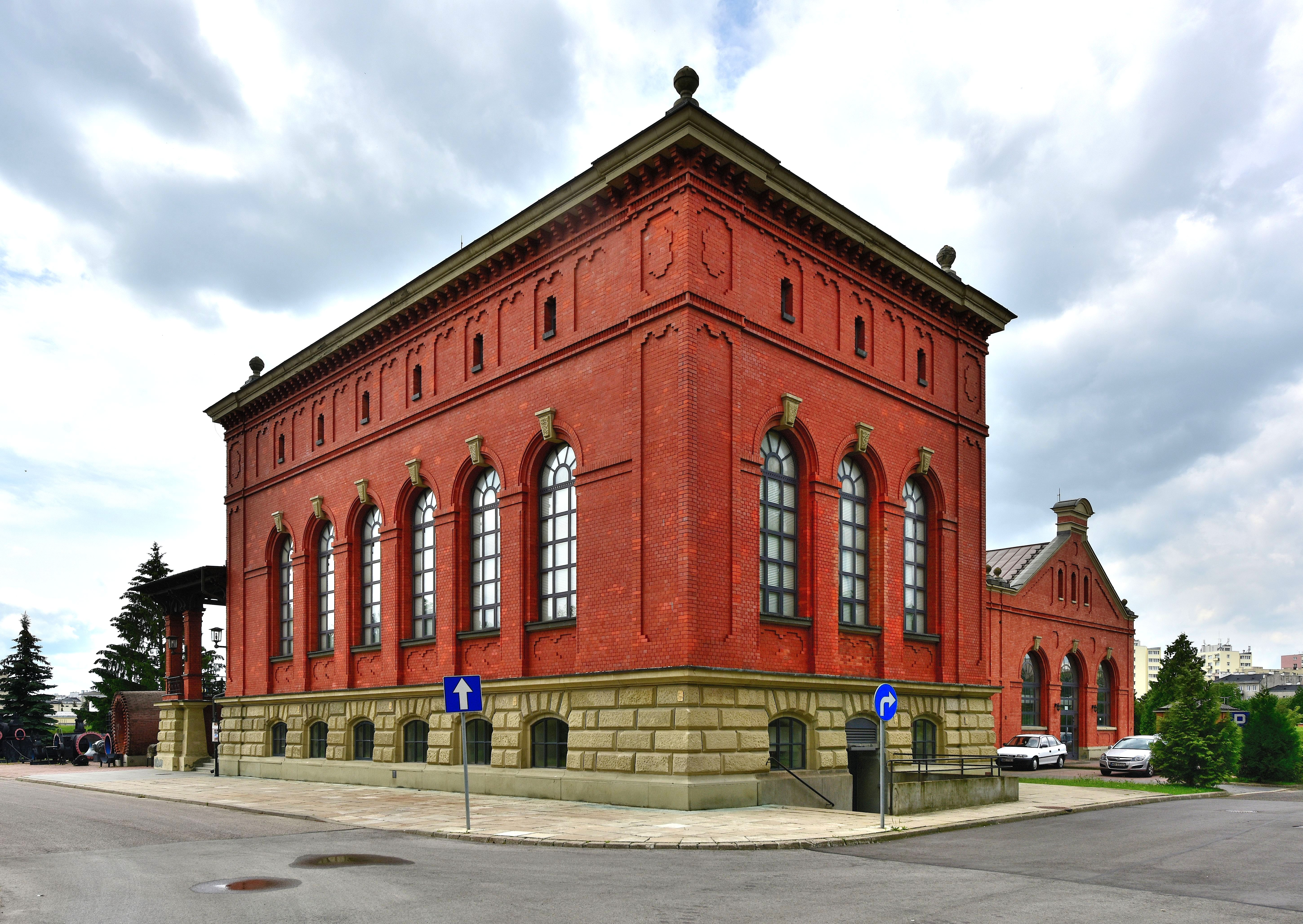
Water Filters Museum in Warsaw

Water was carried from a pumping station to slow filters, some chambers were (Imhoff tanks) processing the sewerage. Filtered water was transported to clean water tanks and then to pumping depots, where it was pushed up into a water tower, from which the Upper Town waterworks started.

A few years after deploying the filters it was necessary to add Imhoff tanks before the slow filters, as research showed contamination in the water. To implement this, Warsaw Filters was enlarged after 1890 and more tanks were built.

Growing demand for water in the early 1930s in Warsaw prompted the building of a Rapid Sand Filter Station, which treat the water from four intakes. After implementing the station, water from a pumping station was pressed into expansion vessels, then to rapid filters and slow filters.

In 1931 the chlorination of water was implemented.

The main buildings were massively damaged during the Second World War and much of the filtering equipment was stolen by German soldiers. Reconstruction after the war took several years of work.

From 2008 to 2010 indirect ozoning and carbon active filters station were built. This consists of 3 ozone generators and 18 carbon filter chambers. Modern buildings have been designed to look similar to the historic buildings. The new station is named "Socrates", after the founder of Warsaw Filters.

== As a monument ==
Warsaw Filters' protection has been upgraded three times in 1973, 2008 and, finally, in 2012, when the whole Filters complex became one of Poland's official national Historic Monuments (Pomnik historii), as designated on January 18, 2012. Its listing is maintained by the National Heritage Board of Poland.
