= National Union of Students =

National Union of Students may refer to:

- National Union of Students (Australia)
- National Union of Students (Brazil)
- National Union of Students (Canada)
- National Union of Students in Denmark
- Union Nationale des Étudiants de France
- National Union of Ghana Students
- National Union of Students and Pupils of Mali
- National Union of Students (Papua New Guinea)
- National Union of Students of the Philippines
- National Union of Students of Saudi Arabia
- Swedish National Union of Students
- Swaziland National Union of Students
- National Union of Students in Switzerland
- National Union of Students (United Kingdom)
  - National Union of Students–Union of Students in Ireland
  - National Union of Students Scotland
  - National Union of Students Wales

== See also ==
- Students' union
- International Union of Students
