= National postgraduate representative body =

Student organization in various countries

A national postgraduate representative body exists in many countries and represents postgraduate students/researchers undertaking their doctorate (PhD) or postdoctoral research. Some postdoctoral researchers may however be represented by a separate organisation, or a relevant trade union. Some organisations have a broader remit to represent all postgraduates, including those taking master's degrees. A few countries have no specific body but are represented by a national students' union, including undergraduate students.

In Europe, many of the national postgraduate bodies are member organisations of the European Council of Doctoral Candidates and Junior Researchers (Eurodoc), an umbrella organisation representing early-career researchers in Europe. The national students' unions meanwhile, are typically members of the European Students' Union, but some, such as AMLÉ, ANOSR and SFS-DK may have joint membership of both umbrella organisations.

== List of national postgraduate representative bodies by country ==
=== Doctoral bodies ===
- Armenia – Ecosocium, Young Scientists NGO
- Australia – Council of Australian Postgraduate Associations
- Austria – Netzwerk Unterbau Wissenschaft (NuWiss)
- Azerbaijan – Azerbaijan Young Scientists, Postgraduates and Masters Union (AYSPMU)
- Belgium – Focus Research
- Bulgaria – Asociacija na doktorantite v Bylgarija (ADB)
- Croatia – Association Penkala
- Czech Republic – Studentská komora Rady vysokých škol (SK RVŠ)
- Denmark – PhD Association Network of Denmark (PAND)
- Estonia – Estonian Doctoral Society (DOCSOC)
- France – Association Nationale des Docteurs (ANDès)
- Germany – The interdisciplinary network for PhD candidates and doctorate holders in Germany (THESIS)
- Greece – Elliniki Epistimoniki Etaireia Ypopsifion Didaktoron
- Hungary – Association of Hungarian PhD and DLA Candidates (DOSZ)
- Italy – Association of PhD candidates and PhDs in Italy (ADI)
- Lithuania – Lithuanian Society of Young Researchers (LSYR)
- Moldova – ATCM Pro-Stiinta
- Netherlands – PhD Network Netherlands (PNN)
- Norway – Stipendiatorganisasjonene i Norge) (SiN)
- Poland – Polish National Association of Doctoral Candidates (KRD)
- Portugal – Associação dos Bolseiros de Investigação Cientifica (ABIC)
- Russia – Young Researchers
- Slovakia – Asociácia doktorandov Slovenska (ADS)
- Slovenia – Drustvo Mladih Raziskovalcev Slovenije (DMRS)
- Spain – Federación de Jóvenes Investigadores/Precarios)
- Switzerland – Actionuni der Schweizer Mittelbau (Actionuni)
- Ukraine – Young Scientists Council at the Ministry of Education and Science of Ukraine (YSC)
- United States – National Association of Graduate-Professional Students (NAGPS)

=== National students' unions ===
- Austria - Austrian National Union of Students (Österreichische HochschülerInnenschaft - ÖH)
- Ireland - Aontas na Mac Léinn in Éirinn (AMLÉ)
- Romania - National Alliance of Student Organizations in Romania (ANOSR)
- Sweden – Swedish National Union of Students Doctoral Committee (SFS-DK)
- United Kingdom – National Union of Students UK (NUS UK)

=== Postdoctoral bodies ===
- Ireland - Irish Research Staff Association (IRSA)
- Sweden – Swedish Network of Postdoc Associations (SNPA)

=== Trade unions representing early-career researchers ===
- France – Federation of Education, Research and Culture (FERG-CGT)
- Ireland – Irish Federation of University Teachers
