= EUL =

EUL may refer to:

- Caldwell Industrial Airport, in Idaho, United States
- Federation of Estonian Student Unions (Estonian: Eesti Üliõpilaskondade Liit)
- Emergency Use Listing, see World Health Organization's response to the COVID-19 pandemic
- Enhanced Uplink
- Eskom Uganda Limited, a Ugandan energy company
- Estonian Swimming Federation (Estonian: Eesti Ujumisliit)
- European United Left (disambiguation)
- European University of Lefke
- Lisbon University Stadium (Portuguese: Estádio Universitário de Lisboa)
