= European Students' Union =

Pan-European students' union

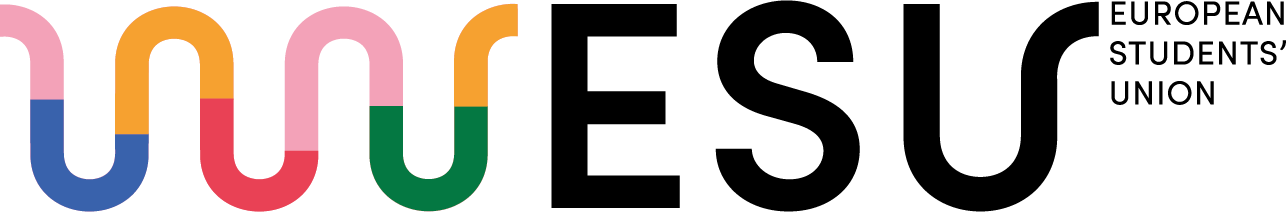
- Institution: see members list
- Location: Av. de Tervueren 155, 1150 Brussels Brussels, Belgium
- Established: 1982
- President: Daciana Pop
- Vice presidents: Franziska Sophia Knogler, Bálint Koós
- Members: 43 (40 Countries)
- Affiliations: European Youth Forum
- Executive Committee: see representatives
- Website: esu-online.org

The European Students' Union (ESU) is the umbrella organisation of 43 national unions of students from 40 countries, representing almost 20 million students. A consultative member of the Bologna Process, ESU is also a full member of the European Youth Forum (YFJ).

== History ==
On 17 October 1982, seven National Unions of Students (NUSes) from the United Kingdom, Sweden, Iceland, France, Denmark, Norway and Austria established the Western European Students Information Bureau (WESIB) at a gathering in Stockholm. In February 1990, WESIB dropped the "W" to become the European Student Information Bureau (ESIB) following the political upheaval in Europe at the time. In 1992 the name was changed yet again into the National Union of Students in Europe. This reflected the recognition of the changing mission of ESIB from being a pure information-sharing organisation into a political organisation that represented the views of students in European institutions. In May 2007, the current name, European Students' Union (ESU), was introduced.

Over the years, the office of ESU has moved around Europe and was first hosted by the member NUSes. Following the establishment of WESIB in Stockholm, the office was based in the SFS Office in Sweden from 1982 until 1985, funded by a grant by the Swedish Government. By 1985 the grant was running low, and so NUS UK offered to host WESIB in their London headquarters. In 1988, the office moved to the ÖH offices in Vienna and remained there until 2000 when it was decided that for reasons of being near the European institutions, the office should move to Brussels and was hosted by VVS.

== Structures ==
The highest ESU structure is the "board meeting", bringing together representatives from all the National Unions of Students it represents. The board meeting sets the organisation's policy direction and elects members to the executive committee to run the organisation.

=== Executive committee ===
The executive committee (EC) is elected for a one-year term at the annual board meeting by representatives of the member organisations, with each country (not organisation) given two votes. The president and vice-presidents together make up the presidency of ESU, and are responsible for the day-to-day operations of the organisation along with the seven general members of the EC.

As of 2025, the executive committee includes:

Title		Name	Country
Presidency	President	Lana Par	Croatia
Presidency	Vice Presidents	Daciana Pop	Romania
Presidency	Vice Presidents	Arno Schrooyen	Belgium
Executive Committee		Duarte Lopes	Portugal
Executive Committee		Franziska Sophia Knogler	Austria
Executive Committee		Bálint Koós	Hungary
Executive Committee		Katariina Järve	Estonia
Executive Committee		Luka Lešić	Croatia
Executive Committee		Urszula Lis	Poland
Executive Committee		Nora Angelova	Bulgaria

== Member organisations ==
Country	English name	Local name	ESU Abbrev. (Note: Abbreviation given in ESU's member list, may differ from the associations' local or official abbreviations)
Armenia	Armenian National Students Association	Հայ ուսանողական ազգային ասոցիացիա	ANSA
Austria	Austrian Students' Association	Österreichische Hochschülerinnen- und Hochschülerschaft	ÖH
Belarus	Belarusian Students' Association	Задзіночанне Беларускіх Студэнтаў	BSA
Belarus	Brotherhood of Organizers of Student Self-Government	БОСС	BOSS
Belgium	Federation of French-speaking Students	Fédération Des Etudiants Francophones	FEF
Belgium	Flemish Union of Students	Vlaamse Vereniging van Studenten	VVS
Bosnia and Herzegovina	Students' Union Republic of Srpska	Unija studenata Republike Srpske	SURS
Bulgaria	National Assembly of Student's Councils in the Republic of Bulgaria	Национално представителство на студентските съвети в Република България	NASC
Croatia	Croatian Students' Council	Hrvatski Studentski Zbor	CSC
Cyprus	Pancyprian Federation of Student Unions	Pagkypria Omospondia Foititikon Enoseon	POFEN
Czech Republic	Student Chamber of the Council of Higher Education Institutions	Studentská komora Rady vysokých škol	SKRVS
Denmark	National Union of Students in Denmark	Danske Studerendes Fællesråd	DSF
Estonia	Federation of Estonian Student Unions	Eesti Üliõpilaskondade Liit	EÜL
Faroe Islands	Faroese National Union of Students	Meginfelag Føroyskra Studenta	MFS
Finland	National Union of University Students in Finland	Suomen Ylioppilaskuntien Liitto, Finlands studentkårers förbund	SYL, FSF
Finland	Union of Students in Finnish Universities of Applied Sciences	Suomen opiskelijakuntien liitto, Finlands studerandekårers förbund	SAMOK
France	National Federation of Student's Associations	Fédération des Associations Générales d'Étudiants	FAGE
Georgia	Georgian Student's Organizations Association	Georgian Student's Organizations Association	GSOA
Germany	Free Association of Student Unions	freier zusammenschluss von student*innenschaften	fzs
Hungary	National Union of Students in Hungary	Hallgatói Önkormányzatok Országos Konferenciája	HÖOK
Iceland	National Union of Icelandic Students	Landssamtök íslenskra stúdenta	LÍS
Ireland	Aontas na Mac Léinn in Éirinn	Aontas na Mac Léinn in Éirinn	AMLÉ
Israel	National Union of Israeli Students	התאחדות הסטודנטים בישראל تحاد الطلاب في إسرائيل	NUIS
Italy	Union of University Students	Unione degli Universitari	UdU
Latvia	Student Union of Latvia	Latvijas Studentu apvienība	LSA
Lithuania	Lithuanian National Union of Students	Lietuvos Studentu Sajunga	LSS
Luxembourg	National Union of Students in Luxembourg	Union Nationale des Etudiant(e)s du Luxembourg	UNEL
Malta	University Students' Council	Kunsill Studenti Universitarji	KSU
Moldova	Student Alliance of Moldova	Alianta studentilor din Moldova	ASM
Montenegro	Student Parliament of the University of Montenegro	Studentski Parlament Univerziteta Crne Gore	SPUM
Netherlands	Dutch National Students Association	Interstedelijk Studenten Overleg	ISO
Netherlands	Dutch Student Union	Landelijke Studentenvakbond	LSVb
Norway	National Union of Students' in Norway	Norsk studentorganisasjon	NSO
Poland	Students' Parliament of Poland	Parlament Studentów Rzeczypospolitej Polskiej	PSRP
Portugal	Academic Forum for Information and External Representation	Fórum Académico para Informação e Representação Externa	FAIRe
Romania	National Alliance of Student Organizations in Romania	Alianta Nationala a Organizatiilor Studentesti din Romania	ANOSR
Serbia	Students Conference of Serbian Universities	Studentska konferencija univerzitetâ Srbije	SKONUS
Slovakia	Student Council for Higher Education	Študentská Rada Vysokých Škôl	SRVS
Slovenia	Slovene Student Union	Studenska Organizacija Slovenije	ŠOS
Spain	Coordinator of Student Representatives of Public Universities	Coordinadora de Representantes de Estudiantes de Universidades Públicas	CREUP
Sweden	Swedish National Union of Students	Sveriges Förenade Studentkårer	SFS
Switzerland	VSS-UNES-USU	Verband Schweizer Studierendenschaften; Union des Etudiant-e-s de Suisse; Unione Svizzera degli Universitari	VSS-UNES-USU
Ukraine	Ukrainian Association of Student Self-government	Українська асоціація студентського самоврядування	UAS
United Kingdom	National Union of Students		NUS-UK

=== Candidate members ===
Candidate-members are NUSes that have submitted an application of membership to ESU but have not yet been granted member status by the Board Meeting. Candidate-members retain their status for one year and are subject to a "study visit" by ESU to ensure they meet membership criteria.

Country	English name	Local name	ESU Abbrev.
North Macedonia	National Students’ Assembly	Државно Студентско Собрание	NSA

== Associate organisations ==
Associate members of ESU are pan-European and international student organisations that have similar goals to ESU. The criteria for associate membership require the organisation to be democratic and student-run, have either students or NUSes as members, and represent students from at least 8 countries that are parties to the European Cultural Convention. Associate organizations can attend and speak at all ESU meetings, but cannot vote at Board Meetings.

- Association of Norwegian Students Abroad (ANSA)
- European Dental Students Association (EDSA)
- European Deaf Students' Union (EDSU)
- European Federation of Psychology Students’ Associations (EFPSA)
- European Medical Students' Association (EMSA)
- European Nursing Students Association (ENSA)
- European Pharmaceutical Students' Association (EPSA)
- European Union of Jewish Students (EUJS)
- Forum of European Muslim Youth and Student Organisation (FEMYSO)
- International Association for Political Science Students (IAPSS)
- International Federation of Medical Students' Associations (IFMSA)
- International Lesbian, Gay, Bisexual, Transgender and Queer Youth and Student Organisation (IGLYO)
- International Students of History Association (ISHA)
- Organising Bureau of European School Student Unions (OBESSU)

== List of executive representatives ==
Year (Mandate)	President	Country of President	Vice Presidents	Executive Committee	Coordinators (appointed by the executive committee)
2026-2025	Daciana Pop	Romania	Franziska Sophia Knogler Austria	Nora Angelova, Katariina Järve, Luka Lešić, Andreé Lindahl, Urszula Lis, Bryan O'Mahony, Bianca Pace	Julie Havlová
2026-2025	Daciana Pop	Romania	Bálint Koós Hungary	Nora Angelova, Katariina Järve, Luka Lešić, Andreé Lindahl, Urszula Lis, Bryan O'Mahony, Bianca Pace	Julie Havlová
2025–2026	Lana Par	Croatia	Daciana Pop Romania	Duarte Lopes, Franziska Sophia Knogler, Bálint Koós, Katariina Järve, Luka Lešić, Nora Angelova, Urszula Lis	Bianca Pace
2025–2026	Lana Par	Croatia	Arno Schrooyen Belgium	Duarte Lopes, Franziska Sophia Knogler, Bálint Koós, Katariina Järve, Luka Lešić, Nora Angelova, Urszula Lis	Bianca Pace
2024–2025	Iris Kimizoglu	Germany	Lana Par Croatia	Duarte Lopes, Jens Bartnes, Lauren Pray, Levente Varga, Lisa Schivalocchi, Nora Angelova, Tamara Ciobanu	Estelle Née, Magnus við Streym, Urszula Lis
2024–2025	Iris Kimizoglu	Germany	Arno Schrooyen Belgium	Duarte Lopes, Jens Bartnes, Lauren Pray, Levente Varga, Lisa Schivalocchi, Nora Angelova, Tamara Ciobanu	Estelle Née, Magnus við Streym, Urszula Lis
2023–2024	Horia-Șerban Onița	Romania	Iris Kimizoglu Germany	Joanna Maruszczak (until October), Lana Par (substituting Joanna Maruszczak), Andrej Pirjevec, Ana Gvritishvili, Arno Schrooyen, Ida Flemmich, Tamara Ciobanu, Tór Marni Weihe (until October), Magnus við Streym (substituting Tór Marni Weihe)	Emily MacPherson, Bastien Degardins, Lauren Pray
2023–2024	Horia-Șerban Onița	Romania	Tanguy Guibert France	Joanna Maruszczak (until October), Lana Par (substituting Joanna Maruszczak), Andrej Pirjevec, Ana Gvritishvili, Arno Schrooyen, Ida Flemmich, Tamara Ciobanu, Tór Marni Weihe (until October), Magnus við Streym (substituting Tór Marni Weihe)	Emily MacPherson, Bastien Degardins, Lauren Pray
2022–2023	Matteo Vespa	Italy	Katrīna Sproģe Latvia	Tanguy Guibert, Iris Kimizoglu, Andrej Pirjevec, Emily MacPherson, Tór Marni Weihe, Oraz Myradov, Ana Gvritishvili	Antoine Bakhash, Joanna Maruszczak, Sandi Rizvić
2022–2023	Matteo Vespa	Italy	Horia-Șerban Onița Romania	Tanguy Guibert, Iris Kimizoglu, Andrej Pirjevec, Emily MacPherson, Tór Marni Weihe, Oraz Myradov, Ana Gvritishvili	Antoine Bakhash, Joanna Maruszczak, Sandi Rizvić
2021–2022	Martina Darmanin	Malta	Zamzam Ibrahim UK	Matteo Vespa, Kristel Jakobson, Martin Hammerbauer, Pegi Pavletić, Ruben Janssens, Meral Nur, Stanimir Boyadzhiev	Katrīna Sproģe, Borna Nemet, Anastasia Kreis
2021–2022	Martina Darmanin	Malta	Jakub Grodecki Poland	Matteo Vespa, Kristel Jakobson, Martin Hammerbauer, Pegi Pavletić, Ruben Janssens, Meral Nur, Stanimir Boyadzhiev	Katrīna Sproģe, Borna Nemet, Anastasia Kreis
2021	Martina Darmanin	Malta	Zamzam Ibrahim UK	Matteo Vespa, Kristel Jakobson, Martin Hammerbauer, Pegi Pavletić, Ruben Janssens, Ronja Hesse, Otto Rosenlund	Vicky Reichling, Borna Nemet, Carmen Romero (until June), Katrīna Sproģe (substituting Carmen Romero)
2021	Martina Darmanin	Malta	Jakub Grodecki Poland	Matteo Vespa, Kristel Jakobson, Martin Hammerbauer, Pegi Pavletić, Ruben Janssens, Ronja Hesse, Otto Rosenlund	Vicky Reichling, Borna Nemet, Carmen Romero (until June), Katrīna Sproģe (substituting Carmen Romero)
2019–2020	Gohar Hovhannisyan (Oct.-Dec. 2020)	Armenia	Martina Darmanin Malta	Monika Skadborg, Ursa Leban, Nina De Winter, Rajko Golovic, Helene Mariaud, Daniel Altman, Jakub Grodecki,	Martin Paluoja, Daniel Lindblom (until November), Carmen Romero (substituting Daniel Lindblom)
2019–2020	Gohar Hovhannisyan (Oct.-Dec. 2020)	Armenia	Sebastian Berger Austria	Monika Skadborg, Ursa Leban, Nina De Winter, Rajko Golovic, Helene Mariaud, Daniel Altman, Jakub Grodecki,	Martin Paluoja, Daniel Lindblom (until November), Carmen Romero (substituting Daniel Lindblom)
2019–2020	Robert Napier (until Sept. 2020)	Malta	Gohar Hovhannisyan Armenia	Daniel Altman, Jakub Grodecki, Monika Skadborg, Ursa Leban, Nina De Winter, Rajko Golovic, Helene Mariaud	Martina Darmanin, Daniel Lindblom, Martin Paluoja
2019–2020	Robert Napier (until Sept. 2020)	Malta	Sebastian Berger Austria	Daniel Altman, Jakub Grodecki, Monika Skadborg, Ursa Leban, Nina De Winter, Rajko Golovic, Helene Mariaud	Martina Darmanin, Daniel Lindblom, Martin Paluoja
2018–2019	Adam Gajek	Poland	Katrina Koppel Estonia	Daniel Altma, Joāo Martins, Gohar Hovhannisyan, Monika Skadborg, Sebastian Berger, Ursa Leban, Yulia Dobyshuk	Rob Henthorn, Hélène Mariaud, Marie Desrousseaux, (1st part of mandate), Martina Darmanin (substituting Marie Desrousseaux)
2018–2019	Adam Gajek	Poland	Robert Napier Malta	Daniel Altma, Joāo Martins, Gohar Hovhannisyan, Monika Skadborg, Sebastian Berger, Ursa Leban, Yulia Dobyshuk	Rob Henthorn, Hélène Mariaud, Marie Desrousseaux, (1st part of mandate), Martina Darmanin (substituting Marie Desrousseaux)
2017–2018	Helge Schwitters	Norway	Caroline Sundberg Sweden	Chiara Patricolo, Aleksandar Šušnjar, Filip Prihoda, Gohar Hovhannisyan, João Pedro Estêvão Martins, Katrina Koppel, Yolanda Trujillo Adriá	Simona Gamonte, Patrick Dempsey, Robert Henthorn
2017–2018	Helge Schwitters	Norway	Adam Gajek Poland	Chiara Patricolo, Aleksandar Šušnjar, Filip Prihoda, Gohar Hovhannisyan, João Pedro Estêvão Martins, Katrina Koppel, Yolanda Trujillo Adriá	Simona Gamonte, Patrick Dempsey, Robert Henthorn
2016–2017	Lea Meister	Switzerland	Līva Vikmane Latvia	Beth Button, Gramoz Shpendi, Adam Gajek, Aleksandar Šušnjar, Frederik Bach, Chiara Patricolo, Milana Jankovic (1st part of mandate), Helga Lind Mar (substituting Milana Jankovic)	Melanie Fröhlich, Filip Prihoda, Helge Schwitters
2016–2017	Lea Meister	Switzerland	Blazhe Todorovski North Macedonia	Beth Button, Gramoz Shpendi, Adam Gajek, Aleksandar Šušnjar, Frederik Bach, Chiara Patricolo, Milana Jankovic (1st part of mandate), Helga Lind Mar (substituting Milana Jankovic)	Melanie Fröhlich, Filip Prihoda, Helge Schwitters
2015–2016	Fernando Miguel Galán Palomares	Spain	Lea Meister Switzerland	Liva Vikmane, Karolina Pietkiewicz, Cristi Popescu, Rebecka Stenkvist, Tijana Isoski, Viktor Grønne	Melanie Fröhlich, Chiara Patricolo, Martin Retelj
2015–2016	Fernando Miguel Galán Palomares	Spain	Blazhe Todorovski North Macedonia	Liva Vikmane, Karolina Pietkiewicz, Cristi Popescu, Rebecka Stenkvist, Tijana Isoski, Viktor Grønne	Melanie Fröhlich, Chiara Patricolo, Martin Retelj
2014–2015	Elisabeth Gehrke	Sweden	Erin Nordal Norway	Blazhe Todorovski, Maksimas Milta, Cat O’Driscoll, Karolina Pietkiewicz, Lea Meister, Tiago Estêvão Martins, Tijana Isoski	Melanie Fröhlich, William Benn, Viktor Grønne
2014–2015	Elisabeth Gehrke	Sweden	Fernando Miguel Galán Palomares Spain	Blazhe Todorovski, Maksimas Milta, Cat O’Driscoll, Karolina Pietkiewicz, Lea Meister, Tiago Estêvão Martins, Tijana Isoski	Melanie Fröhlich, William Benn, Viktor Grønne
2013–2014	Rok Primozic	Slovenia	Elisabeth Gehrke Sweden	Fernando Miguel Galán Palomares, Erin Nordal, Elin Blomqvist, Nevena Vuksanovic, Blazhe Todorovski, Maroš Korman, Maksim Milto, Michael Tolentino Frederiksen	Gabriela Bergan, Tiago Estêvão Martins, Aengus Ó Maoláin (1st part of mandate), Melanie Fröhlich (substituting Aengus Ó Maoláin)
2013–2014	Rok Primozic	Slovenia	Fernando Miguel Galán Palomares Spain	Fernando Miguel Galán Palomares, Erin Nordal, Elin Blomqvist, Nevena Vuksanovic, Blazhe Todorovski, Maroš Korman, Maksim Milto, Michael Tolentino Frederiksen	Gabriela Bergan, Tiago Estêvão Martins, Aengus Ó Maoláin (1st part of mandate), Melanie Fröhlich (substituting Aengus Ó Maoláin)
2012–2013	Karina Ufert	Lithuania	Taina Moisander Finland	Fernando M.Galan Palomares, Florian Kaiser, Blazhe Todorovski, Tinja Zerzer, Nevena Vuksanovic, Elisabeth Gehrke, Liliya Ivanova	Aengus Ó Maoláin, Karl Agius, Brikena Xhomaqi (until November 2012), Gabriela Bergan (substituting Brikena Xhomaqi)
2012–2013	Karina Ufert	Lithuania	Rok Primozic Slovenia	Fernando M.Galan Palomares, Florian Kaiser, Blazhe Todorovski, Tinja Zerzer, Nevena Vuksanovic, Elisabeth Gehrke, Liliya Ivanova	Aengus Ó Maoláin, Karl Agius, Brikena Xhomaqi (until November 2012), Gabriela Bergan (substituting Brikena Xhomaqi)
2011–2012	Allan Päll	Estonia	Rok Primozic Slovenia	Nevena Vuksanovic, Kaloyan Kostadinov	
2010–2011	Bert Vandenkendelaere	Belgium	Rasa Cincyte Lithuania	Robert Santa, Karina Ufert	
2009–2010	Ligia Deca	Romania	Allan Päll Estonia	Andrea Blättler, Alma Joensen, Bert Vandenkendelaere	
2008–2009	Ligia Deca	Romania	Anita Lice Latvia	Bruno Carapinha, Alma Joensen, Olav Øye	
2007	Koen Geven	The Netherlands		Anela Beso, Bartlomiej Banaszak, Lara Lena Tischler, Maria Noleryd, Matthew Tabone, Viorel Proteasa, Rossella Iraci Capuccinello	
2006	Justin Fenech	Malta		Maher Tekaya, Sime Visic, Marja-Liisa Alop, Tatsiana Khoma, Victor Vidilles, Janja Komljenovic	
2005	Vanja Ivosevic	Croatia		Öyvind Reidar Bakke, Justin Fenech, Marzia Foroni, Katja Kamsek, Jean-Baptiste Prévost, Marija Stambolieva	
2004	Johan Almqvist	Sweden		Marzia Foroni, Lene Henriksen, Vanja Ivosevic, Péter Puskás, Robin Semal, Chris Weavers	
2003	Stefan Bienefeld	Germany		Johan Almqvist, Mads Aspelin, Nikki Heerens, Vanja Ivosevic, Marija Mitrovic, Bettina Schwarzmayr	
2002	Martina Vukasovic	Serbia		Petra Arsic, Stefan Bienefeld, John C. Friend-Pereira, Chris O’Sullivan	
2001	Jacob Henricson	Sweden		Stefan Bienefeld, Ante Matic, Marlous Veldt, Martina Vukasovic	
2000	Remi Bordu	France		Polona Car, Aleksandar Dimiskov, Magne Hustavenes, Taru Liira	
1999	Antti Pentikäinen	Finland		Remi Bourdu, Anja Kovacs, Marieke Rietbergen, Uros Vajgl	
1998	Peter Sondgaard	Denmark		Antti Pentikäinen, Judith Sargentini, Emese Szitasi, Hilde W. Wibe	
1997	Agnieszka Bolimowska	Poland		Malcolm Byrne, Outi Hannula, Helena Randerborg, Reuben Seychell	
1994 - 1996	Stephen Grogan	UK			

Prior to 1997 ESIB was Chaired by a NUS instead of an individual, though its first director was employed in 1994.

Year	Union	Country
1996	Hökosz	Hungary
1995	SYL	Finland
1994	SYL	Finland
1993	SFS	Sweden
1992	SFS	Sweden
1991	VVS-UNES	Switzerland
1990	NUS (UK)	United Kingdom
1989	NUS (UK)	United Kingdom
1988	ÖH	Austria

== Notable people ==
- Ligia Deca, Minister of Education (Romania)
- Carmen Ria Smith, Baroness Smith of Llanfaes, member of the House of Lords (United Kingdom)

== See also ==
- Eurodoc
- European University Association
- Education International
