= Plastic Surgery Hospital, Chinese Academy of Medical Sciences =

Plastic Surgery Hospital, CAMS 中国医学科学院整形外科医院
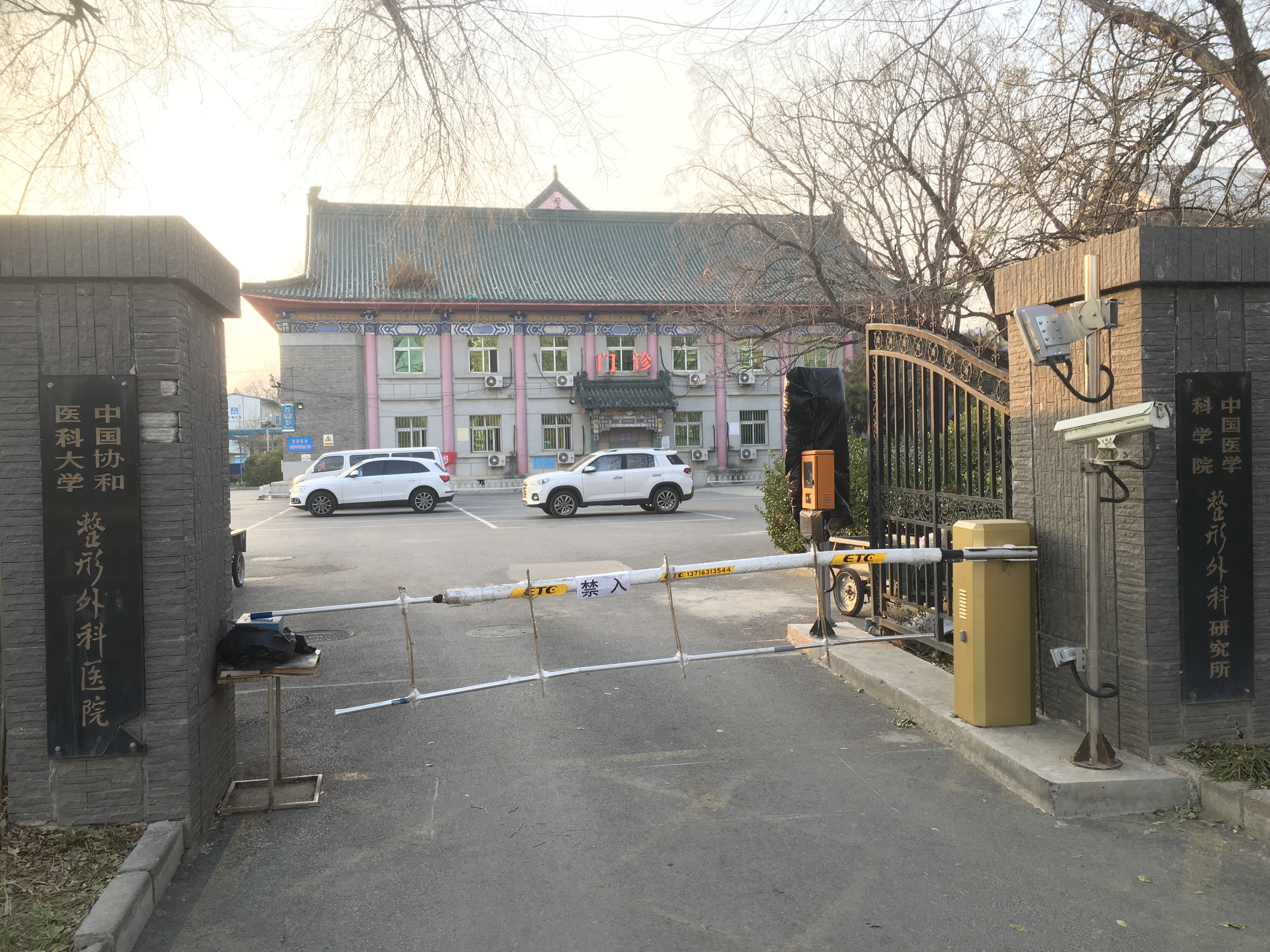
- Plastic Surgery Hospital, Chinese Academy of Medical Sciences

Geography
- Location: No. 33, Badachu Road, Shijingshan District, Beijing, People's Republic of China

Organisation
- Type: public, specialist hospital
- Affiliated university: Chinese Academy of Medical Sciences

Services
- Standards: 3A
- Beds: 700

History
- Founded: 1957

Links
- Website: https://www.zhengxing.com.cn/

The Plastic Surgery Hospital of the Chinese Academy of Medical Sciences, also known as the Badachu Plastic Surgery Hospital, is a leader in plastic surgery in China. Its predecessor was the Asian and African Students Sanatorium of the International Union of Students established in 1957 as China's earliest hospital for plastic surgery. It is now a Grade A tertiary hospital integrating medical treatment, teaching, and scientific research. The hospital is affiliated with the Chinese Academy of Medical Sciences (CAMS) and is located on Badachu Road, Shijingshan District, Beijing.

== History ==
In the 1950s, the International Union of Students entrusted the All-China Students' Federation to establish and build the "Asian and African Students Sanatorium of the International Student Union". On 21 February 1951, Premier Zhou Enlai personally selected the site at Badachu in the suburbs of Beijing. The sanatorium was built as an ancient-style building. It was under the leadership and management of the Central Committee of the Communist Youth League.

In November 1954, the sanatorium was put into use. Its original name was "Asian Students Sanatorium". In the two years since its establishment, the sanatorium received 796 students from nine countries, including India, Indonesia, Nepal, Pakistan, Iraq, North Korea, Vietnam, Mongolia, and China. By November 1956, 574 students had recovered and been discharged. In the same year, Asian Students Sanatorium was renamed the "Asian-African Students' Sanatorium" according to the resolution of the Fourth World Student Congress.

This sanatorium adopted advanced medical methods such as air, chemical, atrophic, physical, and nutritional treatments. In order to accommodate the customs of different ethnic groups, three kitchens were set up: Chinese, Western, and halal. There was also a library and a recreation room.

In April 1969, the staff of the Asian-African Students' Sanatorium moved to Huanghu Farm in Huangchuan County with the Central Committee of the Communist Youth League and were organized into the 11th Company of the May 7th Cadre School of the Central Committee of the Communist Youth League. The original site became the Beijing Military Region Guesthouse. The Asian and African Students' Sanatorium was located at "Bawangtai" on Huanghu Farm, where two rows of more than 20 red brick and tile houses were built. During its time in Huanghu, the sanatorium was mainly responsible for the medical and health care of the May Seventh Cadre School and for participating in seasonal production labor, as well as training barefoot doctors in the surrounding three counties.

After the "Lin Biao incident" in 1971, Li Desheng, the commander of the Beijing Military Region, decided to concentrate all the staff of the Lin Office at the sanatorium site for isolation and investigation for many years.

In April 1973, the Asian and African Students' Sanatorium withdrew from Huanghu Farm and returned to Beijing, becoming the last unit of the May Seventh Cadre School of the Central Committee of the Communist Youth League to return to Beijing.

In 1978, with the approval of the Central Committee, the sanatorium was closed, the tuberculosis prevention team was merged into the Beijing Tuberculosis Prevention and Treatment Institute, the site was transferred to the Chinese Academy of Medical Sciences, and it was converted into a Plastic Surgery Hospital. The Institute of Plastic Surgery was founded in the same year.

In 2017, the hospital was awarded the title of "National Model Unit of Spiritual Civilization".

In 2025, China's first-ever medical proof-of-concept center for plastic surgery was established in the hospital.

== Facilities ==
The Plastic Surgery Hospital covers an area of more than 100,000 square meters. There are 700 beds, 370 doctors and 373 nurses, serving over 360,000 outpatients and performing over 86,000 plastic, reconstructive, and cosmetic surgeries annually.

The hospital is China's earliest tertiary-level Class A specialized hospital for plastic surgery and a national leader in medical treatment, teaching, and scientific research in its fields. It is also the publisher and editorial unit of the Chinese Journal of Plastic Surgery. The hospital prioritizes surgery for congenital malformations, including microtia and cleft lip and palate, and has established more than 20 specialized medical centers, including those for scar and wound treatment, cleft lip and palate treatment, craniofacial surgery, and external ear reconstruction.

== See also ==
- Cosmetic surgery in China
- Chinese Academy of Medical Sciences
- List of hospitals in China
