= Karel Rüütli =

Estonian politician (born 1978)

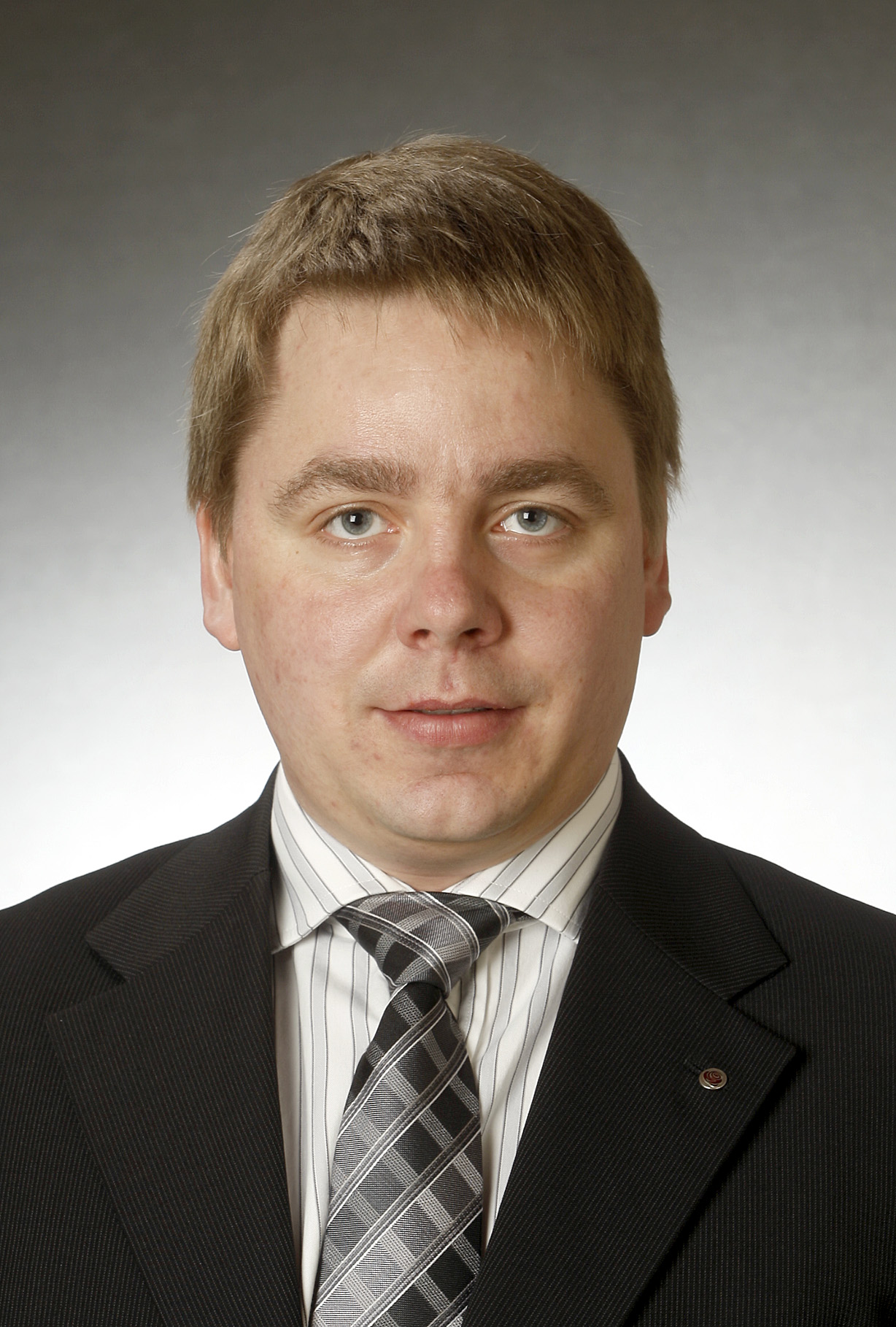
Karel Rüütli (2011)

Karel Rüütli (born 25 December 1978, in Valga) was Chairman of the Estonian People's Union (Eestimaa Rahvaliit) and also leader of the Estonian People's Union faction in the Estonian Parliament. He left the ERL and joined the Social Democratic Party of Estonia on 14 June 2010.

== Education ==
Karel Rüütli acquired secondary education in Valga Gymnasium in 1997. Rüütli continued his studies in the Estonian University of Life Sciences (Eesti Maaülikool) in the Institute of Forestry and Rural Engineering and graduated 2004. He wrote his candidate thesis on the topic of forestry politics in Estonia.

== Career ==
From 2005 to 2007 Karel Rüütli has been Political Advisor in the Ministry of the Environment. He was elected to the Municipal Council of the City of Tartu from 2005 to 2007. He has been a member of the Council of Association of Estonian Cities. In April 2007, he was elected to the National Parliament.

He has been member of supervisory boards of several state or municipal owned companies: Estonian Lottery (2003–2007), National Forest Administration (2005–2007) and Tartu Waterworks (2005–2007).

At the moment he is member of the Estonian Parliament (Riigikogu) and the Leader of the Parliamentary Fraction. He specialized in issues of educational affairs and civil control of police, prosecution and intelligent agencies being member of the Cultural Affairs Committee and the Security Authorities Surveillance Select Committee.

== Party-political career ==
Karel Rüütli has been a member of Estonian People's Union from 2001 and a member of the party's executive committee from 2002.

From 2001 to 2003 he was the chairperson of the party's Youth Organisation (Rahvaliidu Noored). He has been from 2005 to 2008 the vice-chairperson of the party council.

From November 2008 to 28 May 2010 he was the chairperson of the party being the youngest chairs of parties represented in the national parliament. He left the ERL with Jaanus Marrandi, Jaan Õunapuu and Rein Randverd on 14 June 2010 and they subsequently joined the Social Democratic Party of Estonia after the failed merger attempt with Social Democrats.

== Community and Society ==
Karel is a member of Estonian Society of Foresters (Eesti Metsaüliõpilaste Selts), the Alumni Club of the Federation of Estonian Student Unions, Alumni Association of Valga Gymnasium and a member of Supervisory Board of Heino Teder Forestry Farm Training Centre Foundation.

Karel started his active social life in the secondary school being one of the leaders of the student council.

From 2000 to 2002 he was vice-chair of the executive board of the Student Union of the Estonian University of Life Sciences, also a member of the university council and a member of the Council of the Federation of Estonian Student Unions. In 2002 he was one of the founders of the Foundation of the Student Union of Estonian University of Life Sciences.

== Personal life ==
Karel Rüütli lives together with his fiancée Merylin and their two sons - Karl-Erik and Hans-Robert.

== Sources ==
- Official Webpage of Estonian Parliament about Karel Rüütli
- Official Webpages of the People´s Union of Estonia
- Official Webpage of Karel Rüütli
