= Confédération des jeunes chercheurs =

The Confédération des jeunes chercheurs (often abbreviated CJC) (English name: French Confederation of Early Career Researchers) is a French not-for-profit organization which goal is to represent French Doctoral candidates and Early-stage Researchers (Doctorants/Chercheurs en début de Carrière) and new doctorate holders at the French and European levels (for the latter, see Eurodoc). Established March 2, 1996, the CJC is an advocator on all questions related to research, higher education and doctoral training. The CJC members are first and foremost French local associations of early career researchers (currently approx. 15 members). They define the working priorities of the confederation and take forward its thinking.
