= National Postgraduate Committee =

Former British charitable organization

The National Postgraduate Committee of the United Kingdom (NPC) was a charitable organisation which represented postgraduates at UK universities. In 2009 it voted to dissolve itself and merge with the National Union of Students.

NPC was formed by affiliation from student representative bodies across the United Kingdom and seeks, in the words of its constitution, "to advance, in the public interest, the education of postgraduate students within the United Kingdom" through representation, lobbying, contribution to public policy debate, initiating communication between relevant parties and bringing key issues and potential solutions to wider audiences.

The organisation's motion to dissolve and engage in merger talks with NUS cited several reasons for the organisation's winding up, including "the increased capacity of the NUS with regard to that organisation's ability to meet the needs of postgraduates, and that likelihood that this capacity will increase." Other organisations cited additional reasons which led to NPC's dissolution, including financial and management difficulties.

== History ==
The NPC was formed in the 1980s as a network of officers. In 1990, recognising that at that time the National Union of Students (NUS) was not well set up to represent the particular issues postgraduate faced nationally it held its first conference at the University of Cambridge; Chris Whitty of Wolfson College, Oxford (later Chief Medical Officer for England) was elected chair. Following this a growth in activity ensued, leading to the adoption of formal structures. It adopted its first constitution in 1992, the same year that it created the full-time post of General Secretary and began its affiliation scheme. The NPC sought charitable status for a number of years and obtained this in 2002, following the passing of a new constitution.

Past General Secretaries:

- James Irvine from 1 October 1992 until 30 September 1993
- Crispin Allard from 1 October 1993 until 30 September 1994
- Jamie Darwen from 1 October 1994 until 30 September 1995
- Ewan Gillon from 1 October 1995 until 30 September 1996
- John Gray from 1 October 1996 until 30 September 1997
- Martin Gough from 1 October 1997 until 30 September 1998
- Jeremy Hoad from 1 October 1998 until 30 September 2000
- James Groves from 1 October 2000 until 30 September 2002
- Tim Brown from 1 October 2002 until 30 September 2004
- Jim Ewing from 1 October 2004 until 30 September 2005
- Simon Felton from 1 October 2005 until 30 September 2007
- Duncan Connors from 1 October 2007 until 30 September 2008
- Matt Gayle from 1 October 2008 until 11 September 2009

== Output ==
The majority of NPC's work was conducted by the General Secretary who worked full-time; there were 14 other voluntary officers on the executive to assist in the general running of the organisation. Income was derived from affiliation fees by several student representative bodies in the United Kingdom along with a small number of donations.

The Journal of Graduate Education (ISSN 1354-0653) was an academic journal established by the NPC in 1994. It was incorporated with the now-defunct International Journal of Graduate Education in 2008.

== See also ==
- National Union of Students - Representative body of postgraduate students in the UK
- Associação dos Bolseiros de Investigação Cientifica - The equivalent organisation in Portugal.
- Eurodoc - Eurodoc, the European wide federation of national postgraduate representative bodies.
- Council of Australian Postgraduate Associations - Equivalent organisation in Australia.
