= Associação dos Bolseiros de Investigação Científica =

Portuguese association involving grant-holding researchers

Association of Scientific Research Grant Holders
- Abbreviation: ABIC
- Formation: 2003
- Type: Non-profit organization
- Headquarters: Lisbon, Portugal
- Location: Rua Ferreira Lapa, n.º 32, 3.º Dto 1150-158 Lisboa
- Origins: Plataforma de Bolseiros de Investigação Científica (PBIC)
- Members: 420 members (Jan 2007)
- Official language: Portuguese
- President: Nuno Peixinho (2019–2021) Bárbara Carvalho (2021-2023); Sofia Lisboa (2023-2026) João Neves (March 2026-Present)
- Website: https://www.abic-online.org

ABIC - Association of Scientific Research Grant Holders is the Portuguese association of grant-holding researchers. ABIC was established in 2003 and represents early stage researchers, such as doctoral students, and post-doc fellows as well as researchers who are not included is these two groups but are grant-holders. This association originated in a group of researchers who gathered in 2001 to write a document to be presented to all the stakeholders involved with research in Portugal. This group called “plataforma de bolseiros de investigação científica (PBIC)” evolved into ABIC. ABIC's main activities have been in the following areas: i) to alert the funding agencies in Portugal such as AI^2 (https://ai2participa.pt/) (previous FCT) that the grant-holding researchers should have social benefits and pension schemes as recommended in The European Charter for Researchers ; ii) to urge the government to open the positions available in the public sector and not use grant-holders researchers as cheap labour in Portugal; iii) to persuade the government to deliver policies which are able to create scientific jobs, both in the public and private sector.

ABIC is member of Eurodoc, the European federation of national organisations of young researchers. ABIC is also a member of the World Federation of Scientific Workers (website)

The most active ABIC on-line resource is the bulletin board (forum.bolseiros.org) written in Portuguese but, in general, young Portuguese read and write English fluently.

== ABIC structure ==
Direction board

General Assembly board

Council Tax board

== Portuguese local sections ==
List of local sections:

- Minho
- Porto
- Aveiro
- Coimbra
- Évora
- NOVA FCT
- FCSH
- FCUL
- FLUL
- INSA
- ISA
- ISCTE
- IST
- UBI
- Others

== Official pages ==
- Website
- Instagram
- Facebook
- X (Twitter)
- YouTube

== See also ==
- Austrian National Union of Students - Equivalent organisation in Austria.
- Confédération des jeunes chercheurs - Equivalent organisation in France.
- National Postgraduate Committee - Equivalent organisation in the United Kingdom.
- EURODOC European Council of doctoral candidates and junior researchers. ABIC is a member.
