= Gesthuizen =

Gesthuizen is a Dutch surname. Notable people with the surname include:

- François Gesthuizen (born 1972), Dutch footballer and manager
- Sharon Gesthuizen (born 1976), Dutch politician
