= International Union of Students =

World non-partisan forum

- Abbreviation: IUS
- Successor: Global Student Forum
- Formation: 1946
- Purpose: Association of World's Students' Organizations
- Headquarters: Czechoslovakia
- Location: Prague
- Region served: Worldwide
- Members: 155 Students' Organizations from 112 Countries
- Official language: English, French, Spanish
- General Secretary: Frage Sherif
- Treasurer: Liz Carlyle
- Advisory Council Chief: Akhil Ennamsetty
- Key people: Ingo Jaeger, Maria Lucia, Syed Mustaffa Ali
- Main organ: Executive Secretariat
- Affiliations: UNESCO, ECOSOC
- Remarks: Ideologically influenced by Left-Wing, Communist, Socialist and Marxist views.
- Formerly called: International Students' Council

The International Union of Students (IUS) was a worldwide nonpartisan association of university student organizations.

The IUS was the umbrella organization for 155 such students' organizations across 112 countries and territories representing approximately 25 million students. This was recognised by the United Nations granting the IUS a consultative status in UNESCO. The primary aim of the IUS was to defend the rights and interests of students to promote improvement in their welfare and standard of education and to prepare them for their tasks as democratic citizens. It collapsed in the 2000s due to an unreliable membership system and a lack of grassroots engagement.

== Aim and work areas ==
The aims of the IUS were spelled out in the 1946 preamble to the organization's Constitution:

The purpose of the International Union of Students, which is founded upon the representative student organizations of different countries, shall be to defend the rights and interests of students to promote improvement in their welfare and standard of education and to prepare them for their tasks as democratic citizens.

According to the IUS's entry in the UNESCO Non-Governmental Organization list, the priority work areas of the IUS were: "Exchange of information, defence of students' status, peace, environment, development, human rights".

== Activities ==
The IUS worked through:

- Issuing student statements
- Circular news letters and calls for action to members
- Celebration of International Students' Day on November 17
- Organizing student conferences

== Logo symbolism ==
The logo and flag of the IUS is a burning torch and an open book set against the red and blue outline of a stylized globe. It symbolizes youth's persistent quest for knowledge.

== History ==
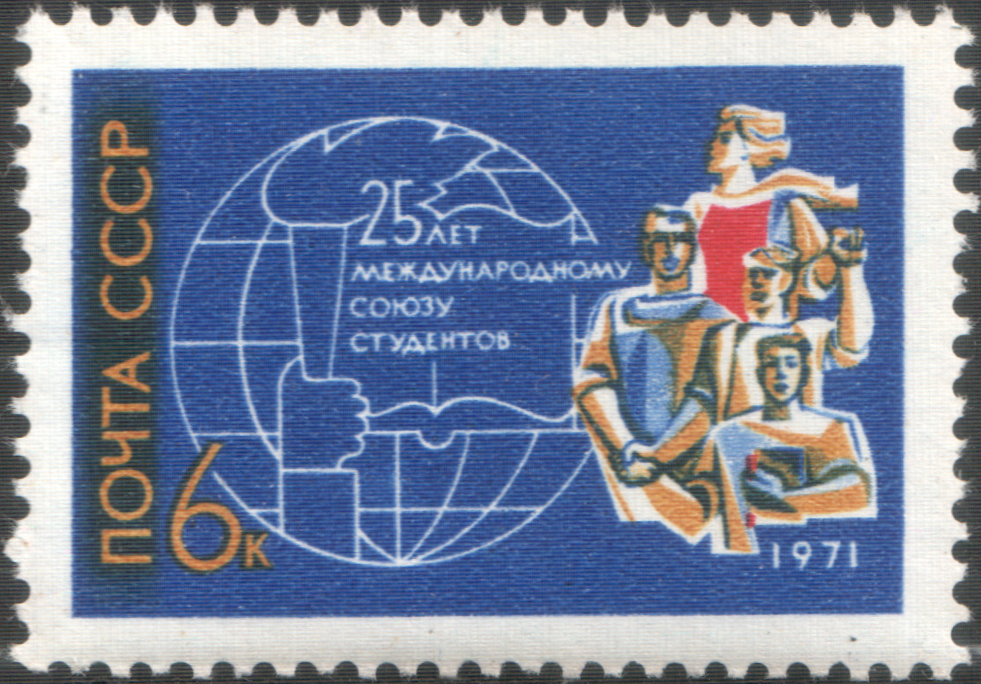
Stamp of the 25th anniversary of IUS in USSR

=== Early history 1946–1956 ===
The International Union of Students was founded in Prague on August 27, 1946. Student organizations from 62 countries participated in its founding envisioning a more inclusive successor to the short lived 1941-1944 International Council of Students (also known as the International Students' Council) which was set up on the initiative of the British National Union of Students to maintain open lines of communication with student organizations in allied countries during World War II.

From its earliest inception, the IUS was marked by a fundamental schism:

"The spirit of [post-war] co-operation and the desire to prevent a resurgence of fascism in Europe brought together otherwise divergent groups. The main divisions, evident even at the founding congress, were between the Communist student organizations, which gained control of the executive bodies of the IUS from the beginning, and the student unions from western Europe, many of which were primarily interested in preserving the idea of a non-political international agency which would provide concrete services to the students of various countries"

In response to the increasingly partisan Communist course of the IUS and the broad powers of its secretariat and executive committee to initiate new policy programmes on behalf of the members, several non-Communist members withdrew their membership in the following years. Following which the IUS also referred itself as Independent Federation of Left-Wing and Alternative Student Unions.

Consequently, 21 such break-away national students organizations met in Stockholm in 1950 to form the International Student Conference (ISC) as a nonpartisan rival organization to the pro-Communist IUS. Notable among these founders was the United States National Student Association (USNSA or NSA) though "Anglo-Saxons, Scandinavians and Dutch wielded the greatest influence [in the ISC]".

At the time of the formation of the ISC, the dominant view in later analyses is that the IUS had become Communist controlled to such a degree that it is often referred to as a Soviet Union Communist front organization with the IUS and ISC aligned along the Cold War fronts toward the Soviet Union and the United States of America respectively.

A dissenting view that the IUS was strongly influenced by socialism and communism but not de facto controlled by Soviet Communist interests, has also been expressed, however, by Trotskyist Lawrence Brammer:

"It is significant that several former IUS officers later became outspoken liberals in Czechoslovakia and in the French and Italian Communist Parties. The outward pro-Soviet orientation of the IUS often obscured real differences within the organization"

IUS activities in this period included Student Games held by the IUS Sports Council. The first such games were held in Paris in 1946 and were subsequently integrated into the World Youth Festivals (also known as World Festival of Youth and Students) which the IUS co-sponsored with the Communist oriented World Federation of Democratic Youth (WFDY).

Such festivals brought up to 30,000 youth and students together for a social, cultural and sporting event

=== IUS from 1956–1969 ===
From 1956 onwards, the IUS and ISC competed to attract student unions non-aligned in the Cold War sense. Focus was on Latin America, Asia and Africa and recruitment of member unions from here resulted in a broader political base for the IUS.

Activities in this period included among others regional student seminars, donation of duplication machines and cameras to help affiliates, the establishment of student Health Centres in India, international student conferences as well as the publication in German, Russian and Czech of the World Student News journal of the IUS, the Democratic Education journal of the IUS, and topical pamphlets concerning education. More spectacularly, the IUS continued to co-sponsor World Youth Festivals with the World Federation of Democratic Youth (WFDY).

It was well known from the outset that the IUS was funded by Soviet and Czech government contributions:

"The cost of international meetings, large-scale publications, and the other activities in which they engage, are beyond the financial resources of university students"

However, the IUS's inability to win leadership in left-wing student movements in Europe despite its many activities caused the Soviet Union to re-evaluate its support.

The major challenge for the IUS in this period turned out to be its preoccupation with an ideological agenda rather than a focus on actual student concerns and affairs. As a consequence of this stance, the organization became detached from its student base and was circumvented by grassroots movements in, e.g. the planning of international anti-war demonstrations in relation to the Vietnam War. The major achievements of the IUS in this period were therefore firstly helping create national student unions in developing countries and secondly aiding student union members with information and idea exchange.

The dissolution of the IUS's rival organization the International Student Conference (ISC) owing to lack of funds became a reality in 1969. The demise of the ISC were hastened by the 1967 revelation that the CIA had indirectly funded the ISC and recruited student representatives from the United States National Student Association (USNSA) to actively oppose Communism in the IUS. This undermined both the financial and student political support of the ISC leaving, once again, the IUS as the only worldwide student organization.

=== IUS from 1970–present ===
This period in IUS history is marked by the chairmanship of the same chairman from 1977 to 1986 under whom a flurry of international IUS activity took place in 1979.

The most significant event of the period for the IUS, however, was the turmoil the organization encountered after the 1989 - 1991 fall of Communism (see also World Federation of Democratic Youth) during which the IUS lost most of its funding. Additionally, in August 1991, the Czechoslovak Minister of the Interior decided to expel the IUS and other Communist front organizations from Czechoslovakia. The reasons given for the expulsion were close ties with the old Communist regime and abuse of tax privileges granted during the old Communist regime.

Despite the hardships caused by the changing power dynamics of the 1990s, the organization elected a new leadership at its 1992 Cyprus Congress and initiated structural changes of its Constitution to renew itself and evolve beyond its Communist past:

"At the 16th Congress of the International Union of Students (IUS), which took place in January 1992 in Larnaca, Cyprus, the organisation underwent major changes, including the development of a new constitution. These initiatives were adopted to establish the basis for a more democratic, representative, and independent international student organisation"

The new leadership and its successors continued to make press appearances in, e.g., relation to International Students' Day celebration in Dublin in 1994 and the 1998 UNESCO World Conference on Higher Education.

In August 2003, the International Union of Students marked a comeback by calling for a worldwide day of protest against the inclusion of Higher Education in the WTO's General Agreement on Trade in Services.

The IUS is still, however, struggling with its expulsion from its Prague headquarters as of October 2006:

"Most cold war institutions shriveled in the 1990s, along with their superpower backing. The big communist front outfits that fought propaganda wars, awash with cash and stuffed with spies, have fizzled away in a mixture of apathy and swindles. This week's court-enforced auction of a hulking concrete pile in the heart of Prague belonging to one of them, the International Union of Students, was halted amid squabbles among its dozens of creditors"

== Members ==
The IUS had the following members:

Country	Member	Membership
Afghanistan	Union of Afghan Youth	Consultative
Algeria	Union Nationale des Étudiants Algériens	Full
Argentina	Argentine University Federation	Full
Bahrain	National Union of Bahrain Students	Full
Bangladesh	Bangladesh Chhatra Maitri	Shared
Bangladesh	Bangladesh Chhatra League	Full
Bangladesh	Student Federation of Bangladesh	Shared
Bangladesh	Bangladesh Students' Union	Shared
Barbados	Guild of Undergraduates	Full
Belgium	Flemish Union of Students	Associate
Benin	Fédération Nationale des Étudiants du Bénin	Full
Bolivia	Confederacion Universitaria Boliviana	Full
Botswana	Botswana Student Council	Frozen
Brazil	National Union of Students	Full
Brazil	União Brasileira dos Estudantes Secundaristas	Consultative
Bulgaria	National Student Coordinating Center of Bulgaria	Full
Burkina Faso	Alliance Démocratique des Étudiants Pour le Développement du Burkina	Full
Burma	All Burma Federation of Student Unions	Full
Burundi	Jeunesse Révolutionnaire Rwagasore (Commission Estudiantine)	Frozen
Cambodia	Youth Association of Cambodia	Frozen
Cameroon	Union Nationale des Étudiants Socialistes du Kamerun	Full
Canada	Canadian Federation of Students	Full
Cape Verde	Juventude Africana Amilcar Cabral-Cabo Verde	Frozen
Chad	Union Générale des Étudiants et Stagiaires du Tchad	Full
Chile	Consejo Nacional de Federaciones de Estudiantes Chilenos	Frozen
Commonwealth of Independent States	Student Council of Associations and Unions of Higher Educational Institutions of the CIS	Consultative
Colombia	Union Nacional de Estudiantes Colombianos	Frozen
Comoros	Union Nationale de la Jeunesse et des Étudiants des Comores	Consultative
Congo, Rep.	Union Nationale des Étudiants Congolais	Full
Congo, Dem. Rep.	Étudiants Congolais Progressistes	Consultative
Costa Rica	Federación de Estudiantes de la Universidad de Costa Rica	Shared
Costa Rica	Federación de Estudiantes de la Universidad Nacional	Shared
Cuba	Federación Estudiantil Universitaria	Full
Cyprus	Pancyprian Federation of Students and Young Scientists	Full
Cyprus	Turkish-Cypriot Student Association	Consultative
Czechoslovakia	Czechoslovak Central Students' Council of the Socialist Youth Union	Full
Dominican Republic	Federación de Estudiantes Dominicanos	Full
Ecuador	Federación de Estudiantes Universitarios del Ecuador	Frozen
Ecuador	Federación de Estudiantes Politécnicos del Ecuador	Shared
Egypt	General Union of Students of the Arab Republic of Egypt	Frozen
Egypt	Union of Democratic Egyptian Youth (Student Section)	Shared
El Salvador	General de Estudiantes Universitarios Salvadoreños	Full
Eritrea	National Union of Eritrean Youth	Full
Fiji	University of the South Pacific Students Association	Full
France	Union Nationale des Étudiants de France	Shared
France	Union Nationale des Étudiants de France - Indépendante et Démocratique	Shared
Gambia	National Union of Gambian Students	Full
Germany	Freier Zusammenschluss von StudentInnenschaften	Full
Ghana	National Union of Ghana Students	Full
Guatemala	Asociación de Estudiantes Universitarios	Full
Guinea Bissau	African Youth Amílcar Cabral	Frozen
Guyana	Student Council of the Progressive Youth Organization	Frozen
Haiti	Fédération Nationale des Étudiants Haïtiens	Full
Honduras	Federación de Estudiantes Universitarios de Honduras	Frozen
India	All India Students Federation	Shared
India	Students' Federation of India	Shared
India	All-India Students Bloc	Shared
India	Radical Students Forum (RSF)	Shared
India	Chatra Janata Dal	Shared
Iran	Organization of Democratic Youth and Students of Iran	Frozen
Iraq	General Union of Students in Iraqi Republic	Shared
Iraq	National Union of Iraqi Students	Frozen
Jamaica	Jamaica Union of Tertiary Students	Full
Japan	All-Japan Federation of Student Unions	Full
Jordan	National Union of Jordan Students	Frozen
Kenya	Student Organization of Nairobi University	Frozen
Kiribati	Kiribati Students' Association	Consultative
North Korea	Korean Students Committee	Full
Kurdistan	Kurdish Students Society in Europe	Full
Kuwait	National Union of Kuwait Students	Frozen
Laos	Lao People's Revolutionary Youth Union	Consultative
Lebanon	Union Nationale des Étudiants de l'Université Libanaise	Frozen
Lesotho	Students' Representative Council	Full
Liberia	Liberia National Students Union	Full
Libyan Arab Jamahiriya	General Union of Great Jamahiriya Students	Full
Madagascar	Comité Démocratique des Jeunes et des Étudiants de Madagascar	Full
Madagascar	Organisation de la Jeunesse Révolutionnaire du Parti d'Avantgarde de la Révolution Malgache-Arema	Consultative
Malawi	Malawi Students Union of Lesoma	Full
Malta	Young Students' Movement	Consultative
Mauritius	Mauritius Union of Student Councils	Consultative
Mauritius	Council of Students & Youth Movements	Consultative
Mexico	Coordinadora Nacional de Estudiantes Mexicanos	Full
Mexico	Federación de Estudiantes de Guadalajara	Consultative
Mongolia	Union of Mongolian Students	Full
Morocco	Union Nationale des Étudiants du Maroc	Frozen
Morocco	Union Générale des Étudiants du Maroc	Consultative
Mozambique	Associaçao dos Estudantes Universitarios de Moçambique	Full
Mozambique	Mozambican Youth Organisation	Frozen
Namibia	Namibian National Student Organization	Full
Nepal	Nepal National Federation of Students	Shared
Nepal	All Nepal National Free Student Union	Shared
Nepal	Nepal Progressive Student Union	Frozen
Netherlands	Dutch Student Union	Full
Nicaragua	Unión Nacional de Estudiantes de Nicaragua	Full
Niger	Union des Scolaires Nigériens	Full
Nigeria	National Association of Nigerian Students	Full
Oman	National Union of Oman Students	Full
Pakistan	Democratic Students Federation	Frozen
Pakistan	Jeay Sindh Taraqui Pasand Student Federation	Consultative
Pakistan	Sindhi Shagird Tehreek	Consultative
Pakistan	Baloch Students Organization	Consultative
Palestine	General Union of Palestine Students	Full
Panama	Federación de Estudiantes de Panamá	Full
Papua New Guinea	National Union of Students	Full
Paraguay	Unión Estudiantil de Paraguay	Full
Peru	Federación de Estudiantes del Perú	Full
Philippines	National Union of Students of the Philippines	Full
Poland	Polish Students' Association	Full
Puerto Rico	Puerto Rico Pro-Independence University Federation	Full
Quebec	Mouvement des Étudiants et Étudiantes du Québec	Full
Romania	National Union of Independent Students	Full
Rwanda	Association Générale des Étudiants de l'Université Nationale du Ruanda	Full
Saint Lucia	Student Bureau (National Youth Council)	Full
Saint Vincent and the Grenadines	National Student Council	Full
Samoa	University of South Pacific-Alafuna Campus Students Association	Full
Sao Tome and Principe	Jeunesse du Mouvement de Libération de Sao Tomé et Principe	Full
Saudi Arabia	National Union of Students of Saudi Arabia	Consultative
Senegal	Union Démocratique des Étudiants de Dakar	Full
Seychelles	Seychelles People's Progressive Front (Youth League)	Frozen
Sierra Leone	National Union of Sierra Leone Students	Full
South Africa	South African Students Congress	Full
South Africa	Congress of South African Students	Consultative
Somalia	National Union of Somali Students	Full
Spain	Estudiantes Progresistas	Full
Spain	Unión de Estudiantes	Consultative
Spain	Coordinadora d'Estudiants d'Ensenyament Mitjà de Catalunya	Consultative
Sri Lanka	Sri Lanka National Union of Students	Shared
Sri Lanka	United National Party (Youth League)	Shared
Sudan	Democratic Front of Sudanese Students	Full
Suriname	Surinaamse Studenten Unie	Frozen
Switzerland	VSS-UNES-USU	Full
(Ba'athist Syria) Syria	National Union of Syrian Students	Full
Tanzania	National Union of Tanzanian Students	Frozen
Tanzania	Dar Es Salaam University Student Union	Consultative
Togo	Mouvement National des Étudiants et Stagiaires du Togo	Full
Trinidad and Tobago	Guild of Undergraduates	Full
Tunisia	Union Générale des Étudiants de Tunisie	Shared
Tunisia	Union Générale Tunisienne des Étudiants	Frozen
Uganda	Makerere Students Guild	Shared
Uganda	Uganda National Students Association	Shared
Uruguay	Asociación Social y Cultural de Estudiantes de la Enseñanza Pública (Federación de Estudiantes Universitarios del Uruguay)	Full
United States	United States Student Association	Full
Vanuatu	Vanuatu National Union of Students	Consultative
Venezuela	Federación de Estudiantes Universitarios de Venezuela	Consultative
Venezuela	Federación de Centros Universitarios	Consultative
Vietnam	Union Nationale des Étudiants du Vietnam	Full
Western Sahara	Sahrawi Youth Union (Sección Estudiantil)	Full
Yemen	Supreme Student Committee	Shared
Yemen	Central Council of Yemeni Students	Shared
Zambia	University of Zambia Student Union	Full
Zimbabwe	Zimbabwe National Students Union	Full

== See also ==
- Student activism
- World Federation of Democratic Youth
- World Peace Council
- International Association of Democratic Lawyers
- Women's International Democratic Federation
- World Federation of Trade Unions
