= Student Union AKKU =

Dutch student advocacy group

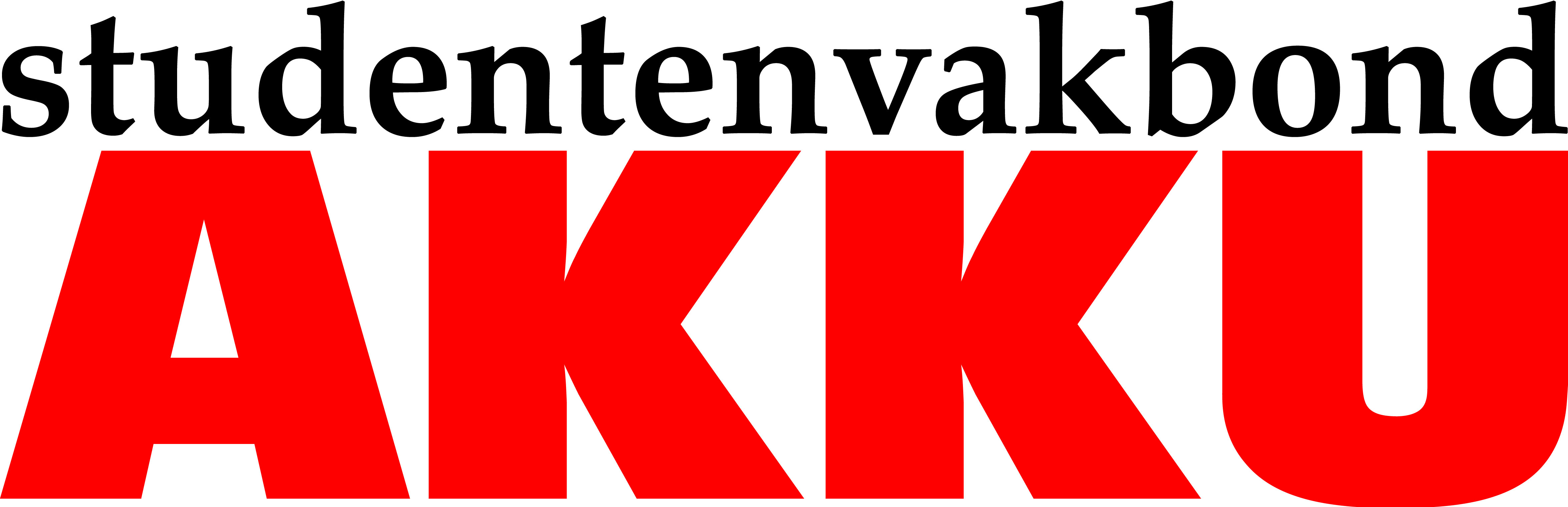
- Formation: 8 December 1981
- Type: NGO
- Purpose: advocacy
- Headquarters: Nijmegen, Netherlands
- Official language: Dutch
- Chair: Kayleigh Hofstede
- Affiliations: Dutch Student Union (LSVb)
- Website: studentenvakbondakku.nl
- Formerly called: Nijmeegse Studenten Vereniging Aktie Komitee Kritiese Universiteit

Student Union AKKU (Dutch: Studentenvakbond AKKU) is a Dutch advocacy group for students in Nijmegen, the Netherlands. AKKU was founded in 1981 and is affiliated with the Dutch Student Union. It advocates for the interests of students at a regional level and is active at the Radboud University Nijmegen and the HAN University of Applied Sciences.

In recent years, the student union has been advocating for a reform of the Dutch student loans and solutions to the student housing crisis in Nijmegen

== Members ==
Former (board) members of AKKU include politician Lisa Westerveld and activist Louis Sévèke.
