= Sharon Gesthuizen =

Dutch politician (born 1976)

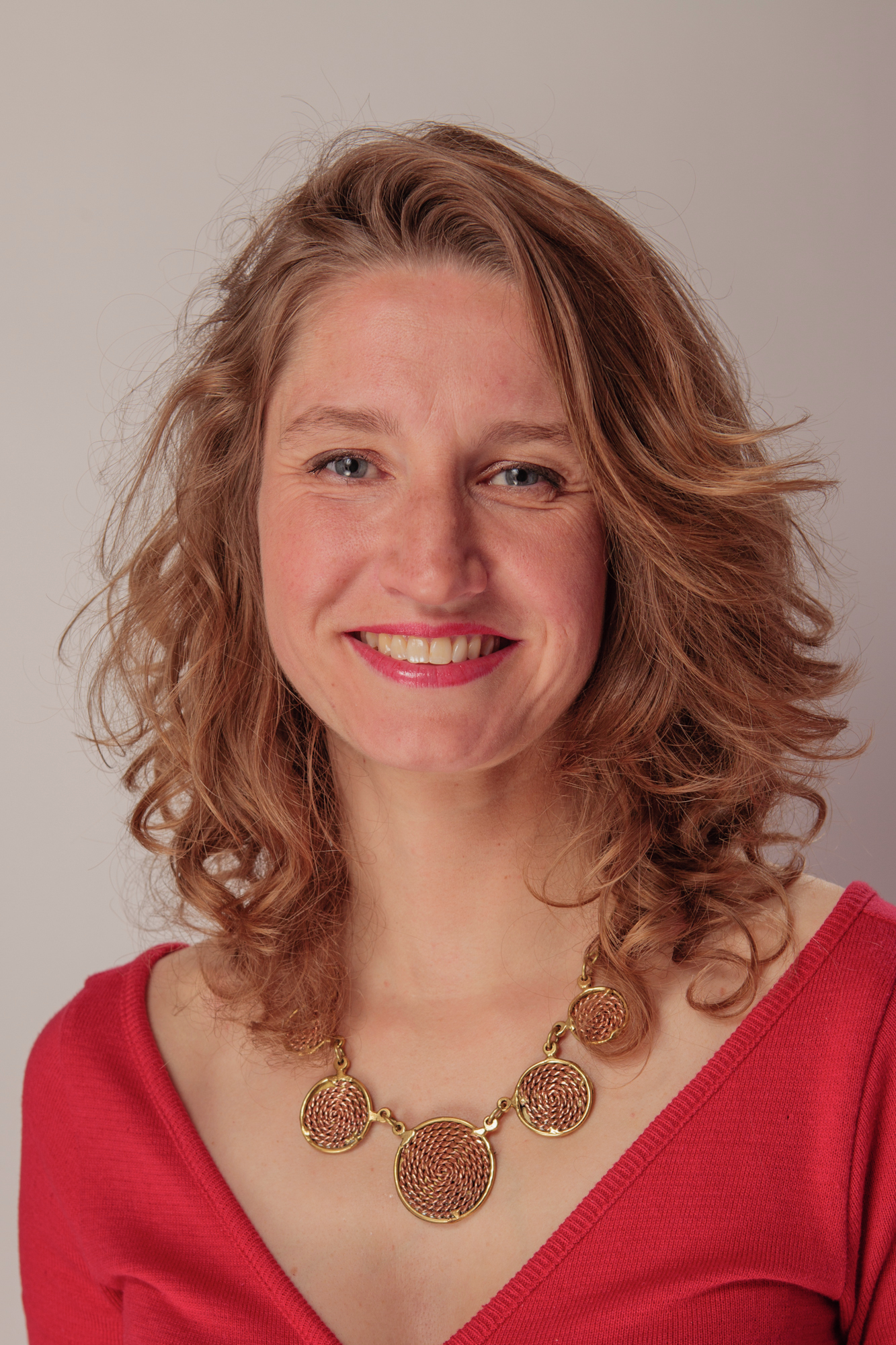
- Gesthuizen in 2012

Member of the House of Representatives
- In office 30 November 2006 – 22 March 2017

Personal details
- Born: 23 January 1976 (age 50) Nijmegen, Netherlands
- Party: GreenLeft
- Other party: SP (until 2018)

Sharon Maria Jacoba Gerarda Gesthuizen (born 23 January 1976) is a Dutch politician, businesswoman and trade unionist. As a member of the Socialist Party (Socialistische Partij) she was an MP between 30 November 2006 and 23 March 2017. She focused on matters of economic affairs, asylum and immigration policy, and judiciary.

From April to December 2006, she was a member of the municipal council of Haarlem.

In 2018, she left the Socialist Party in favor of GreenLeft because she didn't agree with the party's stance on migration.

Gesthuizen grew up in Millingen aan de Rijn and studied art at the Artez Institute of the Arts in Arnhem. From 2002 to 2003, she was a member of the Dutch Student Union (LSVb).
