= Lisa Westerveld =

Dutch politician (born 1981)

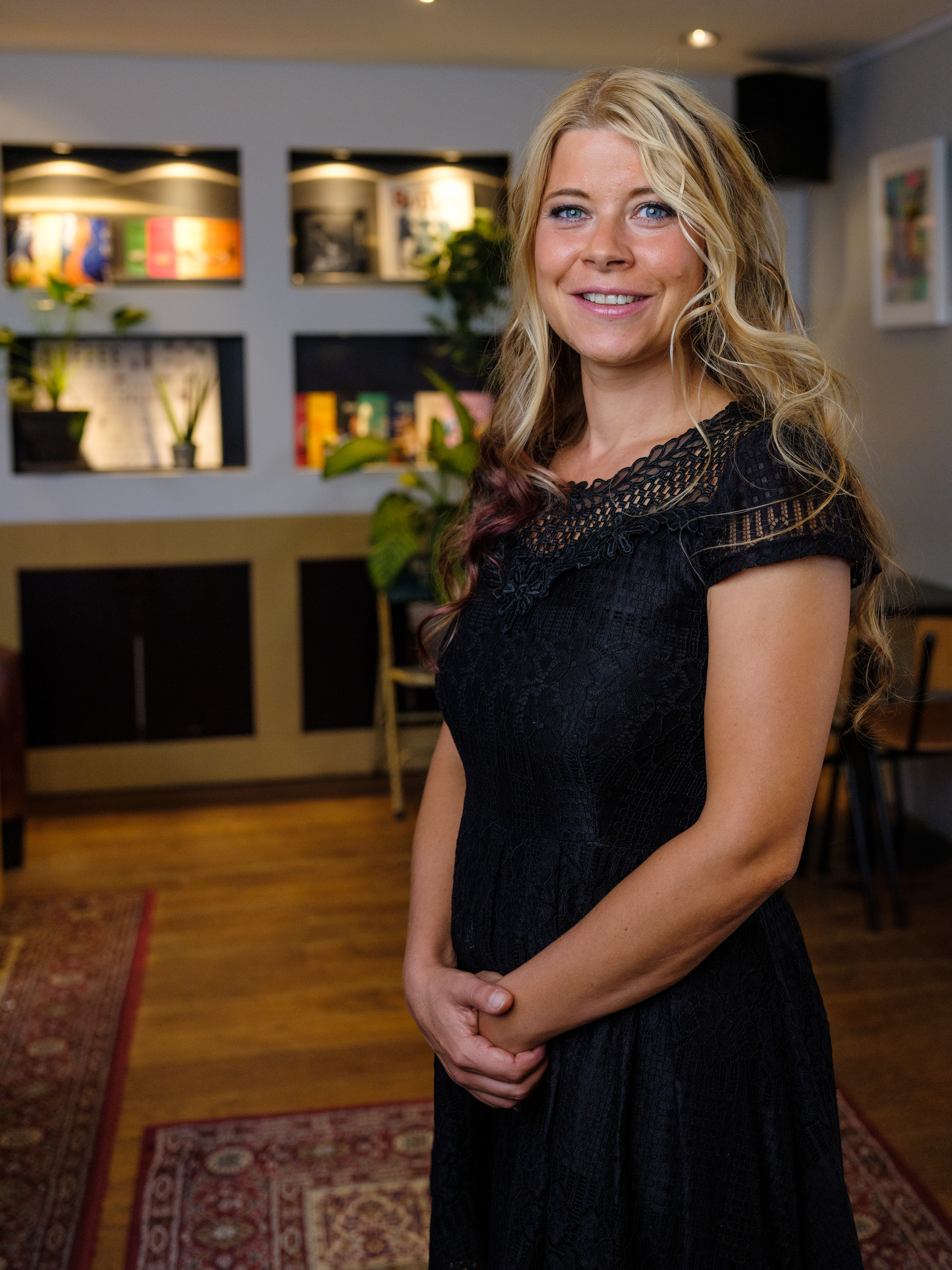

Member of House of Representatives
- Incumbent
- Assumed office 23 March 2017

Member of Nijmegen Municipal Council
- In office 27 March 2014 – March 2017

Personal details
- Born: Elisabeth Marij Westerveld; November 16, 1981 (age 44) Aalten, Netherlands
- Party: Groenlinks (2010–2026); PRO (since 2026)
- Other political affiliations: SP (until 2010)
- Education: Radboud University Nijmegen

Elisabeth Marij "Lisa" Westerveld (born 16 November 1981) is a Dutch politician serving as a member of the House of Representatives of the Netherlands since 2017 for Progressief Nederland (PRO), and previously for GroenLinks. Between 2014 and 2017 she was a member of the municipality council of Nijmegen.

== Early life and career ==
Westerveld was born and raised in Aalten. She is from a family that were loyal voters of the Christian Union. She attended Christelijk College Schaersvoorde when she was a teenager.

She moved to Nijmegen for university, where she studied philosophy at the Radboud University Nijmegen. From 2007 until 2009 she was chairwoman of the National Student Union (LSVb). In 2010 she graduated with a master's degree in political philosophy. After completing her studies she started to work as a spokesperson and political lobbyist for the General Education Union.

=== Politics ===
She was first a member of the SP. She became a member of Groenlinks after she stopped at the National student union in 2009. For the 2012 Dutch general election, she was placed 22nd on the party list and therefore wasn't able to get elected as Groenlinks only obtained four seats. In 2014 she got elected into the municipality council of Nijmegen, where she was placed second on the party list. She got the most votes of women candidates in Nijmegen in that election.

In 2017, Groenlinks won 14 seats in the House of Representatives. Westerveld was placed 14th on the party list which would initially be enough to be get a seat, but because a candidate placed 19th on the party list was elected with enough preference votes she almost lost the seat. Westerveld garnered 18.000 preference votes which was eventually enough to get a seat in the House of Representatives. In 2021 she was re-elected based on preferences votes again. Groenlinks won 8 seats but Westerveld was placed 10th on the party list, she got 33,172 preference votes was passed the threshold to get a seat. She received a third term in the November 2023 general election as part of the shared GroenLinks–PvdA list, and she became the party's spokesperson for culture, youth care, mental healthcare, homeless sheltering, disability policy, inclusion, racism, and discrimination.

== Electoral history ==
Electoral history of Lisa Westerveld
Year	Body	Party	Pos.	Votes	Result		Ref.
Year	Body	Party	Pos.	Votes	Party seats	Individual	Ref.
2012	House of Representatives	GroenLinks	17	1,458	4	Lost	
2014	Nijmegen Municipal Council	GroenLinks			8	Won	
2017	House of Representatives	GroenLinks	14	17,828	14	Won	
2018	Nijmegen Municipal Council	GroenLinks	50 (Note: Westerveld participated as a lijstduwer.)		11	Lost	
2019	Provincial Council of Gelderland	GroenLinks	50		6	Lost	
2021	House of Representatives	GroenLinks	10	33,172	8	Won (Note: Westerveld received enough preference votes to be elected despite her party's result.)	
2022	Nijmegen Municipal Council	GroenLinks	50	294	9	Lost	
2023	House of Representatives	GroenLinks–PvdA	5	141,064	25	Won	
2025	House of Representatives	GroenLinks–PvdA	5	120,186	20	Won	
