= National Union of Syrian Students =

Student organization in Ba'athist Syria

- الاتحاد الوطني لطلبة سورية
- Abbreviation: NUSS
- Formation: 23 April 1963
- Dissolved: 26 December 2024
- Headquarters: Damascus
- Region served: Ba'athist Syria
- Parent organization: Arab Socialist Ba'ath Party – Syria Region
- Website: Official website

The National Union of Syrian Students (Arabic: الاتحاد الوطني لطلبة سورية) was an organization of the Arab Socialist Ba'ath Party that included university and higher and intermediate institute students in Ba'athist Syria. It also encompassed Syrian students studying abroad who were mobilized by the union. Headquartered in Damascus, the union maintained branches both inside and outside Syria.

The activities of the union were suspended by the Ministry of Higher Education and Scientific Research in the Syrian caretaker government on 26 December 2024, shortly after the fall of the Assad regime.

== Establishment ==
The National Union of Syrian Students traces its origins to 1950, the year its first conference was held, and it was officially established on 23 April 1963.

The union operated without formal legal status until 1966, when Decree No. 130 officially recognized it. Its establishment was also confirmed by a resolution from the Ba'ath Party's Regional Command, designating it as the sole legitimate representative of Syrian students both within the country and abroad. However, a later decree (No. 23 of 1970) redefined its scope, limiting its activities to university students, while students below the university level fell under the jurisdiction of the Revolutionary Youth Union.

The union was a member of the International Union of Students.

== Structure ==
The latest legal framework for the National Union of Syrian Students was introduced in 2024 through Law No. 1, marking a significant update to its organizational structure. This came several months after a 2023 law establishing the National Student Loan Fund. While the union had long served as a student outreach arm of the ruling Ba'ath Party, the 2024 law presented an effort to redefine its formal structure under the appearance of institutional independence.

Under that latest legislation, the union was defined as a mass organization with independent legal, financial, and administrative identity—an assertion already reflected in its 2020 internal bylaws. This legal positioning aligned with attempts by Syrian authorities then to frame civil institutions as autonomous from the state, particularly in response to international scrutiny following the 2019 Caesar Act and the 2023 earthquake. By emphasizing formal independence, the Ba'athist regime sought to shield affiliated organizations from international sanctions and to shift blame for past abuses committed by individual members during the years of the Syrian revolution.

One of the notable structural changes included granting the union's president the authority to represent the organization in legal matters—a power not previously outlined in its internal regulations. Additionally, the law introduced a new oversight and inspection committee composed of five members, an entity not found in any prior versions of the union's bylaws.

Financially, the law consolidated all funding sources of the union, which were previously scattered across university regulations and internal procedures. It also repealed Decree No. 87 of 2010, which had entitled the Union to receive 0.5% of private university fees. The updated legislation increased this allocation to 1% and added another 1.5% from certain self-generated revenues of public universities. These changes granted the union a budget exceeding that of most professional syndicates, many of which relied solely on member dues. Previous decisions, such as the 2011 Higher Education Council Decision No. 274, had already granted the union 20% of revenues from state-run student facilities, higher than the 15% share allocated to the Teachers' Syndicate.

Additionally, Article 10 of the 2024 law introduced a new disciplinary clause absent from the union's existing bylaws at the time: membership is subject to termination for affiliation with any unlicensed political group or entity hostile to the state. This went further than the union's internal rules, which only cited opposition to its principles as grounds for expulsion. Despite the veneer of structural reform, the union, like other Ba'ath-affiliated youth bodies, continued to operate under the administrative supervision of the party's Central Youth Office.

== Membership ==
All Syrian university students were automatically registered as members of the National Union of Syrian Students during the rule of the Ba'athist regime.

== During the Syrian uprising ==
During the early years of the Syrian revolution, the National Union of Syrian Students played an active and often militarized role in suppressing dissent within universities. Response varied across campuses, in the University of Aleppo for example, security forces supplied student members with batons and whips to confront demonstrations and authorized them to confiscate IDs of protesting students for later arrest. This tactic reflected a broader alignment with the regime's security approach. Although some local party figures resisted violent crackdowns early on, changes in leadership soon led to more aggressive tactics. When the student movement in Aleppo proved resilient, the regime shifted strategies by forming the Ba'ath Brigades in 2012. This was a paramilitary group often composed of students. It served both a security function, using force to control campus activity, and a military one, participating directly in sieges and combat operations alongside government troops.

The union's involvement extended beyond organized battalions. In universities like Damascus, Tishreen, and al-Ba'ath, union-affiliated students were selectively armed based on loyalty. This loyalty was often determined by geography, sect, or previous service to intelligence agencies. These individuals targeted demonstrations and intimidated participants, sometimes using university dormitories to detain and torture students before handing them over to security services. Several detainees reportedly died under torture following such transfers.

In addition to these direct roles, union members managed campus security checkpoints and issued entry permissions, exercising wide authority over student movement. They were tasked with identifying, surveilling, and even arresting activists and professors critical of the regime. As a result, some faculty members were detained.

The union's militarized functions were institutionalized through its cooperation with the Ba'ath Brigades. These groups often shared office space and organized joint public activities, forming part of the regime's broader plan to control student life and public perception.

Politically, the union functioned as a key propaganda tool for the Assad regime. It helped organize public forums and campus events that promoted the regime's narrative, portraying the uprising as a foreign conspiracy. Union-affiliated events, both domestic and international, framed the conflict as a fight against terrorism and defended the regime's legitimacy.

Even as international sanctions targeted regime officials and certain figures from the union, such as Ammar Saati, the organization continued its work largely unimpeded. Other individuals involved in repression escaped penalties and remained active in diplomatic and academic arenas abroad.

Beyond the military and political sphere, the union also contributed to social initiatives that aligned with regime narratives. It signed agreements with pro-government institutions to promote the official version of events and organized volunteer programs in support of injured soldiers and their families.

== Suspension ==
Ba'athist rule in Syria ended with the fall of the Assad regime on 8 December 2024.

On 26 December 2024, the Ministry of Higher Education and Scientific Research in the Syrian caretaker government issued a decision to suspend the activities of the National Union of Syrian Students.

According to Decision No. 96, the suspension was implemented in accordance with the provisions of the Universities Organization Law and its executive regulations, and the requirements of the public interest.

== See also ==
- Revolutionary Youth Union
- Ba'ath Brigades
