= Cosmetic surgery in China =

Cosmetic surgery refers to the process, methods, and theories focusing on the enhancement of a person's physical appearance. In China, there are over 10 million people who have undergone cosmetic surgery, 8.5 million of them are under 30 years old. The intensifying fixation with physical beauty has escalated the demand for cosmetic surgery in recent years. The influence of Korean pop stars and other celebrities, and social media have significantly prompted young people to undergo these surgeries.

== Background ==
The roots of modern cosmetic surgery in China goes back to a plastic surgeon called Song Ruyao. As a medical student during the Second Sino-Japanese war, he was sent to the University of Pennsylvania in 1943 to study reconstructive plastic surgery. He is considered the founder of the field in China, which would later include cosmetic surgery.

Very few cosmetic surgeries took place before the Chinese Communist Revolution. During the Cultural Revolution, cosmetic surgeries were condemned as "bourgeois" for its focus on exterior form over practicality or function. In the 1980s, as cosmetic surgeries started becoming more acceptable, they also saw a rapid increase.

In 1994, cosmetic surgery was introduced in Beijing and since then, the market has significantly evolved. In 2004, a beauty pageant where only contestants who had gone under the knife could enter crowned China's first "Miss Plastic Surgery". In 2010, Beijing's China-Japan Friendship Hospital catered to a total of 20,000 to 30,000 people in its plastic surgery department, and the numbers consistently rose over the years.

== Statistics ==
Students make up the bulk of cosmetic surgery patients under 30 and estimates show that there are 20 million people in China who have had cosmetic surgery. In 2014 alone, over 7 million people, mostly young women, had cosmetic surgery, when the country's cosmetic surgery industry was valued at RMB400 billion. For every 100 buyers of medical beauty products, 64% per were from the post ’90s, followed by 19% of millennials. Reports also indicate an estimate of 100,000 cosmetic surgeons, of which only 10% were licensed. This signifies that 90% of facial surgery operations are carried out outside official medical systems.

== Market ==
China’s cosmetic surgery industry soared from RMB 87 billion in 2015 to RMB 176 billion in 2017 and currently continues to rise. It is the world’s 3rd largest cosmetic surgery market in 2018 and recent studies conducted by HSBC foresee an increase in its market size by 2019. Forecasts also reveal a boost in total spending of up to 800 million RMB ($122 million US) with the potential to reach 20.6 billion U.S. dollars by 2020.

== Drivers ==
The rise of the middle class in Chinese society is one reality behind China's escalating cosmetic surgery industry. The increase in the purchasing power of over 350 million Chinese raised the level of people's standards of living allowing them to aspire for other luxuries and life standards. Based on statistics culled from the Chinese Association of Plastics and Aesthetics in November 2015, the country's plastic surgery sector has grown rapidly with an annual growth rate of 30%. Likewise, it has changed the definition of plastic surgery. The practice is no longer confined to improving the looks of people with disfigured faces resulting from accidents and injuries; it now like getting the "icing on the cake" for inherently good looking people.

Another driver is pressure on social media. Beauty applications play an influential role in these “media demands” as many of these platforms put forward opportunities to alter or “improve” one's face. These application propose their own standard of beauty to users which all the more ignites the pressure that these people feel when they start comparing their ‘before and after’ photos.

The influence of Korean culture is another dynamic prompting the high number of Chinese citizens to avail of cosmetic surgery. This is due to the increasing popularity of the Korean Wave through Korean dramas and television shows which have become a hit in China. Since cosmetic surgery is common in Korea, entertainment personalities—with theirunbridled eyes, V-shaped jaw, and prominent cheekbones—have greatly influenced the Chinese people. These same Korean influences are found on the skin care market, where a perfect and white skin is a must for any woman wishing to convey a beautiful image of oneself.

== See also ==
- Plastic Surgery Hospital, Chinese Academy of Medical Sciences
