= IGLYO =

International LGBTQI youth organization

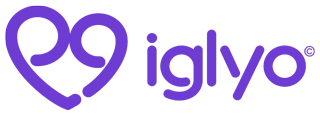
- Formation: 1984
- Type: Non-governmental organisation
- Headquarters: Brussels, Belgium
- Region served: Europe
- Members: 125 member organisations
- Official language: English
- Main organ: IGLYO General Assembly
- Affiliations: ESU, EYF
- Website: www.iglyo.com

The International Lesbian, Gay, Bisexual, Transgender, Queer & Intersex Youth and Student Organisation (IGLYO) is an international LGBTQI organisation that was created in 1984 in responde to the need for better cooperation among regional, local and national LGBTQI youth and student organisations. It advocates on behalf of its members to international bodies, institutions, and other organisations.

IGLYO is a membership-based umbrella organisation representing over 125 member organisations in more than 40 countries across Europe.

== Advocacy ==
IGLYO is an active member of the European Youth Forum, ILGA, ILGA-Europe, the Euromedplatform, and is an associate member organisation of the European Students' Union.

== Governance ==
The organization is led by an elected Executive Board who are mandated by the General Assembly, which is the highest decision making body of the organisation. Executive board members serve for a three-year mandate, must be nominated by one of IGLYO's member organisations, and be aged between 18 and 30 years old at the time of election. The Executive Board is supported by a secretariat in Brussels, Belgium, and is led by a chair.

== Member organisations ==
IGLYO comprises over 150 member organisations dedicated to LGBTQI youth and student rights in 40 countries across Europe, varying from youth advocacy organisations to students' unions and charitable organisations.
