= Vanuatu National Union of Students =

The Vanuatu National Union of Students was founded in 1980. VNUS holds consultative membership in the International Union of Students.
