= Dutch National Students Association =

Organisation in the Netherlands

The Dutch National Students Association (Dutch: Interstedelijk Studenten Overleg, ISO; lit. "Intercity Student Consultation") is the largest national student organization in the Netherlands and represents the general interests of more than 800,000 students at universities and universities of applied sciences.

ISO is the umbrella organization for all student participation councils and parties in the Netherlands. The ISO is a regular contact for the Ministry of Education, Culture and Science, political parties, and the umbrella organizations of universities (UNL) and universities of applied sciences (Vereniging Hogescholen).

The ISO was founded in 1973 by students from university councils at various institutions. These students felt the need to exchange information and experiences to strengthen their position at their own institutions. In 1973, the letters ISO stood for Interuniversity Student Consultation. Since 1995, the ISO has also represented students from universities of applied sciences, and the name was changed to Intercity Student Consultation.

ISO is a full member of the European Students' Union.

== History ==
The ISO was founded in 1973. Originally, the ISO began as a national umbrella organization for five university council factions from various cities in the Netherlands. It became clear that there was a need for national representation of student interests, particularly regarding political relations. Each student city usually has several university council factions and a student union. These student factions and unions felt the need to discuss certain issues with fellow student officials from other cities. To meet this need, the ISO was established. The ISO then expanded rapidly and, until 1995, represented students from across the Netherlands.

=== Expansion to higher professional education ===
In 1995, the ISO changed its name from the Interuniversity Student Consultation to the Intercity Student Consultation. With this name change, the ISO had a very clear goal in mind: to ensure that students in higher professional education (hbo) in the Netherlands were also represented nationally. The ISO now also has a large number of member organizations within higher professional education (HBO).

In addition, the ISO works closely with national student organizations such as the National Chamber of Associations, Studenten Sport Nederland, AIESEC, Integrand, UniPartners, and Erasmus Student Network.

== Member organizations ==
ISO members are member organizations that represent the interests of students at their university or university of applied sciences at the local level. These member organizations are often represented on their institution's university council or central participation council (CMR). Together, the member organizations form the ISO General Assembly (GA). The GA is the highest body of ISO. All member organizations have voting rights and jointly determine ISO policy.

=== University member organizations ===
Name	City	Educational institution
Academic Affairs Council Roosevelt Academy	Middelburg	Roosevelt Academy
University Council EUR	Rotterdam	Erasmus University Rotterdam
Lijst Calimero	Groningen	University of Groningen
Central Student Council UvA	Amsterdam	University of Amsterdam
MSRP DOPE	Maastricht	Maastricht University
Front faction	Tilburg	Tilburg University
Group one	Eindhoven	Eindhoven University of Technology
ORAS	Delft	Delft University of Technology
SAM	Tilburg	Tilburg University
SOG	Groningen	University of Groningen
Student Council Open University	-	Open University
USR Radboud University	Nijmegen	Radboud University
Utrecht University Council	Utrecht	Utrecht University
Ureka	Enschede	University of Twente
VeSte	Wageningen	Wageningen University & Research
USR Vrije Universiteit	Amsterdam	Vrije Universiteit
List Beta	Delft	Delft University of Technology
Lijst Vooruitstrevende Student	Leiden	Leiden University
USR University for Humanistic Studies	Utrecht	University for Humanistic Studies
The Ambitious Student (DAS)	Eindhoven	Eindhoven University of Technology
The Ambitious Student (DAS)	Enschede	University of Twente

=== University of Applied Sciences member organizations ===
Name	City	Educational institution
CMR Avans	Breda / 's-Hertogenbosch / Roosendaal / Tilburg	Avans University of Applied Sciences
Student Council of the CHE University of Applied Sciences	Ede	Christian University of Applied Sciences Ede
CMR HAN	Arnhem / Nijmegen	HAN University of Applied Sciences
CMR HvA	Amsterdam	Amsterdam University of Applied Sciences
CMR Fontys	's-Hertogenbosch / Eindhoven / Sittard / Tilburg / Utrecht / Veghel / Venlo	Fontys University of Applied Sciences
HMR InHolland	Alkmaar / Amsterdam / Delft / The Hague / Diemen / Dordrecht / Haarlem / Rotterdam	InHolland University of Applied Sciences
Hanze Student Interests Association	Groningen	Hanze University of Applied Sciences Groningen
The Hague University of Applied Sciences Council of Applied Sciences	The Hague	The Hague University of Applied Sciences
SR University of Applied Sciences Leiden	Leiden	Leiden University of Applied Sciences
CMR Rotterdam	Rotterdam	Rotterdam University of Applied Sciences
CMR Saxion University of Applied Sciences	Enschede / Deventer / Apeldoorn	Saxion
CMR NHL Stenden University of Applied Sciences	Leeuwarden / Emmen / Terschelling / Groningen / Meppel	Stenden University of Applied Sciences
CMR Windesheim University of Applied Sciences	Zwolle / Almere	Windesheim University of Applied Sciences
SR University of Applied Sciences Zeeland	Vlissingen / Middelburg	HZ University of Applied Sciences
List STRONG	Groningen	Hanze University of Applied Sciences Groningen
CMR Zuyd University of Applied Sciences	Heerlen	Zuyd University of Applied Sciences
Thomas More University Council	Rotterdam	Thomas More University of Applied Sciences
CMR Breda University of Applied Sciences	Breda	Breda University of Applied Sciences

=== Aspiring member organizations ===
Name	City	Educational institution
Utrecht University of Applied Sciences Council of University of Applied Sciences	Utrecht	Utrecht University of Applied Sciences
