= National Association of Graduate-Professional Students =

- Abbreviation: NAGPS
- Founded: 1986
- Purpose: Representing the interests of graduate & professional students in public and private universities at local, state, and national levels
- Location: Washington, D.C.
- President: Ludwig Zhao
- Vice President: Alex Seto
- Website: www.nagps.org

The National Association of Graduate-Professional Students (NAGPS) represents postgraduates at US universities. It was formed in 1986 and held the first national conference in 1987. It is formed by affiliation from student representative bodies across the United States and serves as "the umbrella organization representing all the graduate and professional students in the country", through representation, lobbying, contribution to public policy debate, initiating communication between relevant parties and bringing key issues and potential solutions to wider audiences.

== History ==
The idea of a national graduate student association was discussed by graduate students from four schools attending the First National Teaching Assistant Training Conference at Ohio State University in the spring of 1986. This group called the first national meeting in March 1987 at Washington State University. The group became the National Association of Graduate-Professional Students (NAGPS) at this meeting. A conference coordinator, information exchange coordinator, and six regional coordinators were selected. Since then, the NAGPS has developed a legislative and advocacy platform, hosts conferences and events annually, and provides services to members. Each year the NAGPS advocates its legislative priorities to federal policymakers on behalf of its constituents. The association's 30th Anniversary National Conference was hosted at Stony Brook University in November 2016.

== Governance ==
The NAGPS is governed by a National Board of Directors, and five Regional Boards of Directors.

National Board of Directors

The National Board of Directors is composed of an Executive Committee, Advocacy Board, and Outreach Board.

The Executive Committee consists of the President & CEO, Vice President, Director of Finance & CFO, Director of Communications & CCO, Director of Administration & CIO, Director of Legislative Affairs, Director of Outreach, Director of Relations, and the Immediate Past President.

The Advocacy Board consists of a Director of Social Justice Concerns, Director of International Student Concerns, and a Director of Employment Concerns.

Each of the five Regional Chairs has a seat on the National Board of Directors. The Outreach Board Consists of the Northeast Regional Chair, Southeast Regional Chair, South Central Regional Chair, West Regional Chair, and Midwest Regional Chair.

Regional Board of Directors

The regional boards of the NAGPS are divided by Northeast Region, Southeast Region, South Central Region, West Region, and Midwest Region. The location of a university determines which region it is a member of. Each region has a Regional Chair, who subsequently sits on the National Board of Directors as a voting member. The regions consist of a Chair, Vice Chair, Director of Outreach, Director of Communications, Director of Legislative Affairs, Director of Employment Concerns, Director of Social Justice Concerns, and Director of International Student Concerns.

== Conferences and events ==
The NAGPS hosts conferences and summits each year. The National Conference is the Association's flagship event. The National Conference is where the association's elections are held, and where their advocacy and legislative platforms are decided. The National Conference consists of presentations, guest speakers, entertainment, and networking opportunities.

In March and September, the NAGPS hosts its Spring and Fall Advocacy Summits and Legislative Action Days. The Advocacy Summit is a two day seminar, and Legislative Action Days are when attendees meet with policy makers on Capitol Hill.

During the Summer, the NAGPS hosts its Leadership Summit. The Leadership Summit is designed to train newly elected leaders to best serve their constituents at their home universities. Additionally, each of the five regional boards hosts a regional conference. Like the National Conference, this is where the regional membership gathers to decide on regional business.

== Legislative and advocacy platforms ==
Organizing its issue focus areas in workplace, campus, and international concerns, NAGPS advocates for higher education policy issues. These include open access for federally funded research, higher education funding, the reunification of student loan interest rates, international student visa reform, and policies aimed at deterring sexual assault on college campuses.

Advocacy campaigns established by the NAGPS include Fall and Spring Legislative Action Days, national Call Congress Campaigns, the Grads Have Debt 2 campaign, and campaigns advocating for the domestic renewal of international student F1 visas.

== Leadership ==
Past leadership

2019 National Board of Directors:

- President & CEO - Rio De Leon
- Vice President - Brad Sommer
- Director of Finance & CFO - Paul Welfer
- Director of Communications & CCO - Joseph Verado
- Director of Administration & CIO - Kendall Scarlett
- Director of Outreach - Michael Fiorini
- Director of External Affairs - Kristofferson Culmer
- Director of Legislative Affairs - Kaylynne Glover
- Director of Social Justice Concerns - James Diloretto-Hill
- Director of International Student Concerns - Fang Zhang
- Director of Employment Concerns - Jon Bomar
- Northeast Regional Director - B.J. Courville
- Southeast Regional Director - Judith Rivera
- South Central Regional Director - Jesse Wyatt
- Western Regional Director - Allie York
- Midwest Regional Director - Stephen Post

2017 National Board of Directors:

- President & CEO - Sam Leitermann-Long
- Vice President - Joseph Verardo
- Director of Finance & CFO - Damon Chambers
- Director of Communications & CCO - Jessica Schnaiter-Brasche
- Director of Administration & CIO - Jennifer Johnson
- Director of Outreach - Alex Howe
- Director of Relations - Alan Zhang
- Director of Legislative Affairs - Samantha Hernandez
- Social Justice Concerns Advocate - Derrick Taylor
- International Student Concerns Advocate - Surya D. Aggarwal
- Northeast Regional Chair - Olumayokun Odukale
- Southeast Regional Chair - Dwayne Johnson
- South Central Regional Chair - Kendall Scarlett
- Western Regional Chair - Prajwal Paudyal
- Midwest Regional Chair - Christina Collins

2016 National Board of Directors:

- President & CEO - Kristofferson Culmer
- Vice President - Scout Johnson
- Director of Finance & CFO - Joseph Verardo
- Director of Communications & CCO - Melanie Thornton
- Director of Administration & CIO - Denisha Griffey
- Director of Outreach - Dwayne Johnson
- Director of Legislative Affairs - Kathryn Harris
- Social Justice Concerns Advocate - Sam Leitermann-Long
- International Student Concerns Advocate - Samaneh Mesbahi
- Employment Concerns Advocate - Alex Howe
- Northeast Regional Chair - Daniel Gingerich
- Southeast Regional Chair - Andrew George
- South Central Regional Chair - Jackie Gamboa
- Western Regional Chair - Anthony Hessel
- Midwest Regional Chair - Brandon Creagan

== Current efforts ==
Leadership

Through annual national and regional conferences, NAGPS organizes graduate and professional students and organizations.

Research

The 2000 National Doctoral Program Survey funded by the Alfred P. Sloan Foundation gathered information on the educational experiences and outcome of nearly 33,000 in the U.S. and Canada.

Advocacy

Members of Congress consult NAGPS regularly. NAGPS actively works to preserve and expand federal student aid and other governmental programs and policies that benefit graduate and professional students. NAGPS sponsors Legislative Action Days each February and October. NAGPS organizes students to address graduate & professional concerns to their members on Capitol Hill during Legislative Action Days.

Discounts

NAGPS provides discounts and services to members. This includes discounts on health and auto insurance, periodicals, research resources, travel services, among others.

Awareness

NAGPS media relations have promoted the image of graduate students throughout the United States, via mainstream and campus media. Each April, NAGPS sponsors Graduate & Professional Student Appreciation Week in cooperation with sister organizations in Canada, Australia, Russia and the United Kingdom.
