= National Union of Students of Saudi Arabia =

The National Union of Students of Saudi Arabia was founded in 1977. The organization was banned in Saudi Arabia, and functioned in exile in Syria. NUSSA held consultative membership in the International Union of Students.
