= European Pharmaceutical Students' Association =

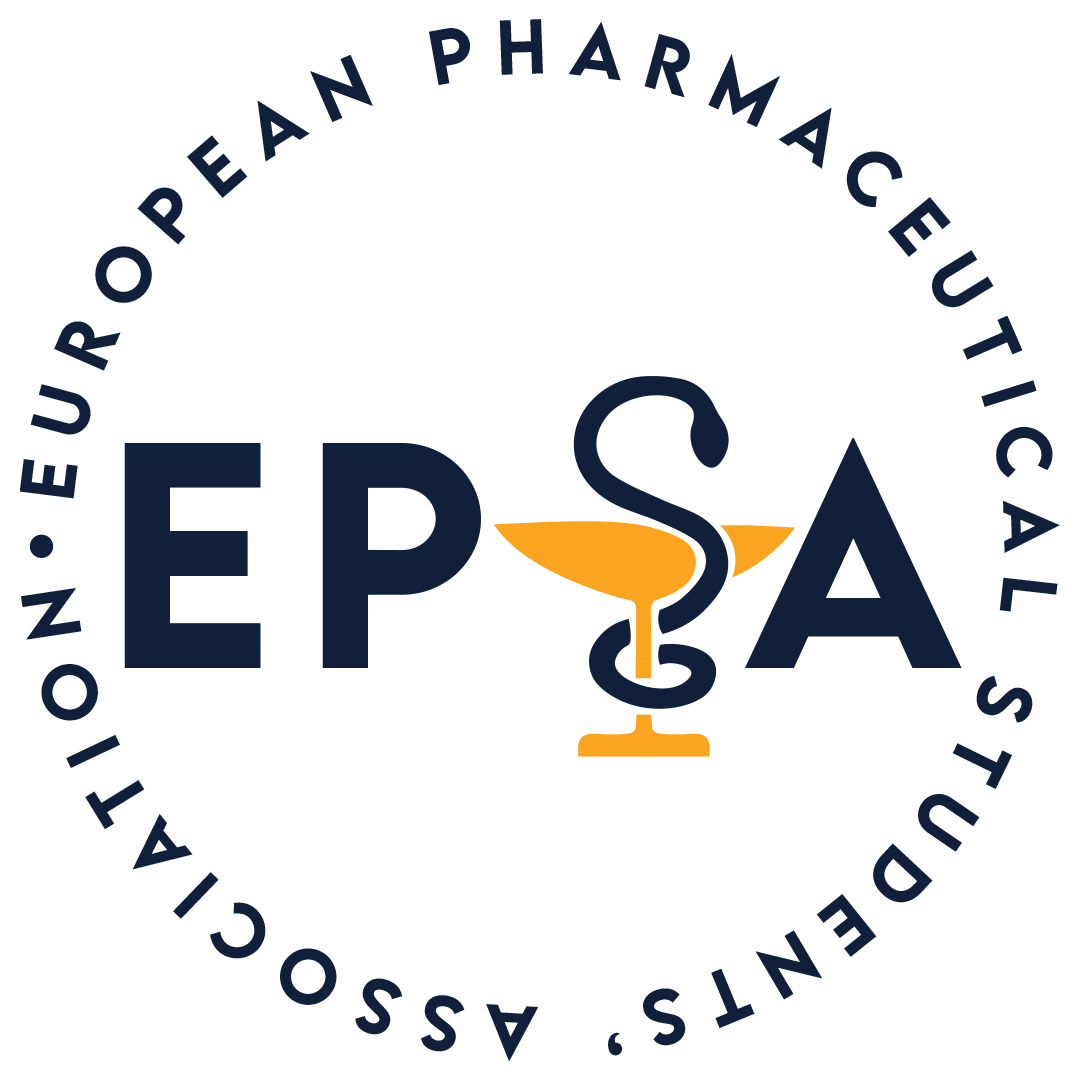
- Bringing Pharmacy, Knowledge and Students Together
- Formation: 1978
- Type: Student Association
- Headquarters: Brussels, Belgium
- Location: Rue du Luxembourg 19, 1000 Brussels, Belgium
- Official language: English
- President: Nina Wissing (Germany)
- Main organ: General Assembly
- Website: www.epsa-online.org

The European Pharmaceutical Students' Association (EPSA) is a non-profit, non-governmental, non-political and non-religious umbrella association of 44 Pharmaceutical Students' Associations.
