= National Union of Students in Denmark =

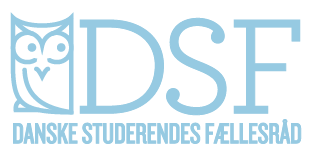
- Location: Jernbanegade 4, 2 tv, 1608 Copenhagen, Denmark
- Established: 1932
- President: Christoffer Rosenkvist
- Danish name: Danske Studerendes Fællesråd
- Website: dsfnet.dk

The National Union of Students in Denmark (Danish: Danske Studerendes Fællesråd, DSF), is an umbrella organisation of students' unions at higher education facilities in Denmark. Since 1932, DSF has represented the students of Denmark in matter of education policy.

The 17 membership organizations come from a range of different institutions; from universities to music academies each proportionally represented by mandate. DSF represents approximately 170.000 students, with the majority enrolled in universities.

== International work ==
DSF, as a member of the European Students' Union, contributes to the advancement of European higher education, often from the perspective of the Bologna Process.

DSF also collaborates with the nordics students’ unions. Similarly, in the Nordic Presidential Meeting (NOM), where also students from Greenland is represented, DSF takes part in the sharing of national experiences and discus larger trends in the international development of the sector.
