= CREUP =

Coordinator of Student Representatives of Public Universities
- Coordinadora de Representantes de Estudiantes de Universidades Públicas
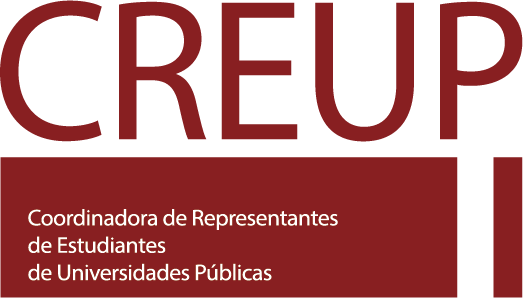
- logo
- Abbreviation: CREUP
- Type: Students Representation
- Official language: Spanish
- President: Alfonso Campuzano
- Website: www.creup.es

CREUP (La Coordinadora de Representantes de Estudiantes de Universidades Públicas or Coordinator of Student Representatives of Public Universities) is a Spanish association that represents more than 1,000,000 students. Nowadays it is formed by 31 public universities.
