= European United Left =

European United Left can refer to one of three political groups in the European Parliament:

- European United Left–Nordic Green Left
- European United Left (1989–93)
- European United Left (1994–95)

== See also ==
- Political groups of the European Parliament
