= National Union of Students (Papua New Guinea) =

National students' union in Papua New Guinea

The National Union of Students is the peak representative body for tertiary students in Papua New Guinea. It has involved representatives, among others, from the University of Papua New Guinea, the University of Goroka, the Papua New Guinea University of Technology (Lae, Bulolo and the Timber and Forestry Training College campuses), Divine Word University, the Papua New Guinea University of Natural Resources and Environment, Lae Technical College, Balob Teachers College and the Holy Trinity Teachers College (now part of Divine Word).

A number of NUS officebearers, such as former MP Ben Micah, have subsequently gone on to roles in national politics. It was also responsible for the PNG University Games, originally known as the National Union of Students Games.
