= Student Chamber of the Council of Higher Education Institutions =

In the education system of the Czech Republic, the Student Chamber of the Council of Higher Education Institutions (Czech: Studentská komora Rady vysokých škol; SK RVŠ), together with the Czech Rectors Conference (Czech: Česká konference rektorů; ČKR), forms the official representation of Czech Higher Education Institutes (HEIs), on the basis of the Higher Education Act of the Czech Republic, Article 92.

== Student representation in the Czech Republic ==
Students of universities and colleges in the Czech Republic are represented:

- at the faculty and university level by academic senates (this applies primarily to public HEIs),
- at the national and international level by the SK RVŠ (this also applies to private HEIs).

Every HEI can join the council after paying fees for its delegates. Each HEI may send one student delegate and substitute to the council. An HEI's delegates are elected for a three-year term by its governing body, called the Academic Senate (this applies mainly to public HEIs).

== Objective ==
The main purpose of the Chamber is to represent and defend the interests of students from all public, state, military, police, and private HEIs. The Chamber approves its own Programme Declaration for each three-year election term. During the 2006–2008 term, the Chamber lobbied for diversified, quality, open, and permeable higher education systems, and also to emphasize the social dimension of higher education. One of the Chamber's proposals is to prohibit age discrimination related to student status (i.e. various advantages linked to student status before reaching 26 years). Another key issue is the reform of tertiary education (tuition fees, management-line governance and expansion of study opportunities).

== History ==
The SK RVŠ was established via an amendment to the Statute of the council on 5 November 1992. At that point, every HEI could send a student delegate to the Chamber, but these were not considered members of the council. This changed in 1996 when the members of the Chamber became full members of the council. The most recent changes came into force on 1 January 2006, including an increase to five delegates to the Presidium of the council.

== Internal structures ==
The Council consists of the Assembly, Presidium and Closer Presidium and is headed by the Chair of the council. The Chamber's Chair, two Vice-chairs and two more delegates of the Chamber, who form the board of the SK RVŠ, are automatically members of the Presidium of the council. In the Closer Presidium, elected by the Assembly of the council, the Chamber is represented by its chair.
