= Dutch Student Union =

- Landelijke Studentenvakbond
- Abbreviation: LSVb
- Formation: 1983
- Affiliations: European Students' Union
- Website: lsvb.nl

The Dutch Student Union (Dutch: Landelijke Studentenvakbond, LSVb; lit. "National Student Union"), founded in 1983, is one of the two national students' unions of the Netherlands. LSVb represents the interests of university and hogeschool (vocational university) students in eight Dutch municipalities, often collaborating with the Dutch National Students Association (ISO).

LSVb is a full member of the European Students' Union.

== Member organisations ==
LSVb is a federation of nine constituent students' unions:

Municipality	Name	Abbreviation	Schools
Amsterdam	ASVA Student Union	ASVA	University of Amsterdam, Hogeschool van Amsterdam
Amsterdam	Student Union SRVU	SRVU	Vrije Universiteit Amsterdam
Delft	Association for Student Interests in Delft	VSSD	Delft University of Technology, Inholland University of Applied Sciences, The Hague University of Applied Sciences
Groningen	Student Federation of Groningen	GSb	University of Groningen, Hanze University of Applied Sciences
The Hague	Hague Student Union	HSVB	The Hague University of Applied Sciences
Leiden	LSbo	LSbo	Leiden University, University of Applied Sciences Leiden, Webster University Leiden
Nijmegen	Student Union AKKU	AKKU	Radboud University Nijmegen, HAN University of Applied Sciences
Utrecht	VIDIUS Student Union	VIDIUS	Utrecht University, HU University of Applied Sciences Utrecht
Zwolle	Student Consultation Body of Zwolle	SOOZ	Windesheim University of Applied Sciences, Pedagogische academie voor het basisonderwijs, Viaa, Artez
