= Swiss Student Union =

Swiss national students' union

The Swiss Student Union (VSS-UNES-USU, from German: Verband Schweizer Studierendenschaften, French: Union des Etudiant-e-s de Suisse, and Italian: Unione Svizzera degli Universitari) is the national students' union of Switzerland. Established in 1920, it is an umbrella organization of students' unions of most Swiss higher education institutions and represents the interests of students at the federal level. VSS-UNES-USU is a member of the European Students' Union.

In 2012, the VSS submitted the scholarship initiative (German: Stipendieninitiative), which proposed transferring responsibility for scholarships from the cantons to the federal administration. Though they expressed support for a reform to ensure equitable scholarship distribution, the initiative was opposed by both houses of the Federal Assembly and the Federal Council. All three instead supported an indirect counterproposal by the Federal Council that would only provide scholarships to cantons that met the requirements of the scholarship pact (German: Stipendienkonkordat); this counterproposal was also supported by the VSS. Voters ultimately overwhelmingly rejected the initiative in a referendum, with only 27.5% of votes and zero cantons voting in favor.

In November 2017, the student union of the University of Zurich (VSUZH) debated whether to leave the VSS. Ultimately its council voted in favor of remaining in the umbrella organization. At the end of 2024, the VSUZH temporarily left the VSS, with a potential return to be examined at the end of 2025. Several reasons were cited for the decision, with the primary cause being disagreements over the VSS response to pro-Palestinian protests and the Gaza war. As of 2026, the VSUZH appears to have rejoined the VSS.
