= Federation of Estonian Student Unions =

Organization based in Estonia

- Eesti Üliõpilaskondade Liit (EÜL)
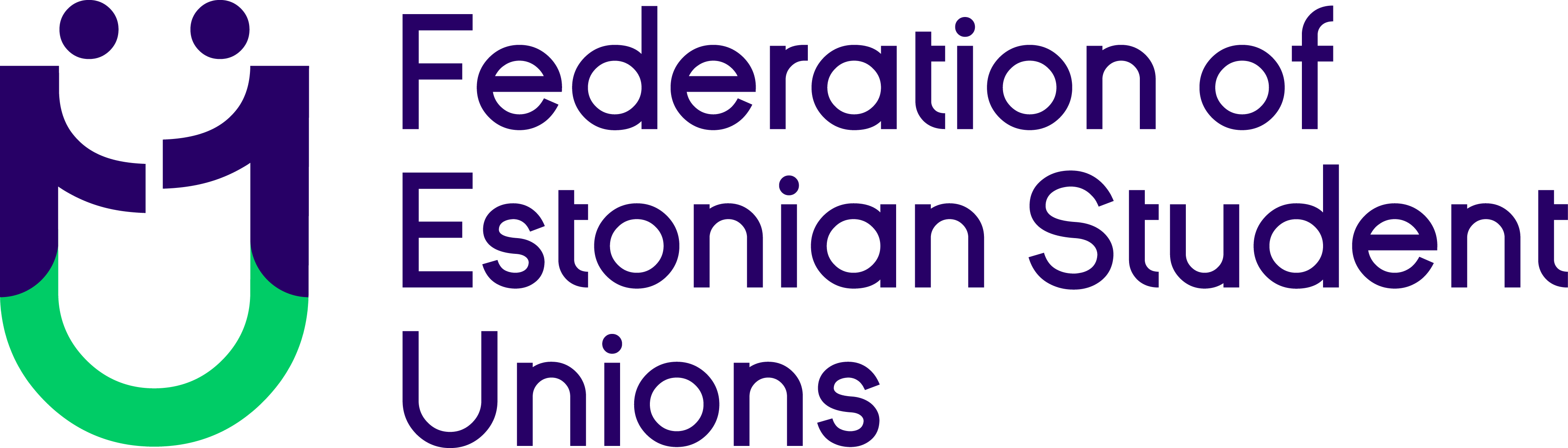
- Formation: 23 November 1991; 34 years ago
- Purpose: Students' union
- Headquarters: Pärnu mnt 102-21 (E), Tallinn, 11312
- Official language: Estonian
- Chairperson: Kärt Kaasik-Aaslav
- Vice-chairperson: Ronja Ansmann
- Website: www.eyl.ee

The Federation of Estonian Student Unions (Estonian: Eesti Üliõpilaskondade Liit, EÜL) is an umbrella organization that currently represents over 95% of Estonian students. It was founded on 23 November 1991, shortly after Estonia regained independence.

EÜL works closely together with Riigikogu (the parliament), the government, different ministries, higher education institutions and other partners. EÜL is also a leading NGO in Estonia and sometimes also represents students in schools, youth in general or just NGOs in different committees. EÜL is recognised as a partner by the Ministry of Education and Research. EÜL is a member of the European Students' Union.

== Structure ==
EÜL's main decision body is the EÜL General Meeting where all member student bodies are represented. Membership of EÜL is voluntary for a student body but all Estonian students are automatically members of their higher education institution (HEI) student body. There are no membership fees for the students for belonging to student unions or student bodies. EÜL also has a Council of 8 members, who are elected by the General Meeting every 2 years.

The General Meeting decides the main future plans and policies, adopts the plan of work, is in charge of the budget and elects the Board and other committees. The General Meeting members (25-30 total) are elected by the local unions, all students of all member unions are eligible to be elected as member of the council or the General Meeting. Each member union of EÜL shall have 1 member and an additional member on EÜL General Meeting for every 2000 students (e.g., a HEI with 6200 students has 4 members on EÜL General Meeting). The General Meeting assembles regularly at least twice per year.

The board currently consists of two people with a two-year mandate – the chairperson and the vice-chairperson.

Since 2000 EÜL Board members usually had a mandate of one year. From 2006 to 2007 there was a transition period in which the start of the mandate was pushed from January to July to be more compatible with local unions democratic cycle. Thus the mandate for board members was longer than 12 months.

In February 2009 the General Meeting decided to change the mandate of the Board to two full years beginning from 1 July 2009. Concurrently with that, the Board has since consisted of only the chairperson and vice-chairperson. This aimed to create a more professional leadership in EÜL. The Board is in charge of EÜL office which consists of 5 to 7 employees and project managers.

Other structures in EÜL are the Advisory Council which advises the Board on strategical decisions and on extraordinary financial issues, and the Supervisory Committee which supervises the Board and makes sure that EÜL governance is complying with the law and the decisions of the General Meeting.

Previous Board members
1991–1992	Sulev Alajõe, Agu Vahur, Kaarel Tarand
1992–1994	Katrin Unt, Indrek Ild, Imre Sams, Indrek Ostrat
1995–1996	Meelis Kitsing, Arne Otter, Martti Kalda
1996–1997	Lauri Kööp, Lembit Uibo, Peeter Suislepp, Mare Tralla, Mart Rekkaro
1997–1998	Peeter Suislepp, Lauri Kööp, Raul Järg, Leif Kalev
1998–1999	Riina Tamm, Leif Kalev, Raul Järg, Ivar Liivamägi, Riho Unt, Illimar Mattus
2000	Leif Kalev, Riho Unt, Rain Veetõusme, Tarvo Sarmet, Herman Kalmus
2001	Birgit Lao, Herman Kalmus, Leif Kalev, Arne Otter, Alari Vainomees, Ardi Ravalepik
2002	Ando Heilmann, Piret Hartman, Antti Andreimann
2003	Piret Hartman, Madis Masing, Reigo Kimmel, Kerli Albin, Kairi Saar
2004	Madis Masing, Allan Selirand, Lauri Paeveer
2005	Allan Selirand, Eveli Soode, Lauri Paeveer
2006–2007	Heiki Lemba, Ivar Veskioja, Marja-Liisa Alop
2007–2008	Eimar Veldre, Annika Kruuse, Catlyn Kirna, Maris Mälzer
2008–2009	Joonas Pärenson, Allan Päll, Grete Mägi, Olga Tšerjomuškina
2009–2011	Maris Mälzer, Eimar Veldre
2011–2013	Eimar Veldre, Monika Maljukov, Jonne Viinamägi
2013–2015	Sigrid Västra, Johann Peetre, Silver Ool
2015–2017	Jaanus Müür, Katrina Koppel
2017–2019	Britt Järvet, Tambet Anja/ Joonatan Nõgisto
2019–2021	Eleri Pilliroog, Kristel Jakobson/ Joonatan Nõgisto
2021-2023	Marcus Ehasoo, Kristin Pintson
2023-2025	Katariina Järve, Lennart Mathias Männik
2025-2026	Kärt Kaasik-Aaslav, Ronja Ansmann
2026-2027	Robin Liiber, Ronja Ansmann

== Other activities ==
EÜL also distributes the International Student Identity Card which is an identity card for students, teachers and youth in general. The ISIC card is the main source of revenue for EÜL.

== Memberships ==
EÜL is a member of Nordiskt Ordförande Möte (NOM), European Students' Union (ESU) and Network of Estonian Non-profit Organisations (EMSL).
