= Eurodoc =

Eurodoc, the European Council of Doctoral Candidates and Junior Researchers
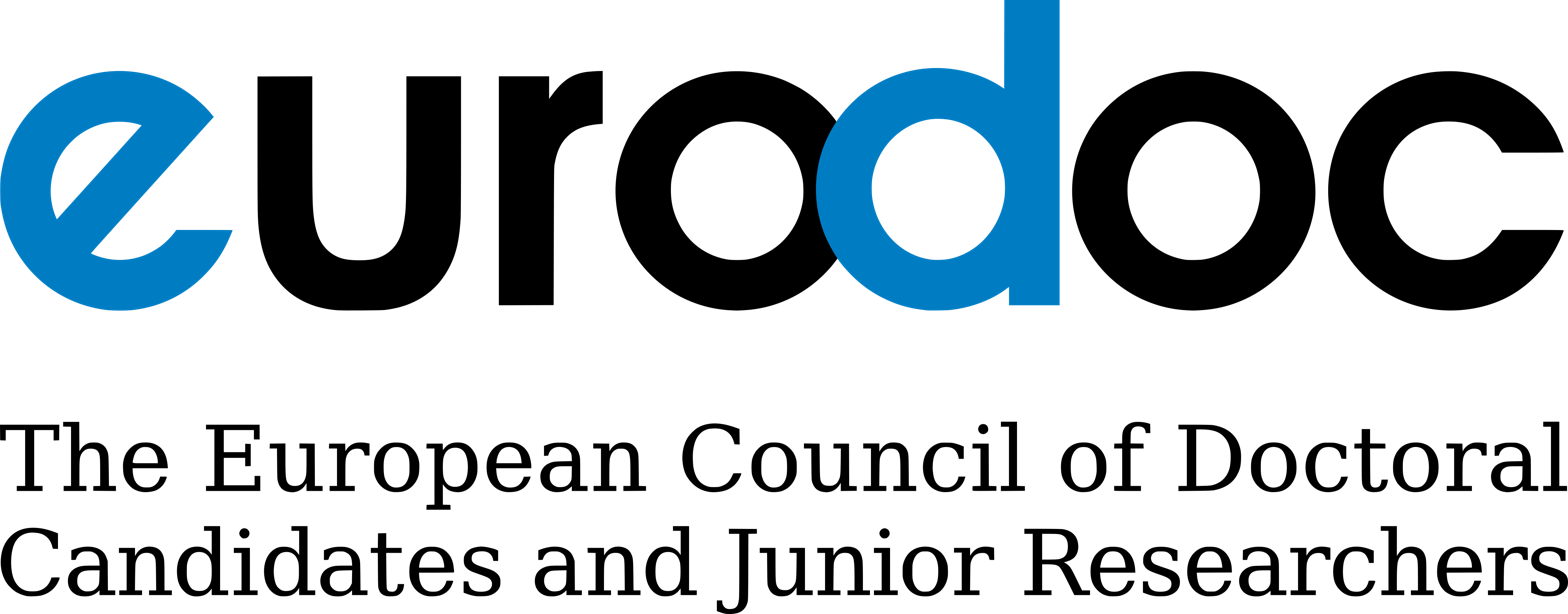

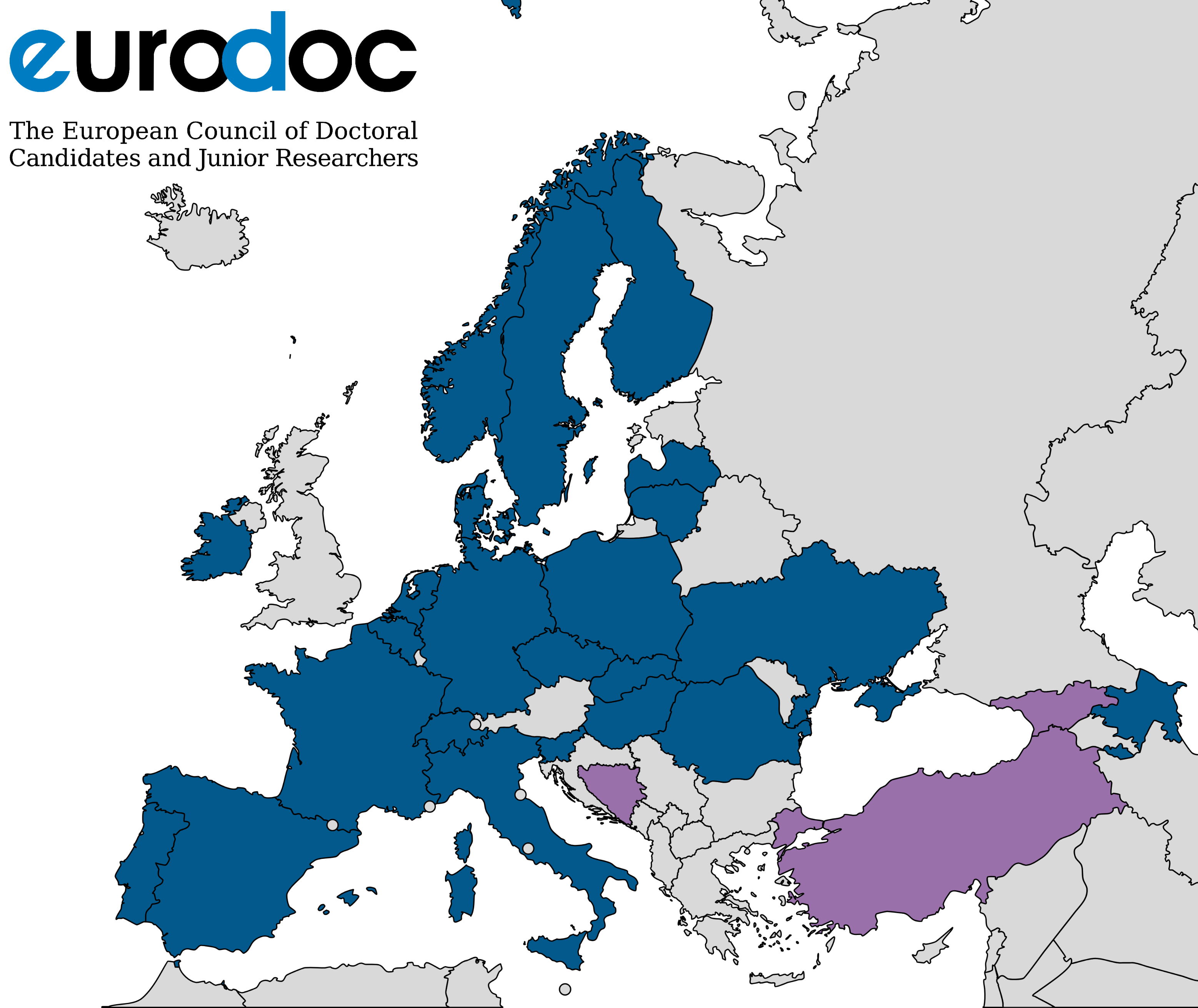
- Established: 2 February 2002; 24 years ago
- Founded at: Girona, Spain
- Legal status: non-profit international association
- Purpose: advocating for early career researchers
- Location: Brussels, Belgium
- Region served: member countries of European Union and Council of Europe
- Field: research, innovation, doctoral training
- Members: 29 national associations of doctoral candidates and junior researchers from 26 countries (2022)
- Official language: English
- President: Norbert Bencze (Hungary)
- Main organ: Annual General Meeting
- Website: eurodoc.net

Eurodoc, the European Council of Doctoral Candidates and Junior Researchers, is an international federation of national associations of doctoral candidates and early career researchers (pre-doctoral or post-doctoral researchers employed on a temporary basis) of the European Union and the Council of Europe.

== History ==
The initiative for the first conference, held in 2001, was taken by the Doktorandnämnden of Uppsala Student Union, who organized the conference together with SweDoc, i.e. the Swedish association of doctoral candidates. Eurodoc was subsequently founded in Girona, Spain on 2 February 2002. Eurodoc was legally established in 2005 in Brussels as an international non-profit organisation.

In a meeting of ministers responsible for higher education in Berlin in 2003, doctoral programmes were first mentioned in the Bologna Process setting. Since then, Eurodoc has been playing an active role in pertinent Bologna seminars and projects. Its involvement in the Bologna Process has been formally acknowledged in 2007 by the formal status of "partner" to the Bologna Process follow-up group. In addition, Eurodoc has been involved and provided input for the European Higher Education Area and the European Research Area.

=== Eurodoc Conferences and Annual General Meetings ===
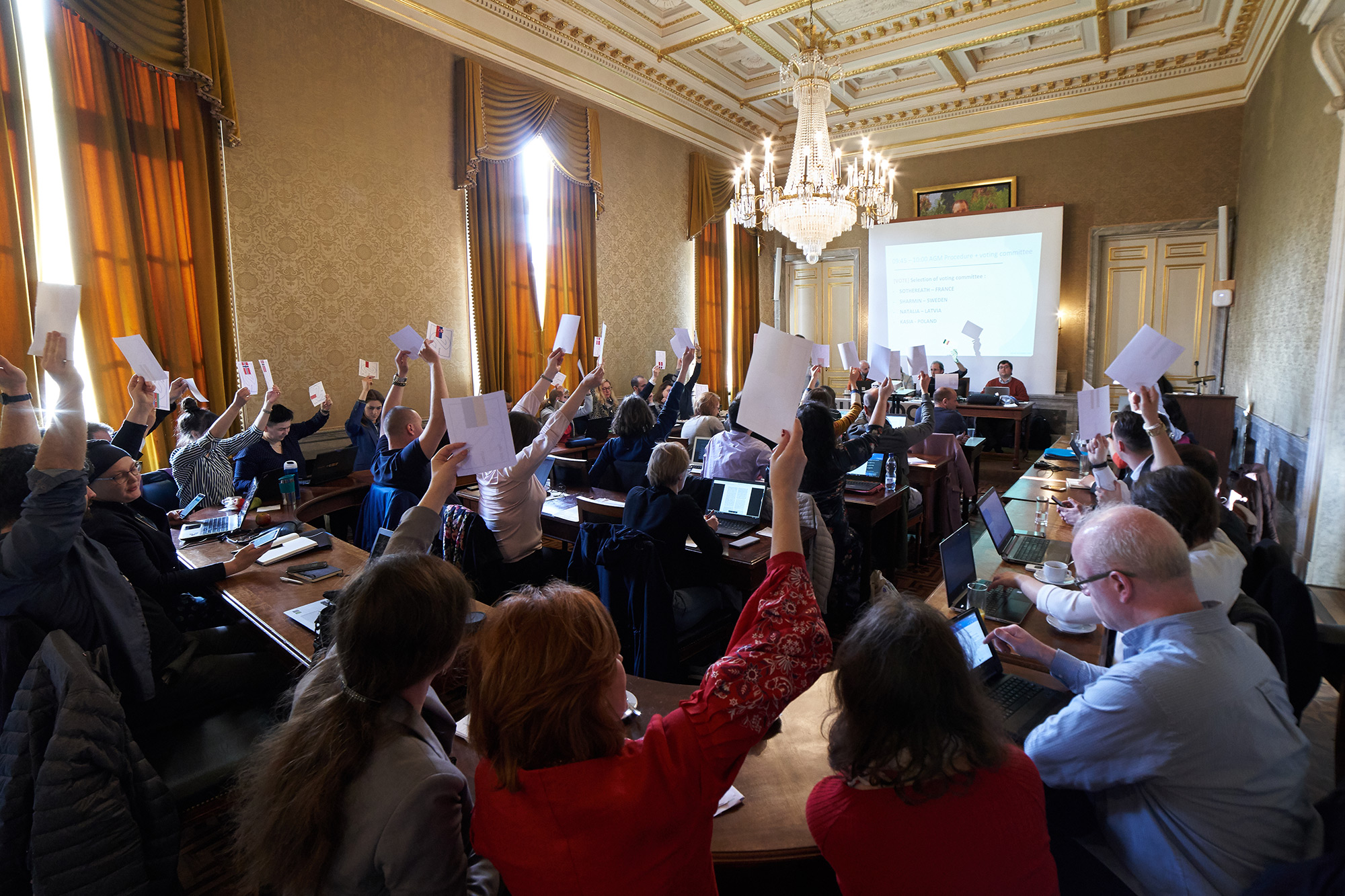
Delegates vote during the Eurodoc General Meeting in Brussels, Belgium, on 3 April 2019.

Each year, Eurodoc convenes an international conference. This conference aims to provide a framework for doctoral candidates and junior researchers to meet with European political and economic leaders and to engage in a fruitful discussion on the construction of the European Research and Higher Education Area. Conferences are usually followed by an Annual General Meeting (AGM), Eurodoc's highest decision-making body.

==== Conference & AGM 2021 in Prague, Czech Republic ====
The Eurodoc Conference 2021 was held in Prague on 14–15 July 2021 in a hybrid form to bring together as many people as the pandemic situation allowed while streaming it online. The event was organised by the Committee for Doctoral Education under the Student Chamber of the Council of Higher Education Institutions (SK RVŠ) from the Czech Republic and Eurodoc. The conference placed focus on the quality and appropriate conditions of doctoral training and career development with the title: "Improving Doctoral Training in Europe."

==== Conference & AGM 2020 in Warsaw, Poland (Online) ====
The Eurodoc 2020 conference took place on 22–23 July 2020. It was the first online Eurodoc Conference in history. Due to the epidemic, organisers were obliged to change the date and form of the conference. The event was organised by Krajowa Reprezentacja Doktorantów (KRD) and Eurodoc with the financial support of the Ministry of Science and Higher Education Republic of Poland. The topic of the conference was "Open Up Your Science!"

== Member organisations ==
Eurodocs member organisations comprise of 27 national associations of doctoral candidates and early-career researchers representing young researchers from 25 countries of the European Union and the Council of Europe. Each country can have up to two national associations represented, to reflect the different career stages of researchers represented by Eurodoc. Some members, notably AMLÉ, SFS and ANOSR are also member organisations of the European Students' Union, due to doctoral candidates being considered students in these countries.

Country	English name	Local name	Abbreviation
Austria	N/A	Netzwerk Unterbau Wissenschaft	NuWiss
Azerbaijan	Azerbaijan Young Scientists, Postgraduates and Masters Union	N/A	AYSPMU
Belgium	PhD Society Leuven	N/A	N/A
Croatia	Association Penkala	Udruga Penkala	Penkala
Czech Republic	Student Chamber of the Council of Higher Education Institutions	Studentská komora Rady vysokých škol	SKRVS
Denmark	PhD Association Network of Denmark	N/A	PAND
Estonia	Estonian Doctoral Society	Doktorantide Selts	DOCSOC/DOK
Finland	Union of Research Professionals	Tieteentekijät	RP
France	National Association of Doctors	Association Nationale des Docteurs	ANDès
Germany	The interdisciplinary network for PhD candidates and doctorate holders in Germany	N/A	THESIS
Hungary	Association of Hungarian PhD and DLA Candidates	Doktoranduszok Országos Szövetsége	DOSZ
Ireland	N/A	Aontas na Mac Léinn in Éirinn	AMLÉ
Ireland	Irish Federation of University Teachers	Cónaidhm Éireannach na Múinteoirí Ollscoile	IFUT
Italy	Association of PhD candidates and PhDs in Italy	Associazione Dottorandi e Dottori di Ricerca in Italia	ADI
Latvia	Latvian Association of Young Researchers	Latvijas Jauno zinātnieku apvienība	LJZA
Lithuania	N/A	Lithuanian Society of Young Researchers	LSYR
Netherlands	N/A	PhD Network Netherlands	PNN
Norway	N/A	Stipendiatorganisasjonene i Norge	SiN
Poland	Polish National Association of Doctoral Candidates	Krajowa Reprezentacja Doktorantów	KRD
Portugal	Portuguese Association of the grant-holding researchers	Associação dos Bolseiros de Investigação Científica	ABIC
Romania	National Alliance of Student Organizations in Romania	Alianta Nationala a Organizatiilor Studentesti din Romania	ANOSR
Slovenia	The Young Academy of Slovenia	Mlada akademija	MA
Spain	Spanish Federation of Early-career Researchers’ Associations	La Federación de Jóvenes Investigadores/Precarios	FJI-Precarios
Sweden	Swedish National Union of Students Doctoral Committee	Sveriges Förenade Studentkårer Doktorandkommittén	SFS-DK
Sweden	Swedish Network of Postdoc Associations (SNPA)	N/A	SNPA
Switzerland	Umbrella organisation of academic mid-level staff in Switzerland	Actionuni der Schweizer Mittelbau	ActionUni
Ukraine	Young Scientists Council at the Ministry of Education and Science of Ukraine	Рада молодих вчених при Міністерстві освіти і науки Україн	YSC/RMU

== Objectives ==
Eurodoc envisions a European Research Area and European Higher Education Area in which doctoral candidates and junior researchers are duly recognised and respected for the essential roles they play in the research community. Eurodoc seeks to represent and consolidate the community of doctoral candidates and junior researchers in Europe in their pursuit of a dignified career and professional life.

As a volunteer-led, non-profit organisation, Eurodoc monitors the situation of early career researchers in Europe with respect to different parameters (e.g. mobility, working conditions, employment opportunities, career paths, doctoral supervision and training). An example of this is a report published in 2026 on the remuneration of doctoral candidates across Europe.

Eurodoc issues policy statements and provides recommendations to academic, corporate and governing institutions on subjects of special relevance to European doctoral candidates and junior researchers (e.g., the Bologna Process or the Lisbon Strategy). In this activity, Eurodoc is in regular contact with major stakeholders in European research and higher education policy, most notably with the Directorate-General for Research (European Commission), and the European University Association.

The first Eurodoc Survey was conducted from December 2008 until May 2011. It analysed the current situation of 7561 doctoral candidates in twelve countries (Austria, Belgium, Hungary, Finland, France, Germany, the Netherlands, Norway, Portugal, Slovenia, Spain and Sweden), and provided input for policy recommendations at the European level.

Eurodoc has also made political statements when an issue affects the safety and wellbeing of early-career researchers. Notably, Eurodoc called for delivering greater financial aid to Ukraine during the Russo-Ukrainian war to protect Ukrainian researchers and academia. Eurodoc has also called for the suspension of the state of Israel from the Horizon Europe funding framework, in light of the destruction of Palestinian academia during the Gaza war.

== See also ==
- European Higher Education Area
- European Research Area
- European Charter for Researchers
- World Association of Young Scientists
