= Student bill of rights =

Document outlining student rights

A student bill of rights is a document that outlines beliefs or regulations regarding student rights, typically adopted by a student group, school, or government. These documents can be policies, laws, or statements of belief.

When put forth by a student organization or third party organization, groups that usually do not have the power of enforcement, student bills of rights are usually statements of belief. Even though they are not legally binding, these student bills of rights can act as foundations for future agreements or legislative efforts, helping others understand what students believe to be ethical treatment. The European Students' Union, for example, uses their Student Rights Charter when lobbying for student rights in the European Union Higher Education Area as a document representing the student will. The historic National Student Association in the United States used their Student Bill of Rights to help create a dialogue with the American Association of University Professors, which initiated the creation of a joint statement on student rights.

At the institutional level, student bills of rights tend to be policy statements. On rare occasions, they can also be legally binding, as promises from the school or university to the students who abide by the educational contract. At any level, student bills of rights can provide students with an understanding of their legal rights: rights pertinent to all citizens and rights specifically pertinent to students in the educational setting. When used as a statement of belief, however, a student bill of rights often includes the natural rights that an organization feels students have, as well as the procedural rights institutions must follow to ensure these rights are fulfilled.

While there have been some attempts to create student rights bills in the United States, these have not been successful. Some other countries, like Romania, have more robust systems to protect student rights, which can include student bills of rights.

== North America ==
No country in North America has yet adopted a national student bill of rights.

=== United States ===
In the United States, there have been several student bills of rights drafted by student organizations including the historic National Student Association, the American Association of University Professors, and other non-governmental organizations. As of March 2022, none have been legally institutionalized.

==== National Student Association ====
In 1947, the National Student Association (NSA) in the United States adopted a student bill of rights. The United States Student Association similarly upholds the 1947 student bill of rights put forth by the National Student Association. In 1967, the NSA put forth a joint statement on the rights and freedoms of students with the American Association of University Professors. This statement was endorsed by a number of professional organizations. This document included the following rights:

Constitutional Rights

1. Exercise of rights of citizenship
2. Freedom of association
3. Right to due process

Speech and Association Rights

1. Student participation in institutional government
2. Student publications

Due Process Rights

1. Standards for investigation of student conduct
  1. Investigation of student conduct
  2. Hearings for student conduct

Classroom Rights

1. Protection of freedom of inquiry and expression
2. Protection from improper academic evaluation
3. Protection from improper student information disclosure

==== 2002 Student Bill of Rights ====
In 2002, Pennsylvania Congressman Chaka Fattah introduced H.R.5346, titled the "Student Bill of Rights". The bill outlined a long history of academic inadequacy in the United States and characterized the gap in educational opportunities for low-income, urban, rural, and minority students. It established provisions aimed towards increasing access to educational opportunity, redefining the standards for educational adequacy and equity, and gave the States the power to decide how best to alter local school policies and procedures in order to meet those standards. The Bill was sponsored by 125 members of Congress, including Nancy Pelosi, Bernie Sanders, and John Lewis. After being introduced, it was transferred to the House Subcommittee on Education Reform, where it was ultimately rejected.

==== 2003 Academic Bill of Rights ====
In 2003, Georgia congressman Jack Kingston proposed another national student bill of rights, House Bill 318. This bill, also rejected in Congress, was not an all-encompassing student bill of rights but was narrowly defined to address academic freedom. The congressman found that "at almost every American university, conservative professors are drastically outnumbered." This bill was intended to secure the intellectual freedom of students and faculty. It did not address whether teachers would have the freedom to determine all course goals, curriculum, assignments, grading schemes and course timeline.

=== Canada ===
The Canadian Encyclopedia, which details issues of Canadian life and governance, states that "2 sorts of rights apply to students: substantive rights - the actual rights that students should enjoy - and procedural rights - methods by which students claim their rights. This article is concerned with students in public institutions, although those in private schools can claim rights under the common law and provincial education Acts."

The Canadian Federation of Students has yet to accept a student bill of rights.

In the 1960s, the Canadian Union of Students had adopted the Declaration on the Canadian Student, a declaration aimed defining the rights and role of a student. The Declaration was adopted at the September 1965 annual meeting of the CUS, and was initiated mainly by the Students' Union of the University of Ottawa President Jock Turcot. A year later, the CUS re-affirmed the "fundamental philosophy" behind the Declaration.

== Europe ==
=== European Students' Union ===
In 2008, the European Students' Union adopted a Student Rights Charter, which is in essence their platform. Romania currently has the strongest student rights legislation in the European Union, in part to do with the efforts of the European Student Union to press for legislation. The 2008 ESU Student Rights Charter includes the following rights:

Access to Higher Education

1. Everyone has the right to an inclusive, high quality education free of charge.
2. Everyone has the right to access correct information, in a transparent manner, on the content, outcome and requirements of an educational programme.
3. Everyone has the right to free access to adequate means of support in order to take up, progress through and complete their educational programme.
4. All students have the right to an education that is inclusive.
5. All students have the right to have their backgrounds and experiences recognized as an important part of educational quality and to be able to make use of them.
6. All students have the right to an education imbued with different equality perspectives that improve the quality of education.
7. All students have the right to progress between cycles.
8. Everyone has the right to adequate counselling about their options before they choose a study programme.
9. All students have the right to apply to any institution without administrative, financial or physical restrictions.

Student Involvement

1. All students have the right to organize themselves freely in legally recognized entities. Students must not suffer academic, financial or legal consequences stemming from such involvement.
2. All students have the right to co-governance in all decision making bodies and fora relevant to their education directly or through democratic representation.
3. Students have the right to be informed about all higher education affairs in a transparent manner.
4. All students have the right to have their opinion considered as that of a stakeholder on equal footing in higher education.
5. All students have the right to freely express themselves and this should not be limited to academic matters.

Extracurricular Aspect of Study

1. All students have the right to adequate counselling and support on their wellbeing; on how to successfully complete their education; and on how to prepare themselves for integration into the labour market.
2. All students have the right to adequate social support that meets their needs on an individual basis.
3. All students have the right to financial independence.
4. All students have the right to a free and fair appeal against any act which they feel to be discriminatory.
5. All students have the right to a space for social interaction.
6. All students have the right to specific social support related to their educational mobility.

Curricular Aspect of Study

1. All students have the right to be evaluated or graded solely on academic performance including extra-curricular activities which are specifically counted as part of their academic programme.
2. All students have the right to a free and fair appeal against any decision related to their studies.
3. All students have the right to a flexible study program.
4. All students have the right to teaching and learning environments that support and encourage the development of autonomous learning, critical thinking and personal growth.
5. All students have the right to teaching and evaluation methods suitable to their mode of education.
6. All students have the right to academic freedom of thought; and the freedom to challenge the knowledge that exists today.
7. All students have the right to fair recognition of comparable qualifications.
8. All students have the right to a continuously reviewed and up-to-date programme.
9. All students have the right to participate as equal partners in the continuous assessment and improvement of their educational programmes.
10. All students have the right to free access to comprehensive and objective information on the quality of the programme and institution in which they wish to study or are already studying.
11. All students have the right to have the grading of their academic work challenged by an external examiner

=== Romania ===
Romania is the country which has the greatest student rights legislation currently in place. In 2010, the National Alliance of Student Organizations in Romania, which is also part of the European Student Union, and the Romanian Students' Union (USR) worked with the Romanian national government to bring into law the Romanian National Student Code of Rights and Responsibilities. This document provides Romanian students with roughly a hundred which theoretical rights and procedural rights necessary to ensure theoretical rights are fulfilled. This document includes the following rights:

Educational Package Rights

1. Right to a quality education
2. Right to a student centered educational environment
3. Right to opportunities to develop personally
4. Right to opportunities to develop socially
5. Right to opportunities to acquire skills required to find and retain employment
6. Right to an educational contract
7. Right to equal treatment among equal students
8. Right to equity where some students are at an educational disadvantage
9. Right to information, information transparency and accessibility
10. Right to educational quality standards which are assessed and accountable
11. Right to student involvement in institutional decision-making
12. Right to at least one free copy of the student record including diplomas, certificates and transcripts
13. Right to information on all student rights and responsibilities
14. Right to grievance reporting, hearing and appeals processes
15. Right to be provided educational materials while attending institutions of higher education
16. Right to housing accommodations, unless a student studies in their place of residence
17. Right to transportation while attending institutions of higher education
18. Right to meals while attending institutions of higher education
19. Right to medical coverage while attending institutions of higher education
20. Right to postpone and resume studies
21. Right to transfer from one university to another
22. Right to the protection of student information
23. Right to an eight-hour school day

Contract Rights

1. Right to a continuous contract during a period of enrollment, without a change in degree requirements
2. Right to retain property and copyright for results of research, artistic creation and innovation unless contracts exist
3. Right to participate in programs and services in accordance with advertised program objectives
4. Right to be evaluated in accordance with advertised curriculum evaluation criteria
5. Right to be evaluated with criteria in line with advertised course objectives

Equitability Rights

1. Right to equitable recruitment, admissions, readmissions, testing, education, instruction and assessment
2. Right to access social mobility programs and resources
3. Right to subsidized tuition for students from historically marginalized and low socio-economic backgrounds
4. Right to free educational and professional guidance, counseling, tutoring and monitoring for subsidized students
5. Right to the availability of academic, professional psychological and social counseling with educational objectives
6. Right to study in one's native language or a language of international communication if offered
7. Right to exam accommodations for certified temporary and permanent medical conditions
8. Right to have registration periods of at least on working week after the posting of scholarships or programs
9. Right to flexible learning paths and a minimum number of optional courses
10. Right to be provided free medical assistance
11. Right to a 50% + discount on public transportation
12. Right to a 75% discount for access to events organized by public institutions
13. Right to subsidies for housing accommodations for low income or historically marginalized backgrounds

Accountability & Quality Assurance Rights

1. Right to a quality education (with quality standards in place)
2. Right to quality standards for teachers and course resources for use in quality assurance and evaluation
3. Right to quality standards for support resources for use in quality assurance and evaluation
4. Right to the availability of information related to stated educational objectives
5. Right to participate in evaluation of teachers, courses, seminars, programs, practicums, internships, residencies
6. Right to access teacher, course, seminar, program, practicum, internship, residency evaluations as public info
7. Right to have evaluations used for assessment of quality and objective achievement
8. Right to know how tuition, fees and other charges are determined or justified
9. Right to be informed about the number, type and amount of each fee charged
10. Right to institutional consultation with student organizations on issues in higher education
11. Right to representative participation in university executive and deliberative bodies
12. Right to 25%+ representative participation in the university senate and faculty council
13. Right to representative participation in faculty counsels and university senates or governance structures
14. Right to representative participation in management of social services, accommodations and scholarships
15. Right to representatives participation in government departments involving students
16. Right to representative participation in choosing and appointing an institutional president or head
17. Right to student representative elections free of interference from instructors and administrators
18. Right to serve as a student representative for up to four years regardless of academic performance or attendance
19. Right to be informed and consulted by student representatives on matters in institutional governance
20. Right for student organizations to develop an annual report on institutional compliance with this code
21. Right to an annual response to the compliance report including proposed improvements and a timeline

Due Process Rights

1. Right to submit grievances and expect recourse for identity theft
2. Right to submit grievances and expect recourse for abuse of power
3. Right to submit grievances and expect recourse for arbitrary and capricious decision making
4. Right to appeal grades before a committee. The instructor who issued the grade may not sit on this committee.
5. Right to request a review of complaints by specialized bodies
6. Right to be present during appeal hearings
7. Right to protection from retribution when making a complaint (whistle blower protections)
8. Right to have all written or online requests registered
9. Right to have all written and online requests answered

Information Accessibility Rights

1. Right to freely access all educational materials available in university libraries or institutional websites
2. Right to receive, upon admissions, a Student Guide containing information on:
  1. student rights and responsibilities
  2. materials and services provided by the university
  3. evaluation methods
  4. justification and methods used to establish fees
  5. university and faculty facilities
  6. details about student organizations
  7. ways of accessing scholarships and other financial facilities
3. Right to receive a five-page syllabus within the first two weeks of the semester containing:
  1. course objectives
  2. general competences or outcomes students will achieve
  3. curriculum
  4. course timeline of readings and assignments
  5. evaluation and examination methods
4. Right to adherence to the syllabus unless the teacher has the students agreement
5. Right to receive the syllabus in either an electronic format or a physical copy
6. Right to information on the scale used for evaluation of skills
7. Right to institutional policies which inform students of their rights
8. Right to access regulations, decisions, meeting minutes and any other legal documents at the institution
9. Right to receive a copy of their diploma, thesis, score and details about the score??
10. Right to information on criteria and methods used to identify and evaluate processional practice
11. Right to information on criteria used to evaluate the quality of academic classes and programs

== Africa ==
In December 2020, the Nigeria's version of the Student Bill of Rights (SBOR) was launched by HELP foundation, a youth-led advocacy group for education rights in Nigeria.

The document that was proposed as "A BILL FOR AN ACT TO DECLARE AND PROTECT THE RIGHTS AND SAFETY OF STUDENTS IN HIGHER INSTITUTIONS OF LEARNING, PROMOTE CAMPUS ETHICS, AND OTHER MATTERS INCIDENTAL THERETO, 2020,” is poised to address cultural magnitude of abuse such as sexual harassment, extortion, police brutality and repression of democratic freedoms on Nigeria's campuses.

This will be the second Student Bill of Rights advocacy in Africa after Afriforum Youth's proposal in the University of Pretoria, South Africa, in 2012.

== See also ==
- Academic Bill of Rights
- European Students' Union
- Leonard Law
- National Youth Rights Association
- Student rights
- Student activism
- Students' union
- Student voice
- The Freechild Project
- Youth rights
