= Oregon Student Association =

Advocacy group for college students in Oregon, United States

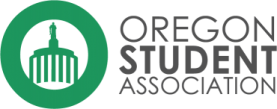
- Founded: 1975
- Dissolved: 2024
- Type: Student organization
- Purpose: Making Oregon higher education more affordable and accessible.
- Headquarters: Portland, Oregon
- Members: 88,000
- Employees: 3
- Website: www.orstudents.org

The Oregon Student Association (OSA) was a non-profit organization established in 1975 to represent, serve and protect the collective interests of students in post-secondary education in the U.S. state of Oregon.

OSA focuses on issues such as tuition, financial aid, and student rights. OSA also provided a collective voice for students in state government, public universities overseen by the Higher Education Coordinating Commission and other state boards and commissions.

The organization ceased operations in October of 2024 due to a challenging financial landscape, with the majority of its income coming from student incidental fees, declining membership, and the death of one of its 5 staff members in a car crash, with another staff member being seriously injured.

== See also ==
- United States Student Association
