= Hendricks v. Clemson University =

U.S. legal case

Hendricks v. Clemson University, 4. S.C. Code Ann. 15-78-60(25) (Supp. 2002), was a negligence case against Clemson University that was appealed to the South Carolina Supreme Court. The plaintiff, a student-athlete named R.J. Hendricks, was ruled ineligible to play baseball within the National Collegiate Athletic Association (NCAA) at the NCAA Division I level based on erroneous athletic academic advising.

The case considered whether advising mistakes made by a student-athlete's academic advisor, resulting in the student-athlete's loss of eligibility, amounted to negligence. The trial court offered the defendant ("Clemson") summary judgment, which the plaintiff ("Hendricks") appealed to the Thirteenth Judicial Circuit. The Supreme Court of South Carolina reversed the Court of Appeals' decision back to the trial court's original summary judgment.

== Parties ==
The plaintiff in this case was R.J. Hendricks II, an NCAA Division II student-athlete who played baseball for St. Leo College in Florida while pursuing a major in business administration. During Hendricks' junior year, he decided to transfer to Clemson, where he attempted to use his final year of eligibility at the Division I level after being granted a transfer exception by the NCAA. While attending Clemson, Hendricks received academic advising from Barbara Kennedy-Dixon.

Kennedy-Dixon served as an athletics administrator for over 31 years at Clemson. She assisted in coaching, compliance, and academic services. Over time, she served as an athletic-academic advisor, Clemson's Senior Women's Administrator, and ultimately as the institution's Assistant Athletic Director for Academic Services. Prior to serving as an athletics administrator, she was a stand-out basketball player at Clemson as a student-athlete. She died at the age of 58 in 2018 from cancer.

The case named Clemson University as the plaintiff rather than Kennedy-Dixon. Clemson is a university of 28,466 total students in Clemson, South Carolina. The Clemson Tigers compete in NCAA Division I competition in men's and women's varsity sports.

== Background ==
Hendricks transferred to Clemson to play Division I baseball with a scholarship for books (only) after competing for St. Leo as a scholarship athlete through his junior year, with the intention of returning to St. Leo to finish his degree in business administration. After transferring and being advised to switch his major to speech and communications during his time at Clemson, he was advised by Kennedy-Dixon to take fall semester classes that would keep him eligible to play in the following spring semester.

Due to an advising error, Hendricks was ruled ineligible to play during that spring semester because he did not satisfy the NCAA's fifty-percent rule, which says that student-athletes must complete "at least fifty percent of the course requirements toward [their] major to be eligible to compete during [their] fourth year of college enrollment." For a student-athlete to be able to compete in NCAA competition, they must become and remain eligible according to NCAA guidelines. Although Hendricks became ineligible to play at Clemson, he continued through the end of the spring semester and transferred back to St. Leo to finish out his degree and eligibility.

Hendricks sued based on "negligence, breach of fiduciary duty and breach of contract." The suit detailed that "improper academic advisement," which included "excess electives," ultimately "rendered him ineligible" to compete at Clemson. This happened after losing his scholarship upon his return to St. Leo after transferring to Clemson.

Four elements of negligence need to be proven to launch a claim: duty of care, breach of duty, causation, and damages. The damages Hendricks alleged in the suit included tuition and other expenses at Clemson and St. Leo, lost wages, emotional suffering, 1996 College World Series experience, Division I baseball experience, and professional opportunities. Other questions in this case included whether Clemson had a duty of care to their student-athletes. If so, the question became whether or not Clemson breached that duty and whether that brought both harm and damages.

== Lower courts ==
During trial court, Clemson was awarded summary judgment. This surmised that Clemson did not breach contract and Hendricks did not suffer damages. In Kennedy-Dixon's case, she did not commit gross negligence. In an appeal to the Thirteenth Judicial Circuit in Pickens County, South Carolina, parts of the outcome were affirmed in part, reversed in part, and remanded. The case was appealed to the Supreme Court of South Carolina.

== Supreme Court of South Carolina ==
Concerning the suit, the court found that Clemson "did not owe a duty to Hendricks" based on "significant policy concerns." Additionally, the court ruled that there is no fiduciary duty present between college advisors and students. While parts of a student-athlete's education may place them into contractual relationships, the court mentioned that Hendricks did not cite any contract from Clemson that promised eligibility maintenance. The court reinstated the trial court's summary judgment in light of these rulings and reversed the ruling from the Court of Appeals.

== Legal implications ==
The court's decision stated that colleges would risk more litigation should there be a duty legally established between advisors and students. In this case, Clemson was found to have voluntarily advised Hendricks on eligibility. Additionally, advisors and students do not enter into fiduciary relationships. This means that academic advising does not constitute a fiduciary service in this regard. The case also mentioned that colleges do not promise eligibility to their student-athletes, even though they might voluntarily advise their students to keep them eligible for NCAA competition.

== Related cases ==
Educational malpractice and negligence have been rejected in other court cases, with some of these cases involving the question of fiduciary duty. For example, in Ross v. Creighton University, a fiduciary relationship between the college and the student was rejected. In Ryan v. University of North Carolina Hospitals, a fiduciary relationship between "educator/supervisors and medical residents" was rejected. In a more recent case, Telluselle v. Hawaii Pacific University, plaintiff's negligence claim was rejected on the basis that there is "no duty is owed by academic advisors and institutions to students."

== See also ==
- Student rights in U.S. higher education
