= The Revolution Will Not Be Televised =

1970 song by Gil Scott-Heron

Single by Gil Scott-Heron

from the album Pieces of a Man
- A-side: "Home Is Where the Hatred Is"
- Released: 1971
- Recorded: April 19, 1971
- Studio: RCA Studios, New York City
- Genre: Jazz-funk; spoken word; proto-rap
- Length: 3:07
- Label: Flying Dutchman
- Songwriter: Gil Scott-Heron
- Producer: Bob Thiele

Gil Scott-Heron singles chronology
"The Revolution Will Not Be Televised" (1971)	"The Bottle" (1974)

Audio sample
- "The Revolution Will Not Be Televised": file; help

"The Revolution Will Not Be Televised" is a funk and spoken word protest song by American poet and musician Gil Scott-Heron. It was first released as a track on his debut live album Small Talk at 125th and Lenox (1970). In 1971, a version with added jazz-funk instrumentation was included on his debut studio album Pieces of a Man, and released as the B-side of his debut single, opposite "Home Is Where the Hatred Is".

Over a sparse instrumental centered on a funk drum beat, Scott-Heron, a Black man, reads a poem emblematic of the concurrent Black power movement against White supremacy in the United States. Labeling the movement a "revolution", he lists what "the revolution will not" be—mainly, supported by television and other mass media.

The song became Scott-Heron's most popular work, and it is seen by some critics as an early work of hip-hop. It was inducted into the Library of Congress' National Recording Registry in 2005, and has been listed by Rolling Stone as one of the "500 Greatest Songs" and "100 Best Protest Songs" of all time. It popularized its titular phrase, which had been a Black power slogan beforehand; it has been notably quoted by many rappers, including Kendrick Lamar at his Super Bowl halftime performance in 2025.

== Background ==
Gil Scott-Heron spent much of his childhood in Tennessee while Jim Crow laws in the Southern United States enforced racial segregation between Black and White people. He lived there with his grandmother, Lily Scott, who was an activist in the civil rights movement (1954–1968) against racial inequality in the U.S. She gifted him the works of Black writer Langston Hughes, which influenced Scott-Heron's future writing style. In the 1960s, he became one of three Black students to integrate his previously all-White local high school. He then attended Lincoln University near Philadelphia.

In the late 1960s, the civil rights movement, as well as American opposition to U.S. involvement in the Vietnam War, intensified, leading to major protest movements. Scott-Heron organized protests in support of student rights at Lincoln University, including better student health care. Television, a growing and relatively new medium, largely influenced the tense political environment. In 1950, ~6 million TV sets were in U.S. households, and it had increased to ~60 million in 1960. TV news broadcasting became Americans' most viewed news source. Programs which broadcast in-depth coverage of American soldiers' deaths and murders in Vietnam greatly weakened Americans' support for the war. New Histories, published by the University of Sheffield, writes:

"Indeed, the accumulated experience of watching the death of another Vietnamese child, jungles burning from chemical weapons, the body bags of American soldiers, stirred an angry, influential counterculture."

This counterculture created politically influential protest music; Paste magazine writes that "the civil rights movement both influenced and received reinforcement from" soul and funk music which advocated for racial equality. Such funk artists include Curtis Mayfield, James Brown, and Sly Stone.

== Writing ==
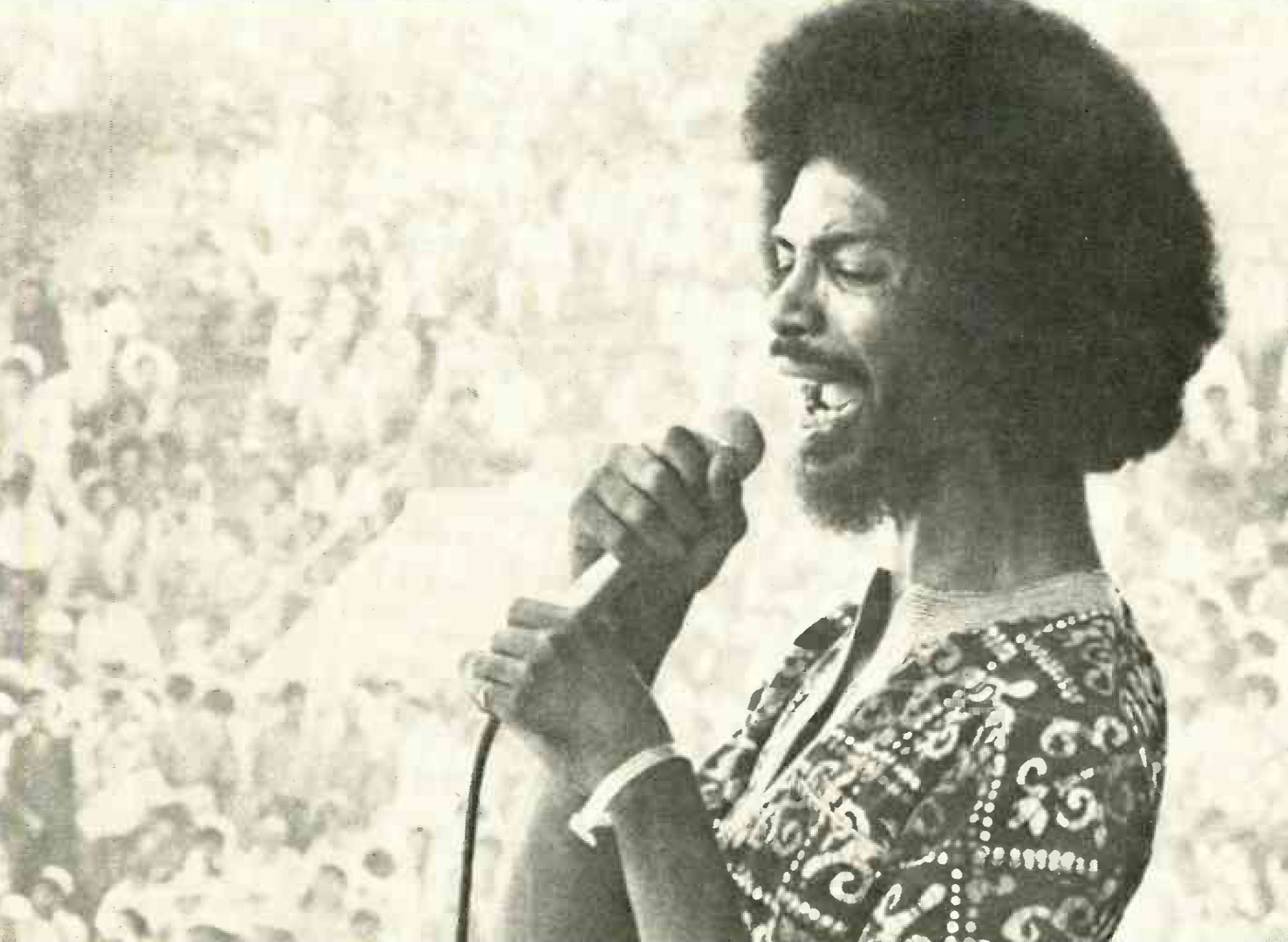
Gil Scott-Heron performing in 1975

While watching a series of Major League Baseball games between the New York Mets and Philadelphia Phillies from his dorm room TV at university in 1969, Scott-Heron wrote the first lyrics for "The Revolution Will Not Be Televised". Marcus Baram writes for the Library of Congress that, in making the poem, Scott-Heron "highlighted the disconnect between the consumerism celebrated on TV with the protests happening on the streets of America." His lyrics were influenced by the commercials that aired during the Mets–Phillies games, the wordplay in Langston Hughes' prose, and his mother Bobbie Scott-Heron's "acerbic wit".

The song is specifically a response to the spoken word piece "When the Revolution Comes" by The Last Poets (from their 1970 eponymous album), which opens with the line: "When the revolution comes, some of us will probably catch it on TV". Scott-Heron had invited The Last Poets to perform the song at Lincoln University a few months prior to his writing "The Revolution Will Not Be Televised".

== Recordings ==
In 1970, after dropping out of university in his second year, Scott-Heron published a novel, The Vulture. To promote it, he recorded and published Small Talk at 125th and Lenox, a live album of him performing spoken word poetry. He made the recording with Bob Thiele, a music producer who had worked with the era's most influential jazz musicians, such as John Coltrane and Louis Armstrong. The album contains the first released version of "The Revolution Will Not Be Televised".

On Small Talk, Scott-Heron recited the poem over an accompaniment of congas and bongo drums. A re-recorded version, with a three-piece band, was the B-side to Scott-Heron's first single, "Home Is Where the Hatred Is", from his album Pieces of a Man (1971). This recording was still sparsely instrumented, but now, in addition to drums, featured a driving bassline played by Ron Carter and, somewhat unconventionally, a jazz-infused flute line by Hubert Laws throughout, acting as a countermelody to Heron's passionately delivered spoken word vocal. This sparse and rhythm-driven backdrop to Heron's incisive vocal, held down by Bernard Purdie's tight and explosive funk drumming, and eschewing thick chordal accompaniment, foreshadowed musical developments in hip-hop in the decade to come.

The song was also included on Scott-Heron's compilation album, The Revolution Will Not Be Televised (1974). All these releases were issued on the Flying Dutchman Productions record label.

== Lyrics ==
Prior to Scott-Heron's song, its titular phrase had been used by militant Black power groups. In 1989, Scott-Heron expressed his view on the title.

The first change that takes place is in your mind. You have to change your mind before you change the way you live and the way you move. The thing that’s going to change people is something that nobody will ever be able to capture on film. It’s just something that you see and you’ll think, “Oh I’m on the wrong page,” or “I’m on I’m on the right page but the wrong note. And I’ve got to get in sync with everyone else to find out what’s happening in this country.”

— Gil Scott-Heron

In the poem, he names and references many celebrities, journalists, TV series, and advertising campaigns—among other elements of American popular culture—and says the Black power "revolution will not" be like those people, or do what those ads claim various products do. Through listing these, he portrays pop culture as having, Britannica writes, a "stupefying" and "pacifying effect on political activism". The National Civil Rights Museum views the poem as believing that "true change will not be brought to them by corporations, but rather through a change in one’s own mind and actions".

Each verse has several cultural references:

- "Plug in, turn on, and cop out", a play on LSD advocate Timothy Leary's pro-LSD slogan "Turn on, tune in, drop out."
- "Skag", a term for heroin
- Xerox, an American manufacturer of photocopiers (at the time)
- Then-U.S. president Richard Nixon
- John N. Mitchell, the U.S. Attorney General under Nixon
- General Creighton Abrams, one of the main commanders of the U.S. war effort in the Vietnam War
- Mendel Rivers, the chairman of the House Armed Services Committee during the Vietnam War; he is named in the 1970 recording—but not in the 1971 version, where he is replaced by Spiro Agnew, Nixon's vice president until resigning in 1973
- "Hog maws", a "soul food" made from the stomach of a pig
- Schaefer Award Theatre, a film anthology that aired on several American TV networks
- Natalie Wood, an American actress
- Steve McQueen, an American actor
- Bullwinkle, a character from the American TV cartoon The Adventures of Rocky and Bullwinkle and Friends
- Julia, the lead character of the American sitcom Julia, played by Diahann Carroll
- "Give your mouth sex appeal", an advertising slogan for Ultra Brite toothpaste
- "The revolution will not get rid of the nubs", referencing an ad for Gillette Techmatic razors—the "nubs" being beard stubble
- Willie Mays, a Black American baseball player
- "NBC will not be able to predict the winner at 8:32", a reference to TV networks, who, at the time, predicted the winner of U.S. presidential elections shortly after polls close on election day at 8 p.m.
- "Pigs", a pejorative for police officers
- Whitney Young, a Black American civil rights leader
- "Process", a term for using chemicals to straighten a Black person's hair
- Roy Wilkins, the executive director of the NAACP civil rights organization
- Watts, a neighborhood in Los Angeles, alluding to the 1965 Watts Riots by Black Angelenos over racist abuse by the Los Angeles Police Department
- "Red, black, and green", the colors of the Pan-African flag
- "...will no longer be so damned relevant": a statement of approval toward the 1970s "rural purge" that led to three American sitcoms getting cancelled:
  - Green Acres
  - The Beverly Hillbillies
  - Hooterville Junction—a misquoting of Petticoat Junction, using its fictional setting of Hooterville
- Dick and Jane, a White couple featured in American basal readers, who are used in the song as a term for generic White couples
- Search for Tomorrow, an American soap opera
- The Brighter Day, an American soap opera
- "Hairy-armed women liberationists", participants in second-wave feminism
- Jackie Onassis, the late U.S. president John F. Kennedy's widow
- Jim Webb, an American composer
- Francis Scott Key, the lyricist of the U.S.' national anthem, "The Star-Spangled Banner"
- Glen Campbell, an American pop/country music singer, and then-host of The Glen Campbell Goodtime Hour
- Tom Jones, a Welsh pop music singer, and then-host of This Is Tom Jones
- Johnny Cash, an American country music singer, and then-host of The Johnny Cash Show
- Engelbert Humperdinck, a British pop music singer, and then-host of The Engelbert Humperdinck Show
- Rare Earth, an American rock band, whose members were all-White, and who were signed to Motown Records, historically a promoter of Black musicians; the band is only named in the 1971 version
- "White tornado", referencing an ad slogan for Ajax cleaning product: "Ajax cleans like a white tornado"
- "White lightning", a term for moonshine; a 1950s country song by George Jones; and an American psychedelic rock band.
- "Dove in your bedroom", referencing advertising for Dove deodorant
- "Put a tiger in your tank", an ad slogan for the Esso oil and gas company (now Exxon)
- "Giant in your toilet bowl," referencing commercials for Liquid-Plumr chemical drain cleaner, which claimed the product cleared so well it was like "having a giant in your toilet bowl", with an animation of a large arm using a toilet plunger
- "Things go better with Coke", a Coca-Cola advertising slogan
- "Fights germs that may cause bad breath", an ad slogan for Listerine mouthwash
- "Will put you in the driver's seat", an ad slogan for the Hertz car rental agency

== Reception and legacy ==
The song was inducted into the Library of Congress' National Recording Registry in 2005. In 2021, it was ranked #258 on Rolling Stone's "500 Greatest Songs of All Time". In 2025, the publication ranked the song #14 on its list of "The 100 Best Protest Songs of All Time."

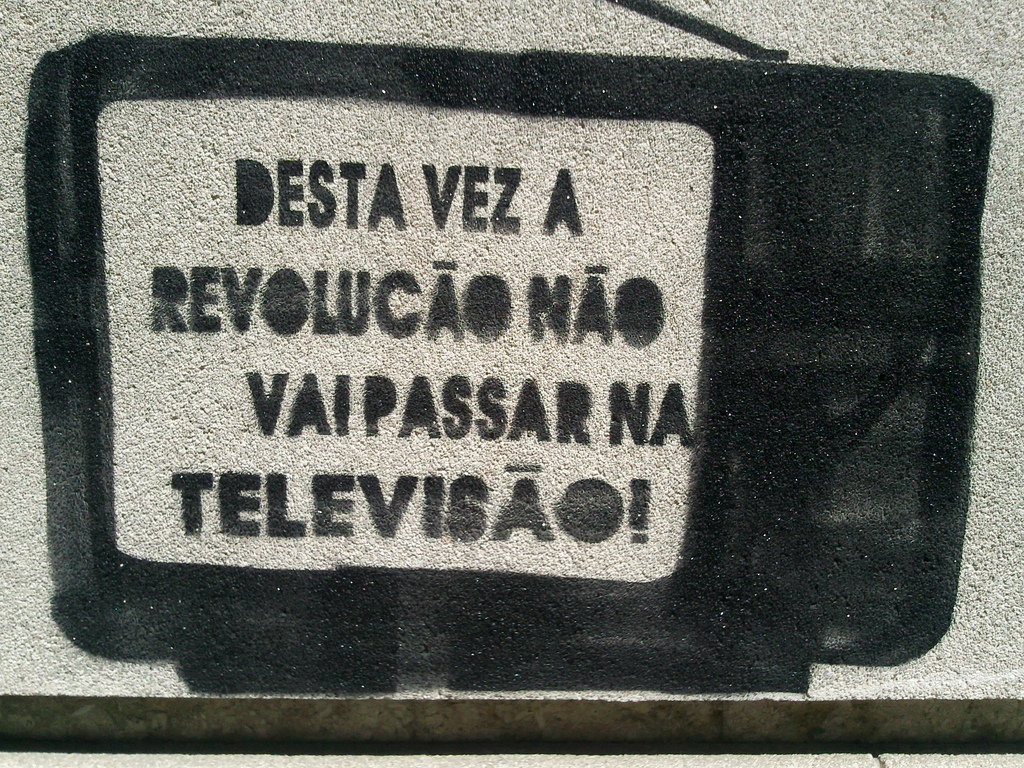
The titular phrase written in Portuguese, seen on street art in Porto, Portugal, in 2011

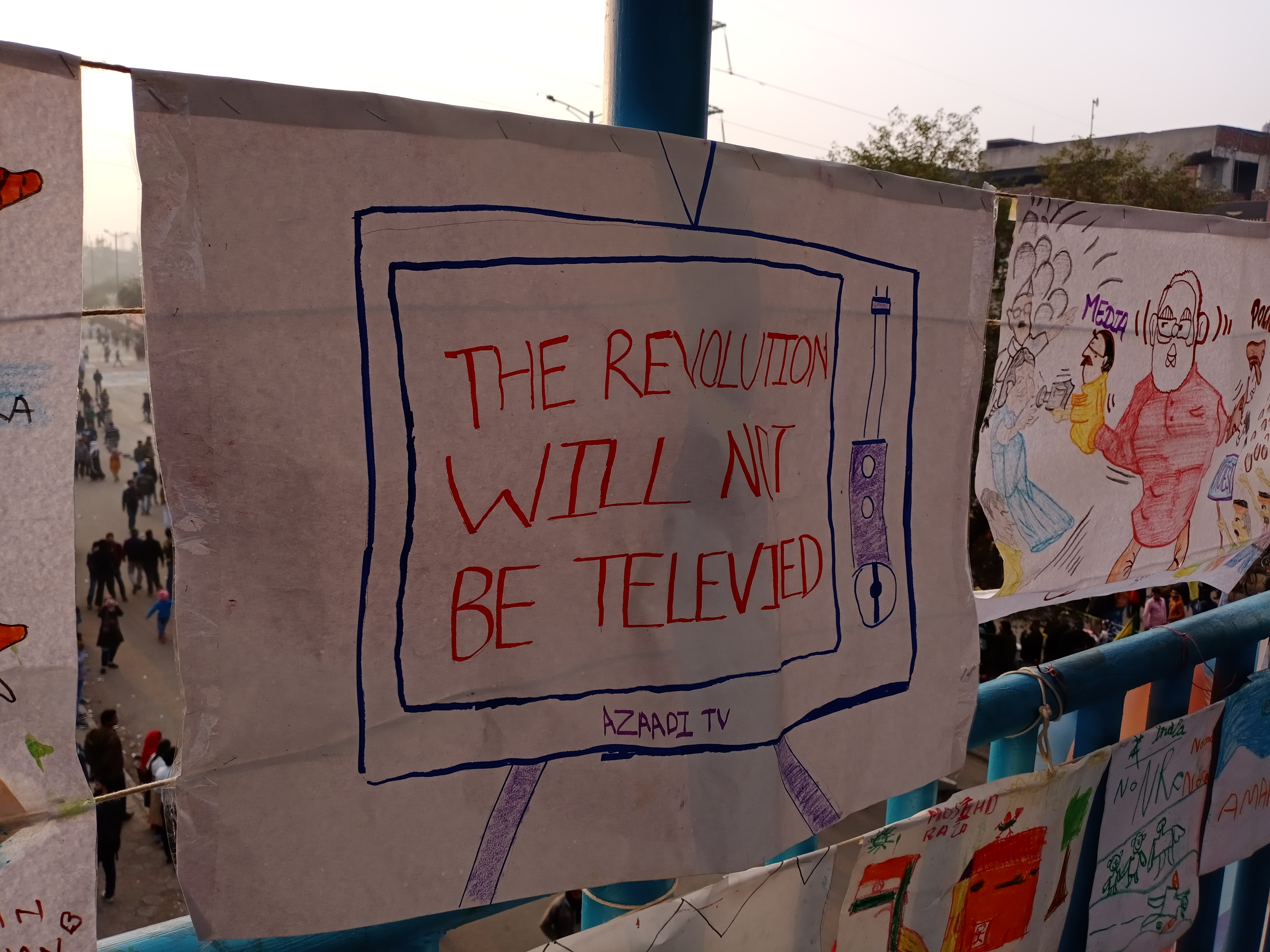
The phrase being displayed at the 2020 Shaheen Bagh protest in India

The song's titular phrase has been used as a major protest slogan in demonstrations across the world, such as in London in 1983, in the Greenham Common Women's Peace Camp protest against nuclear weapons; Cairo in 2011, in the Egyptian Revolution that overthrew Egypt's president Hosni Mubarak; New York City in 2011, in the Occupy Wall Street protests against economic inequality and financial crime in the U.S.; and Mumbai in 2019, in protests against India's Citizenship Act, which redefined Indian nationality law for migrants to the country.

During his Super Bowl LIX Halftime Show in New Orleans in 2025, rapper Kendrick Lamar referenced the poem, saying: "The revolution ’bout to be televised / You picked the right time but the wrong guy," before beginning his song "Squabble Up". Lamar also referenced the poem in his song "TV Off", from his album GNX (2024), with the line: "This revolution been televised, I fell through with the knick-knacks". Singer Beyoncé included a snippet of Scott-Heron's original recording in her 2025 Cowboy Carter Tour between the songs "My House" and "Diva".

The song is referenced throughout the 2025 film One Battle After Another, in which part of the lyrics are used as a countersign for former members of the group the French 75 and their associates to identify one another:

Green Acres, Beverly Hillbillies, and Hooterville Junction will no longer be so damn relevant. And women will not care if Dick finally got down with Jane on Search for Tomorrow. Because Black people will be in the street looking for a brighter day. The revolution will not be televised.

== See also ==
- Black Arts Movement
- (I Can't Get No) Satisfaction
- Whitey on the Moon
