= California Education Code 48907 =

California Student Free Expression Law

California State Legislature
- Citation: Cal. Educ. Code Sec. 48907
- Territorial extent: State of California
- Signed: 22 February 1977
- Status: In force

California Education Code 48907 (1977), also known as the California Student Free Expression Law, acts as a counter to the Hazelwood v. Kuhlmeier (1988) Supreme Court ruling, which limited the freedom of speech granted to public high school newspapers. Hazelwood v. Kuhlmeier held that public school curricular student newspapers that have not been established as "forums for student expression" are subject to a lower level of First Amendment protection than independent student expression or newspapers established (by policy or practice) as forums for student expression. Ed Code 48907 affirms the right of high school newspapers to publish whatever they choose, so long as the content isn't explicitly obscene, libelous, or slanderous, and doesn’t incite students to violate any laws or school regulations. The newspaper content must also pass the minimal disruption test set forth in the Supreme Court ruling on Tinker v. Des Moines (1969). In contrast with Hazelwood, which limited First Amendment protection to only those high school newspapers that had, through practice or policy, been established as forums for student expression, Ed Code 48907 affirms the right of all newspapers to the freedom of expression.

== Background ==
Many public high schools provide for a school-funded newspaper, most often the product of a journalism class taken for credit. As a recent Legal News Advisory issued by the California Department of Education noted, these newspapers exist mainly to teach students the elements of journalism and to supplement the language arts curriculum. However, the same advisory also noted that students have a legitimate interest in the full expression of their own ideas on topics of concern, even when those ideas are in conflict with or are critical of those of the school or the majority of the public. Following the landmark Supreme Court ruling in Tinker v. Des Moines, which asserted that students do not lose their free speech protections in school, students are allowed a degree of freedom of expression in school, even if these rights are justifiably less than those experienced out of the classroom.

However, the 1974 study commissioned by the Robert F. Kennedy Memorial, Captive Voices, found that censorship and the systematic lack of freedom to engage in open, responsible journalism characterize high school journalism. This study, which examined censorship issues, minority participation and journalism education, and the commercial media's involvement with scholastic journalism, also found that censorship of journalism is a matter of policy in all areas of the country despite legal protections that override such censorship. Importantly, the issue of self-censorship was found to have created passivity among students and made them cynical about the guarantees of a free press under the First Amendment.

As a counter to these suppressions and as a reaction to Tinker v. Des Moines, California became the first state in the United States to enact a statutory scheme that protected the free speech rights of students. These protections were codified in Educational Code 10611. In 1977, the California Legislature rewrote this code and replaced it with Educational Code 48907. This revision was prompted by Bright v. Los Angeles Unified School District (1976), in which the California Supreme Court found that Educational Code 10611 did not authorize prior restraint, and thus that a school could only discipline a student for violation of a publications rule or prohibit further distribution. However, Educational Code 10611 was not completely clear, and thus the Legislature replaced it with the current statute, 48907, which now states that prior restraint is allowed only when student expression violates the specific prohibitions of Section 48907.

== Text ==
The main text of the Code is as follows:

Students of the public schools including charter schools, shall have the right to exercise freedom of speech and of the press including, but not limited to, the use of bulletin boards, the distribution of printed materials or petitions, the wearing of buttons, badges, and other insignia, and the right of expression in official publications, whether or not such publications or other means of expression are supported financially by the school or by use of school facilities,

except that expression shall be prohibited which is obscene, libelous, or slanderous. Also prohibited shall be material which so incites students as to create a clear and present danger of the commission of unlawful acts on school premises or the violation of lawful school regulations, or the substantial disruption of the orderly operation of the school.

Each governing board of a school district and each county board of education shall adopt rules and regulations in the form of a written publications code, which shall include reasonable provisions for the time, place, and manner of conducting such activities within its respective jurisdiction.

Student editors of official school publications shall be responsible for assigning and editing the news, editorial, and feature content of their publications subject to the limitations of this section. However, it shall be the responsibility of a journalism adviser or advisers of student publications within each school to supervise the production of the student staff, to maintain professional standards of English and journalism, and to maintain the provisions of this section.

There shall be no prior restraint of material prepared for official school publications except insofar as it violates this section. School officials shall have the burden of showing justification without undue delay prior to any limitation of student expression under this section.

"Official school publications" refers to material produced by students in the journalism, newspaper, yearbook, or writing classes and distributed to the student body either free or for a fee.

Nothing in this section shall prohibit or prevent any governing board of a school district from adopting otherwise valid rules and regulations relating to oral communication by students upon the premises of each school.

An employee shall not be dismissed, suspended, disciplined, reassigned, transferred, or otherwise retaliated against solely for acting to protect a pupil engaged in the conduct authorized under this section, or refusing to infringe upon conduct that is protected by this section, the First Amendment to the United States Constitution, or Section 2 of Article I of the California Constitution.

== Specific provisions ==
School authorities can only prohibit publication of stories in school newspapers if they are obscene, libelous, slanderous, or likely to incite others to commit illegal or disruptive acts. Additionally, school districts may not censor, even if the above conditions are met, if the district has not adopted in written form rules and regulations including reasonable provisions for the time, place, and manner in which issues of censorship may be addressed or settled. Thus, even if material falls within the realm of obscene, defamatory, illegal, or disruptive, all reasonable restrictions on school newspapers, school officials may not censor student material simply because no written school district regulations governing publications exist.

Also, a school district rule which generally prohibits such potentially sensitive topics as pregnancy and divorce is not permitted by the statute.

In issues of school liability, often stemming from libel or defamation lawsuits, the majority opinion in Leeb v. DeLong (1988) stated that to impose a prior restraint requires the article to contain a "false statement ... likely to harm the reputation of another ..." and cannot be allowed "to hinge on the subjective pique" of a prospective plaintiff. This again holds the school to a high level of free speech protection before being allowed to censor.

Additionally, Leeb v. DeLong holds that a lack of "professional standards of English and journalism" is not justification for prior restraint; post-publication responses are the only way to maintain these standards.

== Recent usage ==
This policy and Education Code 48907 was supported by the case Smith v. Novato Unified School District (2007). A California Court of Appeal found that school unlawfully disciplined by condemning a controversial editorial as a violation of school policy and stating it should not have been published. The editorial, titled "Immigration," contained extremely controversial statements about illegal immigrants. The principal, soon after the newspaper's release, ordered that all remaining copies of the newspaper no longer distributed. Smith sued the school district, and the Marin County Superior Court ruled against him; however, the First District Court of Appeal reversed the decision, stating that Code 48907 prohibits schools from censoring speech simply "because it presents controversial ideas and opponents of the speech are likely to cause disruption."

== See also ==
- Leonard Law
- Student Press Law Center
- Student rights
