= Students & Administration Equality Act =

The Students & Administration Equality Act, commonly known as "The SAE Act", is a law that guarantees a student or student organization in higher education institutions the right to hire a lawyer when facing disciplinary proceedings. It is codified as N.C. Gen. Stat. § 116-40.11. The law was originally conceived in North Carolina when legislation passed in the 2013 Session of the North Carolina General Assembly. Most college administrators have written policies that disallow an attorney to be involved in the disciplinary process. In 2015 Arkansas and North Dakota joined NC in passing bills that give students due process protections by having the right to legal counsel when involved with charges of non-academic misconduct.

Massachusetts is considering legislation that allows students the right to have a lawyer during the disciplinary proceedings. Sponsors are Senator Barbara L'Italien (D) and Representatives Mary Keefe (D), Kay Khan (D), and Brian Mannal (D).

== North Carolina ==
On May 15, 2013 the NC House lawmakers voted in favor of the bill by 112 to 1. The final version was strengthen before being passed by the NC General Assembly on July 26, 2013 and was signed by Governor Pat McCrory making North Carolina the first state in the nation to enact such legislation.

The bill was authored by Representative John Bell (R) and cosponsored by Representatives Rick Glazier (D), Nathan Baskerville (D), and Jonathan Jordan (R). The law allows any student or student organization that is accused of any violation of conduct at a state university or community college in North Carolina the right to be represented by an attorney during any point of the disciplinary process regarding the investigation or charge of misconduct. Prior to this law administrative proceedings had written policies that denied students the right to legal counsel when interacting with administrators.

The University of North Carolina System opposed the legislation and had their legal counsel speak in opposition to the bill at a Hearing before the NC House Rules committee. Speaking in favor of the legislation was the Foundation for Individual Rights in Education (F.I.R.E) who also had a representative speak before the NC House Rules Committee during their Hearing. The Rules committee voted unanimously to give the bill a favorable report.

The Association for Student Conduct Administration (ASCA), fought against the legislation before its passage. The ASCA is an organization whose dues paying membership is primarily college administrators and touts itself as the "premier authority in higher education for student conduct administration and conflict resolution".

Original proponents of the law were students at the University of North Carolina Wilmington that were members of a student organization that desired legal counsel when facing university administrators in a disciplinary hearing. The student affairs department and the dean of students denied the students the right to have a lawyer represent them at a campus tribunal. The students claimed many of their due process rights were violated and sought remedy by appealing to the NC General Assembly to pass legislation to protect student rights.

== Arkansas ==
Arkansas became the second state to allow legal representation in non-academic disciplinary proceedings when HB 1892 was passed with bipartisan support in April 2015. The bill was sponsored by Representative Grant Hodges (R) and Representative Warwick Sabin (D).

== North Dakota ==
North Dakota became the third state to provide students due process protections by granting students and student organizations the right to hire legal representation when contesting non-academic disciplinary allegations at public educational institutions. The bill was approved by the House of Representatives by a unanimous 92–0 vote then passed the state Senate on a 44–1 vote. Governor Jack Dalrymple signed SB 2150 into law on April 22, 2015. The bill was sponsored by Senators Ray Holmberg, Kelly Armstrong, and Jonathan Casper; and Representatives Lois Delmore, Mary Johnson, and Diane Larson.

== See also ==
- Student rights
- Due Process
- Due Process Clause
