= Student rights in higher education =

Student rights are those rights, such as civil, constitutional, contractual and consumer rights, which regulate student rights and freedoms and allow students to make use of their educational investment. These include such things as the right to free speech and association, to due process, equality, autonomy, safety and privacy, and accountability in contracts and advertising, which regulate the treatment of students by teachers and administrators. There is very little scholarship about student rights throughout the world. In general most countries have some kind of student rights (or rights that apply in the educational setting) enshrined in their laws and proceduralized by their court precedents. Some countries, like Romania, in the European Union, have comprehensive student bills of rights, which outline both rights and how they are to be proceduralized. Most countries, however, like the United States and Canada, do not have a cohesive bill of rights and students must use the courts to determine how rights precedents in one area apply in their own jurisdictions.

== Canada ==
Canada, like the United States, has a number of laws and court precedents which regulate higher education and provide student rights. The Canadian Encyclopedia, which details issues of Canadian life and governance, states that in Canada "Basically two sorts of rights apply to students: substantive rights – the actual rights that students should enjoy – and procedural rights – methods by which students claim their rights. This article is concerned with students in public institutions, although those in private schools can claim rights under the common law and provincial education Acts."

Canada does not yet have a national student Bill of Rights or comparable document. If and when one is put in place in Canada it is likely that this document will be called a Charter of Student Rights and Freedoms. The Canadian Charter of Rights and Freedoms is equivalent to the National Bill of Rights in the United States. The Canadian national student union or government is the Canadian Federation of Students and it has not put forth any such bill.

== France ==
=== Privacy rights ===
- Right to privacy in higher education

In the AlBaho Case, a French criminal court found three senior academics at the École Supérieure de Physique et de Chimie Industrielles de la Ville de Paris (ICPSE) guilty of email espionage. This was the first incident where academic staff were found guilty of a criminal act as a result of a complaint made by a student – and where those staff members had the full support of their institution.

== United States ==
Student Rights in United States Higher Education

== Romania ==
Romania is the country with the greatest student rights legislation currently in place. In 2011 the National Alliance of Student Organizations in Romania, which is also part of the European Student Union, worked with the Romanian National Government to bring into law the Romanian National Student Code of Rights and Responsibilities. This document provides Romanian students with roughly a hundred theoretical and procedural rights necessary to ensure theoretical rights are fulfilled. This document includes the following rights:

=== Educational package rights ===
- Right to a quality education
- Right to a student centered educational environment
- Right to opportunities to develop personally
- Right to opportunities to develop socially
- Right to opportunities to acquire skills required to find and retain employment
- Right to an educational contract
- Right to equal treatment among equal students
- Right to equity where some students are at an educational disadvantage
- Right to information transparency and accessibility
- Right to educational quality standards which are assessed and accountable
- Right to student involvement in institutional decision-making
- Right to at least one free copy of the student record including diplomas, certificates and transcripts
- Right to information on all student rights and responsibilities
- Right to grievance reporting, hearing and appeals processes
- Right to be provided educational materials while attending institutions of higher education
- Right to housing accommodations, unless a student studies in their place of residence
- Right to transportation while attending institutions of higher education
- Right to meals while attending institutions of higher education
- Right to medical coverage while attending institutions of higher education
- Right to postpone and resume studies
- Right to transfer from one university to another
- Right to the protection of student information
- Right to an eight-hour school day

=== Contract rights ===
- Right to a continuous contract during a period of enrollment, without a change in degree requirements
- Right to retain property and copyright for results of research, artistic creation and innovation unless contracts exist
- Right to participate in programs and services in accordance with advertised program objectives
- Right to be evaluated in accordance with advertised curriculum evaluation criteria
- Right to be evaluated with criteria in line with advertised course objectives

=== Equitability rights ===
- Right to equitable recruitment, admissions, readmissions, testing, education, instruction and assessment
- Right to access social mobility programs and resources
- Right to subsidized tuition for students from historically marginalized and low socio-economic backgrounds
- Right to free educational and professional guidance, counseling, tutoring and monitoring for subsidized students
- Right to the availability of academic, professional psychological and social counseling with educational objectives
- Right to study in one's native language or a language of international communication if offered
- Right to exam accommodations for certified temporary and permanent medical conditions
- Right to have registration periods of at least on working week after the posting of scholarships or programs
- Right to flexible learning paths and a minimum number of optional courses
- Right to be provided free medical assistance
- Right to a 50% + discount on public transportation
- Right to a 75% discount for access to events organized by public institutions
- Right to subsidies for housing accommodations for low income or historically marginalized backgrounds

=== Accountability and quality assurance rights ===
- Right to a quality education (with quality standards in place)
- Right to quality standards for teachers and course resources for use in quality assurance and evaluation
- Right to quality standards for support resources for use in quality assurance and evaluation
- Right to the availability of information related to stated educational objectives
- Right to participate in evaluation of teachers, courses, seminars, programs, practicums, internships, residencies
- Right to access teacher, course, seminar, program, practicum, internship, residency evaluations as public info
- Right to have evaluations used for assessment of quality and objective achievement
- Right to know how tuition, fees and other charges are determined or justified
- Right to be informed about the number, type and amount of each fee charged
- Right to institutional consultation with student organizations on issues in higher education
- Right to representative participation in university executive and deliberative bodies
- Right to 25%+ representative participation in the university senate and faculty council
- Right to representative participation in faculty counsels and university senates or governance structures
- Right to representative participation in management of social services, accommodations and scholarships
- Right to representatives participation in government departments involving students
- Right to representative participation in choosing and appointing an institutional president or head
- Right to student representative elections free of interference from instructors and administrators
- Right to serve as a student representative for up to four years regardless of academic performance or attendance
- Right to be informed and consulted by student representatives on matters in institutional governance
- Right for student organizations to develop an annual report on institutional compliance with this code
- Right to an annual response to the compliance report including proposed improvements and a timeline

=== Due process rights ===
- Right to submit grievances and expect recourse for identity theft
- Right to submit grievances and expect recourse for abuse of power
- Right to submit grievances and expect recourse for arbitrary and capricious decision making
- Right to appeal grades before a committee. The instructor who issued the grade may not sit on this committee.
- Right to request a review of complaints by specialized bodies
- Right to be present during appeal hearings
- Right to protection from retribution when making a complaint (whistle blower protections)
- Right to have all written or online requests registered
- Right to have all written and online requests answered

=== Information accessibility rights ===
- Right to freely access all educational materials available in university libraries or institutional websites
- Right to receive, upon admissions, a Student Guide containing information on:
  - student rights and responsibilities
  - materials and services provided by the university
  - evaluation methods
  - justification and methods used to establish fees
  - university and faculty facilities
  - details about student organizations
  - ways of accessing scholarships and other financial facilities
- Right to receive a five-page syllabus within the first two weeks of the semester containing:
  - course objectives
  - general competences or outcomes students will achieve
  - curriculum
  - course timeline of readings and assignments
  - evaluation and examination methods
- Right to adherence to the syllabus unless the teacher has the students' agreement
- Right to receive the syllabus in either an electronic format or a physical copy
- Right to information on the scale used for evaluation of skills
- Right to institutional policies which inform students of their rights
- Right to access regulations, decisions, meeting minutes and any other legal documents at the institution
- Right to receive a copy of their diploma, thesis, score and details about the score
- Right to information on criteria and methods used to identify and evaluate processional practice
- Right to information on criteria used to evaluate the quality of academic classes and programs

== The student rights movement ==
Students in both Europe and North America began calling for the expansion of civil rights and student rights during the Vietnam War era. They established legal rights by forming student unions and lobbying for institutional policies (thus, changing the cultural treatment of students), lobbying for legislative change on state and national levels and circulating petitions for the creation of national student rights bills. In America, for instance, students won the right to retain their civil rights in institutions of higher education. In Europe, this movement has been explosive. Students have banded together and formed unions in individual institutions, at the state and national levels and eventually at the continental level as the European Student Union. They have been instrumental in lobbying for rights in individual countries and in the EU in general. In 2011, for instance, Romania put forth an extensive national student bill of rights providing Romanian students with a hundred rights assembled in a clear and easy to access document. Europe has also set forth legislation stipulating the rights of EU students studying in other EU countries.

European students have used the tactics established during the global labour movement of the eighteen and nineteen hundreds to gain labour or work place standards. They have unionized, stated their demands both verbally and in writing (sometimes in the form of a proposed student bill of rights), publicized their message and gone on strike. During the labor movement, workers in the United States, for example, won the right to a 40-hour work week, to a minimum wage, to equal pay for equal work, to be paid on time, to contract rights, for safety standards, a complaint filing process etc. Students have, likewise, demanded that these regulations as well as civil, constitutional, contract and consumer rights, which regulate other industries, be applied to higher education.

The European student movement and the United States movement differ in a number of ways. These differences may be a factor in determining why European Students have been more successful in obtaining legally recognized student rights, from the right to access free education to the right to move and study freely from one EU country to the next, to the right to exercise their national legal rights in institutions of higher education.

=== Differences between European and United States student movements ===
- National student organization mandates: Different levels of student representation

The European Student Union ESU mandate requires the ESU to determine the demands of students and to convey them to legislators. The United States Student Association USSA also has a mandate to amplify the student voice in legal decision making but it does not stipulate how it will determine the student voice or ensure that it is representative of the students themselves. The ESU focuses on gathering input from students across the nation, creates a student bill of rights enabling students to critique it, proposes legislation to achieve these rights at both the state and continental level and then creates information resources so students know their rights. The USSA, determines its objectives through the USSA membership. USSA does not seem to conduct research across the nation or to state student objectives on their website so students can express a desire to add or delete from this list. If the USSA does conduct research they do not show this on their website, do not have a search function on the website and do not publish this information for students.

- Currently, the ESU mandate is to "promote the educational, social, economic and cultural interests of students", to "represent, defend and strengthen students' educational, democratic and political and social rights and "represent and promote the[m] ... at the European [continental] level towards all relevant bodies and in particular the European Union, Bologna Follow Up Group, Council of Europe and UNESCO." The ESU will accomplish this by "conducting research", "campaigns", "conferences", "trainings", "partnership projects", "providing information", and creating "publications" for "students, policy-makers and higher education professionals".
- The ASSU's mandate is to "develop[] current and future leaders and amplif[y] the student voice at the local, state, and national levels by mobilizing grassroots power to win concrete victories on student issues. The United States Student Association Foundation ensures the pipeline of effective student leadership by facilitating education, training and other development opportunities at national, state, and local levels in advocating for issues that affect students." The mission statement does not say how they intend to do these things but it seems from the website that they hold grass roots lobbying, student conferences and electoral training, and propose bills to the US Senate.

- National student organization mandates: Publicity for student demands

The ESU clearly states student demands through the nation and through the EU. They have compiled these demands into a student bill of rights, referred to as the 2008 Student Rights Charter. This document is not legally binding but it is a clear representation of all student demands. It helps students, institutions and governments understand what students are demanding and also helps student unions, in individual institutions, lobby for rights which help change the culture and treatment of students on a local level. The ESU has democratically created a proposed student bill of rights they want accepted in legislation at a national and continental level. These demands include: access to higher education, to student involvement in institutional governance, extracurricular support and curricular quality standards. Each right has been broken down into more detailed demands required to achieve these rights. While student associations in America are pushing for this, there has been no centralized effort through the national student association.

USSA Legislative initiatives have included student debt forgiveness, enabling undocumented immigrant students to attend college, allocating more governmental money toward institutions and students but again these objectives seem to be created by USSA members without national research on the student voice. There is no way to search their website to determine if they conduct research to gather input form students across the nation.

- Institutional student bodies: A student union focus vs. a student government focus.

The European student movement and the United States movement also differ on a local institutional level. In Europe most institutional student organizations are referred to as student unions which suggests that they are engaged in lobbying for student rights. In America these are referred to as Student Governments or Student Associations and the focus is more on learning the democratic process. The problem is, however, that most student governments only have about 20-25% representation in the Academic Senate or institutional decision making body and far less experience in democratic processes than other institutional representatives. Student governments focus on teaching students how to be leaders and participate in democracy where as unions focus more on determining the student voice and achieving student rights through lobbying.

== See also ==
- European Students' Union
- Student bill of rights
- Youth rights
- Student voice
- Student Press Law Center
- National Youth Rights Association
- Leonard Law
- Student activism
- Students' union
- The Freechild Project
- Youth
- Youth suffrage
- Youth rights
- Age of candidacy
