= National Student Lobby =

Legislative advocacy organization

- Predecessor: National Student Association
- Merged into: National Student Association
- Successor: United States Student Association
- Founded: 1971; 55 years ago in Berkeley, California
- Founder: Peter Coye
- Defunct: 1978; 48 years ago
- Type: Student lobbying organization
- Location: Berkeley, California, U.S.
- Region served: United States
- Executive Director: Layton Olson

The National Student Lobby (NSL) was a national legislative advocacy group based in Washington, D.C. It was founded in 1971 as a breakaway organization from the National Student Association (NSA).

== History ==
In 1971, a faction of National Student Association members from California broke away from the organization due to dissatisfaction with what they perceived as the NSA's limited emphasis on real legislative efforts. They established the National Student Lobby to advocate at both state and federal levels, particularly concerning issues like economic access to higher education, as well as "airfare discounts, abolition of the draft, the minimum wage, and limiting Presidential war powers."

In March 1972, According to The New York Times, the NSL sent "more than 300 students from 39 states, half of whom are registered lobbyists, [who] spent [two days] speaking to their Senators and Congressmen about increased funding for the recently passed higher education bill, which has yet to be cleared by conferees."

In 1974, in response to the NSL's formation, the National Student Association established a separate foundation for non-political activities. This strategic move facilitated greater involvement in lobbying efforts and fostered collaboration with the NSL.

Subsequently, in August 1978, a joint meeting between the two groups resulted in a resounding approval for a merger, leading to the formation of the United States Student Association (USSA). Leadership positions were filled from both the NSA and the NSL, and — prompted by the National Third World Student Coalition (now known as the National People of Color Student Coalition) — new guidelines were implemented to ensure the diversity of campus delegations.
