= National Alliance of Student Organizations in Romania =

The National Alliance of Student Organizations in Romania (Romanian: Alianţa Naţională a Organizaţiilor Studenţeşti din România - ANOSR) is the largest national-level student federation in Romania. It represents 115 organizations from cities across the country. ANOSR has played a crucial role in defending students' rights and representing local organizations at a national level.

== Members ==
The associations which are members of ANOSR implement generic projects for student movement from Romania.

== National activity ==
ANOSR is involved in the development of educational and youth policy at national level, formulating and supporting students' positions and offering member organizations support regarding the implementation of these policies at a local level. It is a dialogue partner of the Ministry of Education, Youth and Sport, and a member of the National Council for the Reform of Higher Education.

== International relations ==
ANOSR is affiliated with the ESU - European Students' Union (The National Federation of Student Organizations in Europe), which, since 2002, has been the only national student organization in Romania. Also, ANOSR attended the Global Cooperation's Students Summit, the first event to bring student leaders from around the world together, after which the basis of student cooperation was established worldwide.

In 2008, Ligia Deca, ex-President of ANOSR, was elected president of the Federation of Student Organizations in Europe, the first student from Eastern Europe to hold this position. She was re-elected in April 2009 (until May 2010) for a new term, leading more than 11 million students from Europe. In 2012, ANOSR was the host of the General Meeting of ESU with 300 student representatives from across Europe gathered in Bucharest, in 2015, ANOSR hosted the same event in Cluj-Napoca. In 2015, Cristi Popescu, former president of ANOSR, was elected as a member of the executive committee of European Students' Union.
