= R. Gordon Hoxie =

American academic

Ralph Gordon Hoxie (March 18, 1919 – October 23, 2002) was an American educator and college administrator who served as chancellor of Long Island University in the 1960s and founded the Library of Presidential Papers (later known as the Center for the Study of the Presidency), after he resigned from LIU.

Hoxie was born in Waterloo, Iowa and earned his undergraduate degree in 1940 from Iowa State Teachers College, which is now known as the University of Northern Iowa. During World War II, Hoxie served as a captain in the United States Army Air Forces and attained the rank of brigadier general as a reserve officer. After completing his military service, he earned graduate degrees from the University of Virginia and Columbia University, and served as an administrator at the University of Denver and C. W. Post College.

Long Island University chose Hoxie as the dean of its College of Liberal Arts and Sciences of Long Island University in 1954 and after a series of promotions was named the school's chancellor in 1964. By 1967, a conflict had arisen between Hoxie and William Birenbaum the vice president and provost of LIU's Brooklyn Center. Hoxie, described by The New York Times as an "educational traditionalist", had sought to raise tuition as a means of dealing with the college's mounting debt burden, while Birenbaum supported keeping lower tuition and approved changes that eliminated a dress code and allowed students to have a beard. In March 1967, Hoxie demanded Birenbaum's resignation, despite the fact that the faculty had voted by a nearly 4–1 margin to keep him as provost. 1,500 students gathered to mount what turned out to be an unsuccessful protest demanding that Birenbaum be reinstated, chanting "We want Bill" and physically confronting Hoxie, who was rescued by campus police after protesters had ripped his coat. Hoxie told students that "This is a day of infamy in the life of the student body". Hoxie was asked to resign in September 1968 by the board of trustees.

After leaving LIU, Hoxie founded the Library of Presidential Papers, an organization that was later named the Center for the Study of the Presidency and which studies the American presidency, publishing the journal Presidential Studies Quarterly for historians.

Hoxie died at the age of 83 on October 23, 2002, at his home in Oyster Bay Cove, New York. He was survived by Ada Hoxie, his second wife. His first wife, Louise L. Hoxie, had died on December 14, 1992.
