= William Birenbaum =

American educator (1923–2010)

- William Birenbaum at his inauguration as President of Staten Island Community College. September 30, 1969.
- Born: July 18, 1923; Macomb, Illinois, US
- Died: October 4, 2010 (aged 87); New York City, US
- Education: University of Chicago Law School (JD)

William Marvin Birenbaum (July 18, 1923 – October 4, 2010) was an American educator and college administrator who served in leadership positions at the New School for Social Research, Long Island University and at Staten Island Community College (since renamed as the College of Staten Island), and received national attention for his efforts to address financial difficulties during his term as president of Antioch College. He also served as president of the National Student Association.

== Life ==
Birenbaum was born on July 18, 1923, in Macomb, Illinois. He was raised in Waterloo, Iowa and enrolled at the Iowa State Teachers College (later the University of Northern Iowa) until he enlisted in the United States Army Air Forces during World War II. After completing his military service, he attended the University of Chicago Law School where he completed a J.D. degree. After serving as dean of students at the University of Chicago from 1947 to 1957, Birenbaum moved to Wayne State University, where he was an assistant vice president and served as chairman of the Michigan Cultural Commission. In 1961, he was named as dean of the New School for Social Research.

Starting in 1964, Birenbaum was the vice president and provost at Long Island University's Brooklyn Center. In that role he supported keeping lower tuition and approved changes that eliminated a dress code and allowed students to have a beard. He was opposed in these efforts by the traditionalist chancellor R. Gordon Hoxie who had sought to raise tuition as a means of dealing with the college's mounting debt burden. Hoxie demanded Birenbaum's resignation in March 1967, despite the fact that the faculty had voted by a nearly 4–1 margin to keep him as provost. 1,500 students gathered to mount what turned out to be an unsuccessful protest against Birenbaum's dismissal, chanting "We want Bill" and physically confronting Dr. Hoxie. The sequence of events, on the other hand, eventually resulted in Hoxie being asked to resign in September 1968 by the board of trustees. Birenbaum served as president of Staten Island Community College from 1968 to 1976.

After considering 337 candidates in its search, Birenbaum was named as president of Antioch College in April 1976. The chairman of the search committee called him a "courageous and charismatic personality" who is an "experienced chief executive with a strong track record in crisis-type settings." By 1979, The New York Times described tensions on campus due to the school's dire financial crisis and that Birenbaum's "pugnacious and often abrasive style had offended many Antiochians", with enrollment at the Yellow Springs, Ohio campus dropping from 2,000 to 1,000 during the 1970s. Birenbaum implemented cost-cutting measures including a cut in the number of satellite campus programs nationwide from 30 down to under 10 and established Antioch University as a parent for its multiple campuses. By November 1980, The New York Times was able to report in a headline of an article about the college that "A Streamlined Antioch Appears on the Way to Survival". Birenbaum announced in June 1984 that he would be retiring and Alan E. Guskin of the University of Wisconsin–Parkside was named to succeed him as of September 1, 1985.

== Death ==
A resident of Brooklyn and Wellfleet, Massachusetts, Birenbaum died at the age of 87 on October 4, 2010, due to heart failure at his New York City home. He was survived by his wife, the former Helen Bloch, as well as by a daughter, a son and four grandchildren. His daughter Susan Birenbaum died in 2008.

== Bibliography ==
Birenbaum was the author of the 1969 book Overlive: Power, Poverty, and the University and the 1971 text Something for Everybody Is Not Enough: An Educator's Search for His Education. In a 1972 CBC documentary, Dr. Birenbaum comments on controversial independent scholar Immanuel Velikovsky and how such scholarship could be a natural part of the academic curriculum.

== Legacy ==
The William M. Birenbaum Papers were donated by Helen Birenbaum in 2012 to the Archives and Special Collections Department of the Library at the College of Staten Island (CUNY). The William M. Birenbaum Collection 1946-1985 documents his career.
