= Award Theatre =

Award Theatre (also known by its full title, Schaefer Award Theatre) was a recurring television showcase of major first-run motion pictures aired between 1959 and 1968, and revived briefly in 1970. In New York City, the program ran primarily on WCBS-TV (Channel 2), except for two occasions in 1970 when it was shown on WNBC-TV (Channel 4). This special series was sponsored by Schaefer Beer, and each film run under this banner was shown with only four commercial interruptions. On WCBS-TV, this show was aired in place of their usual late-night umbrella, The Late Show, while the two WNBC-TV airings in 1970 were shown in place of that station's late-night weekend movie show, Sunday Film Festival.

On its original 1959–68 run, the program was scheduled at or before major holidays such as Easter, Memorial Day, Independence Day, Labor Day, Thanksgiving Day, and Christmas. For all but its first two years, Award Theatre was shown nine times a year. On the short-lived 1970 revival, it was aired once a month. For much of Award Theatre's run, its on-air host was CBS staff announcer Bill Gilliand.

Award Theatre was also shown in some other major cities in the United States, such as on WCAU-TV (Channel 10) in Philadelphia, WBZ-TV (Channel 4) in Boston, KYW-TV (Channel 3, now WKYC) in Cleveland, and, in later years, WJRT-TV (Channel 12) in Flint, Michigan (where it aired Sunday mornings), during this same period. The films aired under this umbrella in those cities may or may not have been the same as in New York.

== History ==
=== 1959–1968 ===
The genesis for Award Theatre began in 1959 when Schaefer Beer, through its advertising agency BBDO, bought air time for one night of WCBS-TV's The Late Show. The first showing under this special banner, of It Happened One Night on May 23, 1959, was successful enough to warrant a recurring series of Award Theatre showings of prestigious first-run movies. Three more such films were run in 1959, and six in 1960, before being set at a total of nine annual presentations from 1961 on.

Some of the highest ratings WCBS-TV attained for its late night movies were aired under the Award Theatre banner. In 1962, for example, the station's presentation of Mister Roberts brought channel 2 its highest ratings in the 11:15 PM time slot up to that point, scoring a 39.9 rating and an 80 share. This figure would be surpassed in 1964 when WCBS's Award Theatre screening of From Here to Eternity attained a 45.6 rating and an 85 share. It was estimated that the annual Award Theatre screenings netted an average of $1 million a year for WCBS-TV.

By 1968, however, the proliferation of movie showcases on the three television networks, plus an increasing scarcity of quality titles for local television stations, led Schaefer to end its ongoing Award Theatre presentations in December, after a total of 82 films shown over more than 9½ years. The final screening at that point was of the 1954 remake of Magnificent Obsession on December 21.

=== 1970 revival ===
But in early 1970, Schaefer resumed its occasional Award Theatre screenings. However, in contrast to the 1959–68 period where it was seen exclusively on WCBS-TV and scheduled to air around holiday times, the program was now seen once a month, and the beer maker divided its new airings between that station and WNBC-TV, with two films being shown on the latter station in the summer of 1970. In addition, while the earlier series of special screenings had films that were being shown for the first time on New York television, in 1970 the films selected were drawn from packages that included pictures which were previously aired on the networks. Also, in the case of WNBC-TV's airings, this was the second off-network airing for the films in question; for example, The Birds, which was shown under the Award Theatre umbrella on WNBC in August 1970, had previously aired on WABC-TV in November 1969. Schaefer ended Award Theatre for good in New York City after the airing of The Caine Mutiny on September 5, 1970 (however, it would air in other cities for a few more years, with some cities running the show as late as 1973). WCBS-TV attempted to revive this format in 1973 with special monthly airings of Showcase Theatre, sponsored by Miles Laboratories and likewise airing in a few other cities (such as WPVI-TV in Philadelphia and WGN-TV in Chicago); however, it only lasted less than a year.

== Influence ==
Schaefer's Award Theatre spawned a series of other movie shows on other stations in other cities that aired with little or no commercial interruption. In New York alone, for a few years in the early 1970s WOR-TV had such a movie show several times a year; at one point, these presentations were sponsored by Bounty paper towels. Another New York station, WPIX, ran top films (usually from the Samuel Goldwyn Studio) without commercial interruption on Sunday evenings, also in the early 1970s. The concept was carried on by WNEW-TV in the early to mid-1980s with The Channel 5 Movie Club.

The series is among several television series mentioned disparagingly in Gil Scott-Heron's 1970 spoken-word piece, "The Revolution Will Not Be Televised."
