= National Student Association =

Defunct confederation of college student governments

- Merged into: National Student Lobby
- Successor: United States Student Association
- Founded: 1947; 79 years ago at the University of Wisconsin
- Defunct: 1978; 48 years ago
- Type: Student government association
- Location: Washington, D.C., U.S.
- Region served: United States
- Key people: William Birenbaum, Margery Tabankin
- Subsidiaries: United States Student Press Association
- Secessions: National Student Lobby (1971)
- Funders: Funding from the CIA (1950s–1967)
- Formerly called: United States Student Association (1978)

The United States National Student Association (known as the National Student Association or NSA) was a confederation of college and university student governments in the United States that was in operation from 1947 to 1978.

NSA held annual national conferences attended by student leaders, especially student body presidents from their respective student governments. From the early 1960s, the NSA played a significant role in the student activism movement, advocating for a student-centric vision within American universities. Many founding members of Students for a Democratic Society began their involvement in national activism through NSA, and numerous students were introduced to civil rights and antiwar movements through NSA events.

The NSA was also American host for student Eurail and air passes, and for many years served as American students' representative to IATA, the International Air Transport Association.

In the early 1960s, the NSA housed the United States Student Press Association and its news agency, Collegiate Press Service. Both groups spun away as independent groups but eventually shut down as student-run organizations.

From the early 1950s until 1967, the international program of the NSA, and some of its domestic activities, were underwritten by clandestine funding from the Central Intelligence Agency.

== Founding and early years ==
In 1946, students from the United States and 37 other nations convened in Prague, Czechoslovakia, to establish the International Union of Students, a coalition representing national student unions. Despite the flourishing of robust national student organizations in the United States during the 1920s and 1930s, all had dissolved by the end of World War II, prompting American delegates to advocate for a fresh beginning upon their return.

As a result, the National Student Association was founded at a conference at the University of Wisconsin in 1947, and established its first headquarters not far from the campus in Madison. University of Chicago student William Birenbaum was an NSA co-founder, serving as the organization's first president and remaining active in its growth and development for many years. The NSA elected officers at its annual National Student Congress. The first elected President of the NSA was William B. Welsh, a veteran and student at Berea College in Kentucky. He later served as chief Administrative Aide to Vice President Hubert Humphrey.

NSA's early orientation centered on campus-related matters, aiming to fortify student governance, bolster civil liberties within American campuses, and broaden access to higher education. Notably, NSA's 1947 Student Bill of Rights emerged as a seminal document in American student history, articulating the principle that students deserved adult respect within the academic realm.

From its inception, NSA grappled with the question of whether to engage in political activism. While some members advocated for steering clear of political causes, others contended that addressing issues affecting students and national concerns was the association's prerogative. However, NSA faced challenges in delineating between "political" and "non-political" actions, encountering divisions within its ranks when it took a stand against school segregation in the United States and when it elected an African American, Ted Harris, as president in 1948.

Throughout the 1950s, NSA engaged in measured liberalism, condemning McCarthyism in 1951 and South African apartheid in 1953, albeit limited to its impact on higher education. Predictably, this cautious approach drew criticism from both ends of the political spectrum, with conservatives accusing NSA of Communist sympathies and the Communist Party USA branding it as fascist.

== Funding by the Central Intelligence Agency ==
During the 1950s, the NSA encountered financial challenges, leading to the elimination of three out of its five staff positions in 1951. Concurrently, with the onset of the Cold War, the U.S. government intensified its interest in student politics, especially upon recognizing that the International Union of Students had aligned with the Eastern Bloc.

In this milieu, the Central Intelligence Agency covertly provided financial support to NSA's international office in the early 1950s. From the early 1950s until 1967, the international program of the NSA, and some of its domestic activities, were underwritten by clandestine funding from the CIA. Over the course of more than a decade, a select group of NSA officers and staff collaborated closely with CIA officials, while other NSA leaders, particularly those focused solely on domestic issues, remained uninformed of these dealings. Although some individuals later alleged coercion in their cooperation, the majority were motivated by self-interest and a genuine belief in the government's objectives.

== Activities and fractures during the Civil Rights movement ==
Throughout the early 1960s, the NSA played a significant role in the burgeoning student activism movement, advocating for a student-centric vision within American universities. Beginning in the late 1950s, the NSA conducted an annual Southern Student Human Relations Seminar (SSHRS), educating Southern student leaders on issues relating to race and civil rights. In late 1959 the SSHRS leadership opened a year-round office in Atlanta, headed by Constance Curry, an alumna. When student sit-ins against segregation spread across the South in early 1960, Curry provided vital support to activists, and she later joined the executive committee of the Student Nonviolent Coordinating Committee (SNCC).

In August 1960, however, the NSA's convention in Minneapolis debated a motion to deny support to the fledgling SNCC. The motion was defeated following a standing ovation given to an intervention by Sandra Cason (Casey Hayden). She was recruited on the spot by Alan Haber for new, rival, campus organization Students for a Democratic Society (SDS), into which she was followed by other NSA delegates, including Tom Hayden, editor of the University of Michigan newspaper. Many founding members of SDS began their involvement in national activism through NSA, and numerous students were introduced to civil rights and antiwar movements through NSA events. Despite criticism from SNCC and SDS about NSA's moderate leadership, both organizations relied on NSA for support.

NSA faced increasing criticism, however, from conservative factions. In 1961, Young Americans for Freedom (YAF) attempted to seize control of NSA, claiming it was controlled by the "far left." A few years later, a group of mostly Southern schools left the NSA because of its stand on civil rights, forming the Association of Student Governments (ASG). (The ASG folded in 1971.)

In c. 1962, the NSA formed the United States Student Press Association (USSPA), a national organization of campus newspapers and editors. The USSPA in turn formed Collegiate Press Service (CPS), a national news agency for college publications. (The USSPA went defunct in c. 1971, with CPS becoming an independent entity.)

In 1966, a California Congressman criticized NSA's association with State Department funding for a trip to Vietnam by the NSA president, alleging it undermined American foreign policy.

By the mid-1960s, concerns about NSA's ties to the CIA arose among incoming officers, leading to efforts to sever these connections. By late 1966, CIA funding to NSA had significantly decreased.

Meanwhile, in 1965, the NSA opened an office at 2115 S Street NW in Washington, D.C.

== Revelation of the CIA connection ==
The story of the CIA's secret financing of the NSA was eventually exposed by Michael Wood, a former staffer, through an article published by Ramparts magazine in February 1967, sparking a national scandal. Despite this, it did not measurably damage the NSA's standing with student governments; the majority of the million-plus students that NSA claimed to "represent" were likely unaware of the organization. The NSA had concentrated its recruiting efforts on persuading the on-campus student governments, typically a handful of leaders, to formally affiliate. Only in rare instances did the NSA and its campus agents go directly to the student body for a vote of approval.

In August 1967, the NSA formally cut its ties with the CIA and began, for example, paying the mortgage on its offices in Washington, D.C. The organization remained in a brownstone on S Street, NW, for many years until its 1978 mergers with the National Student Lobby and the National Student Educational Fund.

== Renewed activist energy ==
Following the revelations, the NSA experienced a period of growth and transformation. During the 1967 Congress, a resolution endorsing the Black Power movement's struggle "by any means necessary" was passed, leading to NSA's withdrawal from membership in the International Union of Students it had helped establish. Delegates reaffirmed the association's dedication to student empowerment and university reform, receiving applause when a network television commentator described NSA as "a left-wing radical outfit."

At the same Congress, an extraordinary campaign was launched, orchestrated by Allard K. Lowenstein, a former NSA president and Democratic activist. This initiative aimed to prevent Lyndon B. Johnson's renomination for President in 1968 and replace him with a candidate committed to ending the Vietnam War. Known as the "Dump Johnson movement", it paved the way for antiwar candidacies by Eugene McCarthy and Robert F. Kennedy for President of the United States, ultimately leading to LBJ's surprising announcement in early 1968 that he would not seek re-election.

== Later activities ==
The NSA, after initially neglecting certain groups, began to broaden its outreach in the late 1960s and early 1970s, incorporating workshops on gay rights and pledging support to activists of color. Internal tensions, however, arose amidst radicalization and societal upheaval. The National Association of Black Students (NASB) broke off from NSA in 1969; the NASB folded in 1972.

In 1969, the NSA held its annual meeting in El Paso, Texas, where thousands of student delegates overwhelmed the city, particularly the Hotel Cortez, with music, drugs, and free love. Bill M. Shamblin, former editor of the University of Alabama's newspaper, The Crimson White, was one of the meeting's lead speakers. The NSA's Executive Vice President, James Hercules Sutton, presented testimony that year against an all-volunteer United States Army to a Congressional panel that included General James M. Gavin and General Omar Bradley, expressing the view that such an Army would be racially imbalanced in enlisted ranks. Jim Graham, Washington, D.C. city councilman, was an NSA Vice President during this time.

In 1971, Margery Tabankin was elected the first woman president of the NSA.

In 1971, a California-based faction of the organization, dissatisfied with what they perceived as the NSA's limited emphasis on real legislative efforts, split off to form the National Student Lobby (NSL).

That same year, the NSA sponsored an international conference for students from more than 30 countries. At that point, the NSA represented students from more than 500 U.S. colleges and universities. The conference, which took place at Georgetown University, was attended by representatives from more than 40 U.S. colleges/universities. It was the NSA's first participation in an international student conference since the 1967 revelations about the group's prior funding by the CIA.

Actions such as NSA president Tabankin's 1972 visit to North Vietnam led to the NSA being placed on President Nixon's "enemies list," causing further divisions among members.

For its 1973 annual convention, NSA produced a series of booklets given to all attendees, including The Student Press, Women on Campus, and Men on Campus.

In 1974, the NSA established a separate foundation for non-political activities. This strategic move facilitated greater involvement in lobbying efforts and fostered collaboration with the National Student Lobby.

== Renaming as United States Student Association ==
In August 1978, a joint meeting between the NSA and the NSL resulted in a resounding approval for a merger due to overlapping lobbying work and student government-based membership, leading to the formation of the United States Student Association (USSA). Leadership positions were filled from both the NSA and the NSL, and new guidelines were implemented to ensure the diversity of campus delegations. The merger saw the NSL absorbed by the NSA, and the NSA renamed as the USSA, no new entity was created.

By the mid-1980s, the USSA met annually in Washington, D.C., with several hundred students attending.

In the early 1990s, the USSA advocated on behalf of students being eligible for credit cards and beginning to build credit. It also advocated against rising college tuition costs.

In 2017, the USSA failed to elect new leadership. "Years of membership decline, restructuring of grantmaking portfolios in large private foundations, and toxic infighting" led to its operational collapse; tax returns continued to be filed in subsequent years. In 2025, the Internal Revenue Service's tax exempt organization website listed three different organizations (EIN 23-7211922, 52-1178290, 52-0823351) named United States Student Association.

== See also ==
- Congress for Cultural Freedom
- Operation Mockingbird
