= Zurcher v. Stanford Daily =

- Supreme Court of the United States

Argued January 17, 1978 Decided May 31, 1978
- Full case name: Zurcher, Chief of Police of Palo Alto v. Stanford Daily
- Docket no.: 76-1484
- Citations: 436 U.S. 547 (more) 98 S. Ct. 1970; 56 L. Ed. 2d 525; 1978 U.S. LEXIS 98
- Argument: Oral argument

Case history
- Prior: Stanford Daily v. Zurcher, 366 F. Supp. 18 (N.D. Cal. 1973); supplemented, 64 F.R.D. 680 (N.D. Cal. 1974); affirmed, 550 F.2d 464 (9th Cir. 1977); cert. granted, 434 U.S. 816 (1977).

Holding
- The Fourth Amendment does not prevent a state from issuing a warrant against a third party not suspected of committing a crime. Preconditions for the issuance of a search warrants must be applied with "particular exactitude" if the materials being searched are protected by the First Amendment.

Court membership
- Chief Justice Warren E. Burger Associate Justices William J. Brennan Jr. · Potter Stewart; Byron White · Thurgood Marshall; Harry Blackmun · Lewis F. Powell Jr. William Rehnquist · John P. Stevens

Case opinions
- Majority: White, joined by Burger, Blackmun, Powell, Rehnquist
- Concurrence: Powell
- Dissent: Stewart, joined by Marshall
- Dissent: Stevens
- Brennan took no part in the consideration or decision of the case.

Laws applied
- U.S. Const. Amend. IV U.S. Const. Amend. I

Zurcher v. Stanford Daily, 436 U.S. 547 (1978), is a United States Supreme Court case from 1978 in which The Stanford Daily, a student newspaper at Stanford University, was searched by police who had suspected the paper to be in possession of photographs of a demonstration that took place at the university's hospital in April 1971. The Stanford Daily filed a suit claiming that under the protection of the First and Fourth Amendments of the Constitution, the warrants were unconstitutional and that the searches should have fallen under the context of subpoenas. The Supreme Court ruled against The Stanford Daily; however, Congress later passed the Privacy Protection Act of 1980, which provides additional protections against searches and seizures to the press and individuals who disseminate information to the public, unless the individual is suspected of a crime or a life-threatening situation is present.

== Background ==
On April 9, 1971, 13 police officers were injured by a group of demonstrators when the police entered Stanford University Hospital to end a 30-hour sit-in led by the Black United Front, which was protesting the firing of a black janitor at the hospital. A Stanford Daily staff photographer had been positioned in the part of the hospital where the police officers were injured and snapped photographs. Following the violent encounter, the Santa Clara district attorney's office secured a warrant for the search of The Stanford Daily's offices for the photographs. Following these events, The Stanford Daily brought a civil action against the police officers and chief of police who conducted the search of their offices, the district attorney and the judge who had issued the search warrant. The Stanford Daily brought the case under 42 U.S.C. § 1983.

The United States District Court for the Northern District of California granted declaratory relief to The Stanford Daily and held that a warrant for the search of a third party not suspected of criminal activity (a "nonsuspect third party") is forbidden by the Fourth and Fourteenth Amendments unless there is probable cause to find a subpoena duces tecum to be impracticable. The court did not believe that requiring police to obtain information from third parties using the subpoena process, rather than the warrant process, would be detrimental to criminal investigations because innocent third parties in possession of evidence are not incentivized to tamper with or hide evidence. Therefore, the District Court did not believe that a warrant was necessary to preserve the effectiveness of criminal investigations when they are issued to obtain evidence from nonsuspect third parties.

The United States Court of Appeals for the Ninth Circuit affirmed and adopted the District Court's ruling.

== Legal issues ==
=== Fourth Amendment ===
The main question posed in this case was how the Fourth Amendment should be applied to searches of third parties, in which "state authorities have probable cause to believe that fruits, instrumentalities, or other evidence of crime is located on identified property but do not have probable cause to believe that the owner or possessor of that property is himself implicated in the crime" that is being investigated.

=== First Amendment ===
A First Amendment question was also at issue in the case. The Stanford Daily asserted that its First Amendment rights were violated by the search and seizure of photographs from its offices. The newspaper argued that the issuance of warrants for the search of press facilities chills speech because searches physically disrupt newspaper publication operations. The paper also argued that such searches would cause confidential information sources to fear providing information to the press given the possibility that their confidentiality could be destroyed by an unannounced search conducted by state authorities. Therefore, the court also answered the question of whether and how search warrants can be applied to the press and in situations in which the materials being seized might be protected by the First Amendment.

== Decision and opinion ==
Justice White delivered the court's 5–3 opinion in favor of Zurcher. The court held that a state is not prohibited from issuing a warrant to search and seize evidence from a third party that is not a criminal suspect. Additionally, the court held that conditions for a search warrant "must be applied with particular exactitude" when First Amendment considerations are applicable.

The court reasoned that the critical element in determining whether a search of an owner's property is reasonable under the Fourth Amendment is not whether the owner is criminally liable, but rather, whether there is reason to believe that evidence is located on the owner's property. The opinion stated that the Fourth Amendment balances citizens' right to privacy and the public interest in effective criminal investigations, and that it is not the court's place to dictate this balance.

The court also disagreed with the District Court's assessment of the effectiveness of a subpoena duces tecum in searches of nonsuspect third parties. Even if a third party is "seemingly blameless," they may still be found criminally liable later in the investigation or might know the criminal and thus have reason to tamper with and destroy evidence. Further, the court mentioned the possibility that an innocent third party in possession of critical criminal evidence might accidentally discard or destroy evidence in the long period of time that it takes for a subpoena to be processed. For these reasons, the quicker warrant process preserves and protects critical criminal evidence in a way that subpoenas cannot. The majority also disagreed with the argument that privacy interests are minimized with this decision because warrants are more restrictive and require a judiciary to rule on the reasonableness of the warrant. On the other hand, subpoenas do not require judicial scrutiny or proof of probable cause.

Finally, in response to the First Amendment arguments raised by The Stanford Daily, the majority cited Stanford v. Texas, 379 U.S. 476 (1965), which held that when evidence is seized that may be protected by the First Amendment, warrant requirements should be assessed with "scrupulous exactitude." The majority was also careful to note that while "scrupulous exactitude" is required in these instances, there is no constitutional basis for forbidding warrants when the First Amendment is implicated altogether.

=== Concurrence ===
Justice Powell wrote a concurrent opinion solely to take issue with Justice Stewart's dissenting opinion. Justice Powell stated that the framers of the Constitution did not create special Fourth Amendment protections for the press and that there was no constitutional authority to exempt the press from search warrants.

=== Dissenting opinions ===
The dissenting opinion authored by Justices Stewart and Marshall focused on the burden that the court's ruling imposed on freedom of the press and conveyed the belief that a subpoena would be just as effective as a warrant in criminal investigations requiring information from nonsuspect third parties. The justices expressed concern that "the possibility of disclosure of information received from confidential sources, or the identity of the sources [caused by an unannounced police search of a newspaper office]" would chill speech and diminish the flow of useful information to the public. They did not believe that this concern was addressed adequately by the majority opinion.

In his dissent, Justice Stevens expressed concern about the implications of subjecting "countless law-abiding citizens—doctors, lawyers, merchants, customers, bystanders—[who] may have documents in their possession that relate to an ongoing criminal investigation" to unannounced searches and seizures. Similar to Justices Stewart and Marshall, Justice Stevens also expressed his belief that a subpoena would have been effective in this situation. He wrote that "the only conceivable justification for an unannounced search of an innocent citizen is the fear that, if notice were given, he would conceal or destroy the object of the search."

== Implications ==
Congress reacted to the Supreme Court's opinion in Zurcher v. Stanford Daily by passing the Privacy Protection Act of 1980. Following the court's decision in this case, President Carter asked the Justice Department and Congress to consider the viability of a legislative solution to address the issues raised in the case. Just under a month after the Supreme Court had issued its opinion, the Senate Judiciary Committee's Subcommittee on the Constitution commenced hearings to discuss the implications of the court's decision.

In a message to Congress on April 2, 1979, Carter wrote about the dangers to the "effective functioning of our free press" raised by the Zurcher v. Stanford Daily decision. He also wrote that the issues raised in the case "require new, stringent safeguards against Federal, state and local governmental intrusion into First Amendment activities."

The final legislation, the Privacy Protection Act of 1980, supplemented the Fourth Amendment and enhanced privacy protections but was limited in its applicability to individuals engaged in disseminating information to the public, as opposed to being made applicable to the broader group of nonsuspect third parties. Nevertheless, questions still remain as to how broadly a "person in connection with a purpose to disseminate to the public" should be construed, especially in today's digital world in which people have open access to a public digital platform to disseminate information.

Litigation for issues similar to those raised in Zurcher v. Stanford Daily have been decided in the wake of the enactment of the Privacy Protection Act of 1980. A few notable decisions interpreting the act include:

- Citicasters v. McCaskill, 89 F.3d 1350 (8th Cir. 1996): Interpreted the warrant procedure requirements under the act.
- Guest v. Leis, 255 F.3d 325 (6th Cir. 2001): Interpreted the class of individuals and parties to be protected by the act.
- Steve Jackson Games, Inc. v. U.S. Secret Serv. 816 F. Supp. 432, 440 (W.D. Tex. 1993), aff'd, 36 F.3d 457 (5th Cir. 1994): Interpreted the types of materials protected by the act.

While litigation in this area is significantly impacted by the passage of the Privacy Protection Act of 1980, Zurcher v. Stanford Daily has still been cited in court opinions since the passage of the act. For example, in Wyoming v. Houghton, the Supreme Court cited Zurcher v. Stanford Daily to define the elements for a reasonable search. In 2017, the Sixth Circuit cited Zurcher v. Stanford Daily in United States v. Talley, repeating that the "critical element in a reasonable search is ... that there is reasonable cause to believe that the specific 'things' to be searched for and seized are located on the property to which entry is sought."

== See also ==
- List of United States Supreme Court cases involving the First Amendment
- Corry v. Stanford
