= Corry v. Stanford University =

Corry v. Stanford U.
- Court: Santa Clara County Superior Court
- Full case name: Robert J. Corry, et al. v. The Leland Stanford Junior University, et al.
- Decided: February 27, 1995
- Citation: No. 1-94-CV-740309 (Cal. Super. Ct. Santa Clara Cnty. Feb. 27, 1995)

Court membership
- Judge sitting: Peter G. Stone

Laws applied
- U.S. Const. amend. I, Cal. Educ. Code § 94367

Robert J. Corry, et al. v. The Leland Stanford Junior University, et al., No. 740309 (Cal. Super. Ct. Feb. 27, 1995), was a case in which the Santa Clara County Superior Court ruled that Stanford University's speech code violated the freedom of speech rights of its students guaranteed under California's Leonard Law.

== Arguments ==
On May 2, 1994, Robert J. Corry and nine other Stanford students filed suit arguing that Stanford's speech code violated California's Leonard Law. The 1992 law had applied the First Amendment to all of California's secular private colleges and universities.

In addition to Stanford University itself, the defendants included Judicial Affairs Officer Sally Cole, President Gerhard Casper, and Board of Trustees President John Freidenrich. The defendants made two arguments in the suit. First, they argued that Stanford's speech code was protected under Chaplinsky v. New Hampshire, as the code only prohibited fighting words. Secondly, they argued that the Leonard Law actually violated Stanford's First Amendment rights, as Stanford is a private entity.

== Ruling ==
On February 27, 1995, Santa Clara County Superior Court Judge Peter G. Stone ruled in favor of the plaintiffs.

Stone ruled that the Stanford speech code restricted more than just fighting words, by including insulting speech. Therefore, using the Leonard Law and Chaplinsky, the code was illegal. He ruled further that even if he accepted the argument that the speech code only restricted fighting words, it was still illegal using the Leonard Law and R. A. V. v. City of St. Paul as the code restricted speech based on content.

Stone also ruled that the Leonard Law was constitutional, essentially because it did not in any way restrict the speech of the university as a corporate entity. The university remained free to express its abhorrence of racial and other forms of prejudice. He ruled that the law expanded, rather than contracted, the range of legally permissible speech by protecting the free speech rights of students without abridging those of the university itself. To be able to express its own opposition to prejudice, he ruled that it was not necessary for the university to have the power to prohibit speech with which it strongly disagreed.

== See also ==
- Zurcher v. Stanford Daily
