= United States Student Association =

National association of students and student associations in the United States

- Predecessor: National Student Association and the National Student Lobby
- Founded: August 1978; 48 years ago
- Type: Student government; Student lobbying organization
- Location: Washington, D.C., U.S.
- Region served: United States
- Website: https://usstudentassociation.org/

The United States Student Association (USSA) is an American national student advocacy association. It serves as the national student government representing postsecondary students in the United States and is recognized by the Global Student Forum.

== History ==
The organization was born in August 1978 during a joint meeting between the National Student Association (NSA), formed in 1947, and the National Student Lobby (NSL), itself originally born of a split in 1971 with the NSA. The membership of both organizations voted overwhelmingly to merge due to overlapping lobbying work and student-government-based membership. The merger saw the NSL absorbed by the NSA, and the NSA renamed as the USSA; no new entity was created.

By the mid-1980s, the USSA met annually in Washington, D.C., with several hundred students attending.

In the early 1990s, the USSA advocated on behalf of students being eligible for credit cards and beginning to build credit. It also advocated against rising college tuition costs.

Following a period of inactivity from the late 2010s to the mid-2020s, the USSA was revived by representatives from US student governments from around the country in 2025, with the USSA organizing a conference that same year.

== See also ==
- Oregon Student Association
- Jobs with Justice
- Student/Farmworker Alliance
