= Leonard Law =

California law passed in 1992

California State Legislature
- Citation: Cal. Educ. Code Sec. 48950; Cal. Educ. Code Sec. 66301; Cal. Educ. Code Sec. 94367
- Territorial extent: State of California
- Signed by: 1992: 2006: California Governor Arnold Schwarzenegger
- Signed: 1992: 30 September 1992; 2006: 28 August 2006
- Commenced: 1992: 2006: 1 January 2007
- Introduced by: 1992: Bill Leonard; 2006: Joe Nation, Leland Yee
- Status: In force

The Leonard Law is a California law passed in 1992 and amended in 2006 that applies the First Amendment of the United States Constitution to private and public colleges, high schools, and universities. The law also applies Article I, Section 2 of the California Constitution to colleges and universities. California is the only state to grant First Amendment protections to students at private postsecondary institutions. Attempts at a federal Leonard Law and for Leonard Laws in other states have not succeeded.

== History ==
Republican State Senator Bill Leonard wrote the law to require private high schools, colleges, and universities to protect their students' rights to freedom of speech "and other communication" that the government is required to protect for all of its citizens. Under the terms of the law, students may file civil lawsuits to seek injunctive and declaratory relief against their institutions; students may also recover any attorney's fees related to the case.

In 2006, California amended the law to include public institutions of higher education, which in California consist of the California Community Colleges System, the California State University system, and the University of California system. State Assembly members Leland Yee and Joe Nation authored the amendment in preemptive response to the Hosty v. Carter decision of the federal Seventh Circuit Court of Appeals. The amendment came into force in 2007.

== Effect ==
Leonard Law states "No [school] shall make or enforce a rule subjecting a student to disciplinary sanctions solely on the basis of conduct that is speech or other communication that, when engaged in outside the campus or facility of a [school], is protected from governmental restriction by the First Amendment to the United States Constitution or Section 2 of Article I of the California Constitution."

The effect of the law is that – at a public or private school – the school's ability to restrict a student's on-campus speech is constrained to the same extent as if a government entity tried to limit the speech off-campus.

The law applies to public and private colleges, and public and private high schools, but does not apply to elementary or middle schools.

Schools are permitted to enforce reasonable restrictions on the time, place, and manner of the student's speech.

== Lawsuits ==
On May 2, 1994, Stanford Law School student Robert J. Corry and eight other Stanford University students filed the first lawsuit under the Leonard Law, claiming that Stanford's speech code violated the law. On February 27, 1995, Santa Clara County Superior Court Judge Peter G. Stone issued the ruling in Corry v. Stanford that struck down the speech code as a violation of the Leonard Law.

== See also ==
- California Education Code 48907
- Student newspaper
- Student rights
- Student activism
- Student Press Law Center
- First Amendment Center
