= Student rights in U.S. higher education =

Student Rights in United States Higher Education include substantive and procedural rights.

== Institutional regulations ==
- Right to protection from arbitrary or capricious decision making

Decision making should not be arbitrary or capricious / random and, thus, interfere with fairness. While this case concerned a private school, Healy v. Larsson (1974) found that what applied to private intuitions applied also to public.

- Right to have institutions follow their own rules

Institutions are required, contractually, to always follow their own rules. Institutional documents may also be considered binding implied-in-fact contracts. Goodman v. President and Trustees of Bowdoin College (2001) ruled that institutional documents are still contractual regardless of whether they have a disclaimer.

Courts have ruled students are protected from deviation from information advertised in bulletins or circulars, regulations, course catalogues, student codes, and handbooks.

- Right to a continuous contract

Mississippi Medical Center v. Hughes (2000) determined that students have an implied right to a continuous contract during a period of continuous enrollment suggesting that students have the right to graduate so long as they fulfill the requirements as they were originally communicated. Degree requirement changes are unacceptable. Bruner v. Petersen (1997) found also that contractual protections do not apply in the event that a student, who has failed to meet requirements, is readmitted into a program. The student may be required to meet additional requirements which support their success. This may also help avoid issues of discrimination.

- Right to notice of degree requirement changes

Brody v. Finch University of Health Sciences Chicago Med. School (1998) determined that students have the right to notice of degree requirement changes.

- Right to fulfillment of verbal promises

Verbal contracts are also binding. The North Carolina Court of Appeals in Long v. University of North Carolina at Wilmington (1995) found, however, that verbal agreements must be made in an official capacity in order to be binding (Bowden, 2007). Dezick v. Umpqua Community College (1979) found a student was compensated because classes offered orally by the dean were not provided.

Healy v. Larsson (1974) found that a student who completed degree requirements prescribed by an academic advisor was entitled to a degree on the basis that this was an implied contract.

== Academic advising ==
- Right to fulfillment of promises and verbal promises by advisors

Verbal contracts are binding. They must be made in an official capacity, however, to be binding. Dezick v. Umpqua Community College (1979) found a student was compensated because classes offered orally by the dean were not provided. Healy v. Larsson (1974) found that a student who completed degree requirements prescribed by an academic advisor was entitled to a degree on the basis that this was an implied contract. An advisor should, thus, be considered an official source of information.

- Right to a continuous contract during a period of continuous enrollment

Mississippi Medical Center v. Hughes (2000) determined that students have an implied right to a continuous contract during a period of continuous enrollment suggesting that students have the right to graduate so long as they fulfill the requirements as they were originally communicated. Degree requirement changes are unacceptable. Bruner v. Petersen (1997) found also that contractual protections do not apply in the event that a student, who has failed to meet requirements, is readmitted into a program. The student may be required to meet additional requirements which support their success. This may also help avoid issues of discrimination.

- Right to notice of degree requirement changes

Brody v. Finch University of Health Sciences Chicago Med. School (1998) determined that students have the right to notice of degree requirement changes (Kaplan & Lee, 2011). If a student, for instance, is absent for a semester and is not continuously enrolled they need to know if degree requirements have changed.

- Right to protection from arbitrary or capricious decision making

Decision making should not be arbitrary or capricious / random and, thus, interfere with fairness. This is a form of discrimination. While this case concerned a private school, Healy v. Larsson (1974) found that what applied to private intuitions applied also to public.

== Recruitment ==
- Right to basic institutional facts and figures before admission

The 2008 Higher Education Opportunity Act (HOEA, 2008) requires that institutions disclose institutional statistics on the Department of Education (DOE) website to allow students to make more informed educational decisions. Information required on the DOE website includes: tuition, fees, net price of attendance, tuition plans, and statistics including sex, ability, ethnic and transfer student ratios as well as ACT/SAT scores, degrees offered, enrolled, and awarded. Institutions are also required to disclose transfer credit policies and articulation agreements.

- Right to protection from ability discrimination in academic recruitment

The 1990 Americans With Disabilities Act (ADA) and Section 504 of the 1973 Rehabilitation Act prohibits ability discrimination in academic recruitment. This includes ability discrimination in recruitment. Individuals designated with a disability by a medical professional, legally recognized with a disability and deemed otherwise qualified are entitled to equal treatment and reasonable accommodations. The Supreme Court defined Otherwise qualified as an individual who can perform the required tasks in spite of rather than except for their disability.

== Admissions ==
- Right to protection from sex discrimination in admissions

Title IX of the 1972 Higher Education Act Amendments protect all sexes from pre-admission inquiries with regard to pregnancy, parental status, family or marital status. It can be seen that this act also protects against such inquiry regarding inter-sexed, transsexual, transgender or androgynous individuals.

- Right to protection from ability discrimination in admissions

The 1990 Americans With Disabilities Act (ADA) and Section 504 of the 1973 Rehabilitation Act. This includes ability discrimination in admissions. Individuals designated with a disability by a medical professional, legally recognized with a disability and deemed otherwise qualified are entitled to equal treatment and reasonable accommodations in both educational and employment related activities. The Supreme Court defined Otherwise qualified as an individual who can perform the required tasks in spite of rather than except for their disability.

- Right to protection from racial discrimination in admissions

Individuals may not be discriminated against on the basis of their color in either undergraduate or graduate school admissions.

- Right to testing in admissions accommodations

Protection from discrimination in admissions entails that students receive accommodations required to prove they are otherwise qualified, protection from unfair testing practices, testing accommodations for speech, manual and hearing disabilities and access to alternative testing offered in accessible facilities. Alternative testing must also be offered as frequently as are standard tests. Where no alternative testing exists, institutions, however, are not responsible for accommodations.

- Right to protection from sex discrimination in admissions testing

Educational tests which are biased in favor of one gender, may not be relied upon as the sole source of information decision making.

- Right to protection from racially segregating testing policies

Students' equality entails that individuals not be treated differently by individuals or systematically by an institution. Thus, testing policies which systematically discriminate, are unlawful according to the constitution. United States v. Fordice (1992) prohibited the use of ACT scores in Mississippi admissions, for instance, because the gap between ACT scores of white and black student was greater than the GPA gap which was not considered at all.

- Right to race conscious affirmative action in admissions to correct for discrimination

When a school has engaged in racial discrimination in the past they are required by law to take race conscious affirmative action to correct it.

- Right to protection from reverse discrimination

White students are protected from racial discrimination at historic minority institutions. Racial equality calls for the equal treatment of all individuals; it does not permit, however, lower admissions test requirements or subjective judgments for racial minorities when there are objective standards in place for all applicants.

- Right to protection from subjective interviews

There may be no segregation in the admissions process including subjective interviews when there are objective standards in place for all applicants.

- Right to protection from differential testing requirements

Students are protected from the use of lower admissions test scores.

- Right to protection from admissions quotas based on demographics

Students are protected from the use of quotas which set aside seats for certain demographics.

- Right to adherence to registration materials

Students are protected from deviation from information advertised in registration materials. This may be a binding implied-in-fact contract. Goodman v. President and Trustees of Bowdoin College (2001) ruled that institutional documents are still contractual regardless if they have a disclaimer.

== Readmissions ==
- Right to equality in readmissions

Institutions must be careful with readmissions after students have failed to complete necessary program requirements. Readmission raises questions as to why individuals were removed from the program in the first place and whether future applicants may be admitted under like conditions. Discrimination may be alleged regarding both the initial removal and also in the case that other students are not readmitted under like circumstances. Kaplan & Lee and Lee (2011) recommend that institutions, if they wish to avoid breach of contract and discrimination accusations, have an explicit readmission policy even if that policy denies readmission. If students take a voluntary leave of absence, institutions must have a valid reason to refuse readmission.

== Classroom rights ==
- Right to adherence to class syllabi

Students are protected from deviation from information advertised in class syllabi. This may be a binding implied-n-fact contract. Goodman v. President and Trustees of Bowdoin College (2001) ruled that institutional documents are still contractual regardless if they have a disclaimer.

- Right to the advertised course content

Students are entitled to receive instruction on advertised course content. Institutions have the right to require coverage of designated course material by teachers and faculty and students are generally protected if they adhere to syllabus guidelines.

- Right to the advertised level of course instruction

Students may expect teaching in conformity with the course level advertised. Andre v. Pace University (1994) awarded damages on the grounds of negligent misrepresentation and breach of contract.

- Right to attention to course objectives

Teachers must give reasonable attention to all stated course subjects.

- Right to the advertised content covered in sufficient depth

Students may have all advertised content covered in sufficient depth.

- Right to uniformity across class sections

Scallet v. Rosenblum (1996) found that "tight control over the curriculum was necessary to ensure uniformity across class sections".

- Right to fair grading in accordance with the course syllabus

Students may be graded fairly and in accordance with criteria set forth by the course syllabuses and may be protected from the addition of new grading criteria. Institutions have the responsibility of preserving quality in grade representations and comparability between classes and prevent grade inflation. Teachers have the right, under the first amendment, to communicate their opinions regarding student grades, but institutions are required to meet students implied contract rights to fair grading practices. Departments may change grades issued by teachers which are not in line with grading policies or are unfair or unreasonable.

- Right to learn

Students have the right to learn. Teachers do not have free rein in the classroom. They must act within departmental requirements which ensure students' right to learn and must be considered effective. Sweezy v. New Hampshire (1957) found that teachers have the right to lecture. They do not have academic freedom under the law. Any academic freedom rules are put in place by the school.

- Right to protection from the misuse of time

Students may expect protection from the misuse of time; teachers may not waste students' time or use the class as a captive audience for views or lessons not related to the course. Riggin v. Bd. of Trustees of Ball St. Univ. found that instructors may not "wast[e] the time of the students who have come there and paid money for a different purpose."

- Right to effective teaching

Students can expect effective teaching even if it requires departmental involvement in teaching and curriculum development. Kozol (2005) observed that the curriculum development may not be beneficial for all students since some students come from disadvantaged backgrounds where not every student has equitable opportunities to succeed in school. If there is departmental involvement in the students' learning then the departments need to acknowledge that students are different when they belong to a minority group. Ogbu (2004) argued that for an effective teaching to take place, departments need to understand students at a group level as well as at an individual level because even students within the same minority groups are different. Given that students have the right to effective teaching, department involvement needs to understand cultural diversity and cultural differences before a curriculum development is considered.

- Right to protection from written or verbal abuse

Teachers have the right to regulated expression but may not use their first amendment privileges punitively or discriminatorily or in a way which prevents students from learning by ridiculing, proselytizing, harassment or use of unfair grading practices.

- Right to protection from ability discrimination in learning

The 1990 Americans With Disabilities Act and Section 504 of the 1973 Rehabilitation Act prohibit disability based discrimination in the classroom. Act This includes ability discrimination in learning and deemed otherwise qualified are entitled to equal treatment and reasonable accommodations in both educational and employment related activities. The Supreme Court defined 'Otherwise Qualified' as an individual who can perform the required tasks in spite of rather than except for their disability.

- Right to ability accommodation in classroom facilities

Disabled students are entitled to equal access to classrooms facilities required to achieve a degree.

- Right to protection from testing policies which racially segregate

Students Equality entails that individuals not be treated differently by individuals or systematically by an institution. Thus, testing policies which systematically discriminate, are unlawful according to the constitution. United States v. Fordice (1992) prohibited the use of ACT scores in Mississippi admissions, for instance, because the gap between ACT scores of white and black student was greater than the GPA gap which was not considered at all.

== Student group rights ==
- Right to equality in the provision of student activities

Institutions have an obligation to provide equal opportunities in athletics, bands and clubs. This includes equal accommodation of interests and abilities for both sexes, provision of equipment and facility scheduling for such activities as games and practices, travel allowance and dorm room facilities. It includes also equal quality facilities including locker rooms, medical services, tutoring services, coaching and publicity. To ensure that sufficient opportunities are made available for women, institutions are responsible for complying with Title IX in one of three ways. They must provide athletic opportunities proportionate to enrollment, prove that they are continually expanding opportunities for the underrepresented sex or accommodate the interests and abilities of the underrepresented sex.

- Right to the disclosure of athletics plans and expenditures

The 2008 Higher Education Opportunity Act also requires the disclosure of athletics information including male and female undergraduate enrollment, number of teams and team statistics including the number of players, team operating expenses, recruitment, coach salaries, aid to teams and athletes and team revenue (HEOA, 2008). This information is required to ensure equality standards are met.

== Residence halls ==
- Right to have visitors in residence hall rooms

Good v. Associated Students Univ. of Washington (1975) found students have the right to have visitors and solicitors in their residence hall rooms.

- Right to sex equality in housing standards

Students are entitled to housing of equal quality and cost and to equal housing policies.

- Right to protection from gender segregation in residence

Until the nineteen nineties gender segregation was permissible so long as institutional rationale for doing so was narrowly defined and justifiable. This precedent was officially reversed, however, after the Supreme Court in United States v. Commonwealth of Virginia (1992) found that a woman mistakenly admitted to a men's military college was entitled to remain enrolled.

- Right to disability accommodation in residence facilities

Students with disabilities are also entitled to equal quality dormitories with living accommodations (Section 504 Rehabilitation Act, 1973; Kaplan & Lee, 2011. All accommodations are currently free to the student even if the student has the financial means to pay for them.

- Right to protection from age discrimination in residence

Students are entitled to equal treatment in housing regardless of age unless there is a narrowly defined goal which requires unequal treatment and policy is neutrally applied. Prostrollo v. University of South Dakota (1974), for instance, found that the institution may require all single freshmen and sophomores to live on campus. They did not discriminate between age groups.

- Right to protection from dorm search and seizure

Piazzola v. Watkins (1971) established that students are not required to waive search and seizure rights as a condition of dormitory residence. Random door sweeps are impermissible.

- Right to clearly defined terms of dorm search and seizure

Institutions may enter rooms in times of emergency, if they have proof of illegal activity or a threat to the educational environment. Both these terms must be clearly stipulated in advance. Otherwise institutions must ask for permission to enter. When dorms rooms are legally searched for narrowly defined reasons or officials are legally permitted to enter student rooms, students are not protected from property damage incurred in the search process or action taken when evidence is in plain sight.

- Right to protection from illegal police search and seizure

Evidence found in student dorm rooms by institutional employees cannot be used in a court of law and institutions cannot allow police to conduct a search and seizure without warrant. Students may not be punished for refusing a warrantless search from institutional authorities or police officers. When students freely allow institutional officials to enter institutions can hold students accountable for evidence in plain sight.

== Privacy ==
- Right to privacy in higher education

Griswold v. Connecticut (1965) found that the third, fourth, and fifteen amendments together constitute an inalienable right to privacy. Students are extended the same privacy rights extended to the community at large.

- Right to privacy of student records

The 1971 Family Rights and Privacy Act and the 2008 Higher Education Opportunity Act protect student information. Students have the right to access their records, dispute record keeping and limited control over the release of documents to third parties.

- Right to approve release of student information

FRPA and the HOEA require students sign a release before their student records will be provided to third parties (e.g.: to parents and employers tec.). This legislation does allow schools, however, to release information without student approval for the purpose of institutional audit, evaluation, or study, student aid consideration, institutional accreditation, compliance with legal subpoenas or juvenile justice system officers or in order to comply with laws requiring identification of sex offenders on campus. Institutions may also disclose information to student guardians if the student is declared a depeneant for tax purposes (FERPA).

- Right to notice of information disclosures

Under FERPA, schools may publish directory information, including the students name, address, phone number, date of birth, place of birth, awards, attendance dates or student ID number, unless students ask the school not to disclose it. The institution must inform students they are entitled to these rights.

- Right to use pseudonyms on public internet forums

Individuals may use pseudonyms online and are not required to identify themselves (Kaplan & Lee, 2011). Drug testing Random National Collegiate Athletic Association (NCAA) urine testing is legal to protect athlete health, fair competition and opportunities to educate about drug abuse in sports. Officials are allowed to watch athletes urinate. This overturned an earlier ruling which prohibited urination watching.

== Information rights ==
- Right to basic institutional facts and figures before admission

The 2008 Higher Education Opportunity Act requires that institutions disclose institutional statistics on the Department of Education (DOE) website to allow students to make more informed educational decisions. Information required on the DOE website includes: tuition, fees, net price of attendance, tuition plans, and statistics including sex, ability, ethnic and transfer student ratios as well as ACT/SAT scores, degrees offered, enrolled, and awarded. Institutions are also required to disclose transfer credit policies and articulation agreements.

- Right to financial aid information disclosures

The 2008 HOEA also requires institutions of higher education provide financial aid information disclosures, which essentially advertise the financial aid program, pre eligibility disclosures pertaining to the individual student, information differentiating federally insured or subsidized and private loans, preferred lender agreements, institutional rational for the establishment of preferred lender agreements and notice that schools are required to process any loan chosen by students.

- Right to information about the full cost of attendance

According to the 2008 HOEA, financial aid information disclosures must include the average financial aid awarded per person, cost of tuition, fees, room, board, books, supplies and transport.

- Right to information about the full cost of loan repayment

According to the 2008 HOEA, financial aid information disclosures must include the amount of aid not requiring repayment, eligible loans, loan terms, net required repayment.

- Right to detailed federal student loan information

Pre-eligibility disclosures must include notice of repayment, lender details, the principle amount, fees, interest rate, interest details, limits of borrowing, cumulative balance, estimated payment, frequency, repayment start date, minimum and maximum payments and details regarding deferment, forgiveness, consolidation and penalties.

- Right to standards terminology in financial aid forms

Institutions are also required to utilize standard financial terminology and standard dissemination of financial aid information, forms, procedures, data security and searchable financial aid databases to ensure that students can easily understand their contractual rights and obligations. Forms must be clear, succinct, easily readable and disability accessible.

- Right to detailed third party federal student loan information

The HOEA (2008) requires third party student loan lenders to disclose information concerning alternative federal loans, fixed and variable rates, limit adjustments, co-borrower requirements, maximum loans, rate, principle amount, interest accrual, total estimated repayment requirement, maximum monthly payment and deferral options.

- Right to financial aid awareness campaigns for underrepresented students in high education

The HOEA (2008) requires institutions of higher education to engage in financial aid eligibility awareness campaigning to make students aware of student aid and the realities of accepting it.

- Right to the disclosure of athletics plans and expenditures

The 2008 Higher Education Opportunity Act requires the disclosure of athletics information including male and female undergraduate enrollment, number of teams and team statistics including the number of players, team operating expenses, recruitment, coach salaries, aid to teams and athletes and team revenue (HEOA, 2008). This information is required to ensure equality standards are met. This ensures that institutions are abiding by Title IX of the 1972 Higher Education Act Amendments which limits sexual discrimination and requires institutions to offer equal sport, club and opportunities.

- There are many other implied information rights. If legislation states that students are entitled to certain information in pre-eligibility loan disclosures, this implies that they are also entitled to have a pre-eligibility loan disclosure.
- Right to information on the justification of policies

Rosenberger v. Rector and Visitors of the University of Virginia (1995) found student fees must be allocated in a viewpoint neutral way. They cannot be based on religious, political or personal views (Henderickson; Good v. Associated Students University of Washington) and they cannot be levied as a punishment. This suggests that students have a right to policy justification so that they know they are viewpoint neutral.

- Right to information regarding course objectives and content

Students may expect protection from the misuse of time; teachers may not waste students' time or use the class as a captive audience for views or lessons not related to the course. Riggin v. Bd. of Trustees of Ball St. Univ. found that instructors may not "wast[e] the time of the students who have come there and paid money for a different purpose." This assumes that students are entitled to know course objectives and content.

- Right to a course syllabus

Students may be graded fairly and in accordance with criteria set forth by the course syllabuses and may be protected from the addition of new grading criteria. Institutions have the responsibility of preserving quality in grade representations and comparability between classes and prevent grade inflation. This assumes that students have the right to a syllabus to ensure fair grading.

== Discipline and dismissal ==
- Right to protection from ability discrimination in discipline and dismissal

The 1990 Americans With Disabilities Act and Section 504 of the 1973 Rehabilitation Act protect students against discrimination based on ability. This includes ability discrimination in discipline and dismissal. Individuals shall be designated with a disability by a medical professional, legally recognized with a disability.

- Right to due process in disciplinary action

Matthews v. Elderidge (1976) found when there is the possibility that one's interests will be deprived through procedural error, the value of additional safe guards and governmental interests, including monetary expenses, should be weighed. Foster v. Board of Trustees of Butler County Community College (1991) found that students are not entitled to due process rights when appealing rejected admissions applications. They are not yet students.

- Right to due process in disciplinary with the potential to lead to a monetary loss

Due process is required when actions have the potential to resulting a property or monetary loss or loss of income or future income etc. This includes degree revocation or dismissal. Students have a property interest in remaining at the institution and have protection form undue removal.

- Right to due process in disciplinary with the potential for a loss of liberty

Students also have a liberty right to protect themselves from defamation of character or a threat to their reputation. Federal district courts have, therefore, found that due process is required in cases involving charges of plagiarism, cheating and falsification of research data.

- Right to a clear notice of charges in the disciplinary process

In disciplinary measures students are entitled to the provision of a definite charge.

- Right to a prompt notice of charges in the disciplinary process

Students are entitled to a prompt notice of charges, e.g., ten days before the hearing.

- Right to a hearing before an expert judge

In cases involving expulsion or dismissal students are entitled to right to "expert" judgment with a judge who is empowered to expel.

- Right to inspect all documents in disciplinary hearings

Students may inspect documents considered by institutional officials in disciplinary hearings.

- Right to be a witness in disciplinary hearings

Students may stand as a witness and tell their story during disciplinary hearings.

- Right to record disciplinary hearings

Students may record disciplinary hearings to ensure they are conducted in a legal fashion.

- Right to unbiased ruling in disciplinary hearings

Students can expect rulings in disciplinary hearings to be based solely on evidence presented at the hearing. Students are also entitled to a hearing before a person or committee not involved in the dispute.

- Right to a written statement of findings in disciplinary hearings

Students may expect to receive a written account of findings from disciplinary hearings showing how decisions are in line with evidence.

- Right to fairness in disciplinary hearings

Board of Curators of the University of Missouri et al. v. Horowitz (1978) found that fairness means that decisions, a) may not be arbitrary or capricious, b) must provide equal treatment with regard to sex, religion or personal appearance etc. and c) must be determined in a careful and deliberate manner.

- Right to hearing before discipline

Hearings must be conducted before suspension or discipline unless there is a proven threat to danger, damage of property or academic disruption.

- Right to action in line with inquiry findings

Texas Lightsey v. King (1983) determined that due process requires that the outcomes of investigation be taken seriously. A student cannot, for instance, be dismissed for cheating after a hearing has found him not guilty.

- Right to investigation and consideration of circumstance

The American Bar Association (ABA) found that the need for a fair and just hearing also precludes the use of zero tolerance policies which ignore the circumstances surrounding an action. An individual who commits a crime because they believe they are in danger may not be held accountable in the same way as an individual who conducts the same crime for self-interest.

- Right to greater due process in criminal matters

Students accused of criminal acts including drug possession, plagiarism, cheating and falsification of research data or fraud, may have greater due process rights.

- Right to cross examine in criminal matters

Students accused of criminal acts may cross-examine witnesses, counsel.

- Right to an open trial in criminal matters

Students accused of criminal acts may have an open trial to ensure that it is conducted fairly, counsel.

- Right to a fair evidentiary standard of proof in criminal matters

In non-criminal hearings in the educational setting, schools may use a lesser standard evidence but where criminal matters are concerned they must have clear and convincing evidence.

- Right to counsel in criminal matters Students accused of criminal acts may have counsel present. This does not mean that the institution must pay for it but that they

may be present.

- Right to a higher appeals process in criminal matters

Students accused of criminal acts should have access to a higher appeals process.

- Right to legal representation during any formal university disciplinary procedure

The Student & Administration Equality Act is proposed legislation in the North Carolina General Assembly (House Bill 843) would allow any student or student organization that is charged with a violation of conduct at a North Carolina state university the right to be represented by an attorney at any stage of the disciplinary process regarding the charge of misconduct.

== Campus police ==
- Right to protection from unwarranted search and seizure

Students are protected from unwarranted search and seizure. The fourth and fourteenth amendments protect from search and seizure without a warrant. They enshrine the individuals right to be “secure in their persons, houses, papers and effects.” Warrants must include person, place and specific items eligible for search and or seizure. Search and seizure rights do not apply to automobiles.

- Right to arrest by official police officers

Individuals are protected from arrest by undeputized campus police and illegal search and seizure if arrest is made.

- Right to protection from entrapment

Students are protected from entrapment by campus police as individuals are protected outside the educational environment.

- Right to protection from dorm search and seizure

Piazzola v. Watkins (1971) established that students are not required to waive search and seizure rights as a condition of dormitory residence. Random dorm sweeps are impermissible.

- Right to clearly defined terms of dorm search and seizure

Institutions may enter rooms in times of emergency, if they have proof of illegal activity or a threat to the educational environment. Both these terms must be clearly stipulated in advance. Otherwise institutions must ask for permission to enter. When dorms rooms are legally searched for narrowly defined reasons or officials are legally permitted to enter student rooms, students are not protected from property damage incurred in the search process or action taken when evidence is in plain sight.

- Right to protection from illegal police search and seizure

Evidence found in student dorm rooms by institutional employees cannot be used in a court of law and institutions cannot allow police to conduct a search and seizure without warrant. Students may not be punished for refusing a warrantless search from institutional authorities or police officers. When students freely allow institutional officials to enter institutions can hold students accountable for evidence in plain sight.

== Safety rights ==
- Right to protection from injury on campus

A number of state courts have also found that institutions have a responsibility to prevent or make efforts to limit injury on campus from dangerous property and criminal conditions so long as injury is both foreseeable and preventable.

- Right to protection from injury in facilities under campus jurisdiction

Knoll v. Board of Regents of the University of Nebraska (1999) found that institutions are responsible for ensuring the safety of facilities which are either under institutional jurisdiction or oversight. Institutions are, thus, responsible for institutionally owned dormitories and fraternities whether on campus or off campus and also for fraternities which may not be owned by the institution but are regulated by the institution. By taking on a regulatory role the institution also takes on this liability. Another state court found, that when students are not lawfully permitted to be on institutional property or in institutional buildings after hours, for instance, the institution is not responsible. Where institutions willfully take responsibility for something like a fraternity or require students to abide by their rules they also take on the liability.

- Right to protection from foreseeable crime on campus

Students should be safe from for seeable crime especially in light of past reports of crime, if loitering or dangerous conditions have been made etc. Institutions are required to take safety precautions including the monitoring of unauthorized personnel in dormitories, taking action against unauthorized personnel when they pose a threat to safety and ensuring adequate security measures are in place.

- Right to protection from injury caused by other students

Students deserve protection from other students over whom the institution has oversight including voluntarily assumed jurisdiction e.g.: clubs, sororities, fraternities, teams. This, for instance, includes protection from foreseeable or preventable fraternity hazing even if fraternities are not located on institutional property. The institution also has a responsibility to inform itself of safety risks existent in institutionally regulated programs (White, 2007). State courts have found that institutions are not responsible, however, for screening ex-convicts before admission, 1987).

== Constitutional rights ==
Students have the right to constitutional freedoms and protections in higher education. Prior to the 1960s institutions of higher education did not have to respect students constitutional rights but could act as a parent in the interest of the student (Nancy Thomas, 1991). In 1960 Shelton v. Tucker found "the vigilant protection of constitutional freedoms is nowhere more vital than in the community of American schools" and in 1961 Dixon v. Alabama found that students were not required to give up, as a condition of admission, their constitutional rights and protections. In 1969, Tinker v. Des Moines ruled that "students do not shed their constitutional rights... at the schoolhouse gate."

== Free speech and association rights ==
- Right to free speech and association rights

Students retain their first amendment rights in institutions of higher education. Papish v. Board of Curators of the Univ. of Missouri (1973) and Joyner v. Whiting (1973) found students may engage in speech that do not interfere with the rights of others or of the operation of the school. Because schools are places of education they may regulate speech by time, manner and place as long as they provide free speech zones for students as long as they are not used to limit expression.

The Morse v. Frederick trial was a First Amendment student free speech case argued before the Supreme Court of the United States on March 19, 2007. The case involves Joseph Frederick, a then 18-year-old high school senior in Juneau, Alaska, 24 at the time of the decision, who was suspended for 10 days after displaying a "Bong Hits 4 Jesus" banner across the street from his high school during the Winter Olympics Torch Relay in 2002.

- Right to free religious and unaccepted speech

The first amendment protects religious, indecent speech and profane hand gestures including the middle finger. Texas v. Johnson (1989) found that “[i]f there is a bedrock principle underlying the first amendment, it is that the government may not prohibit the expression of an idea simply because society finds the idea itself offensive or disagreeable. The first amendment does not recognize exceptions for bigotry, racism, and religious intolerance or ideas or matters some may deem trivial, vulgar or profane.”

- Right to expression through clothing

Clothing, armbands, newspaper editorials and demonstrations have all been found legal forms of free speech.

- Right to free speech on public forums

The first amendment covers internet communications. On forums designated by the institution as public forums or commonly used as public forums, students may express themselves without content regulation or removal. Online Policy Group v. Diebold, Inc., 2004 Regulation may take place to prevent illegal activities.

== Equality rights ==
- Right to protection from sex discrimination in higher education

Students are protected from discrimination based on sex in any program or activity receiving federal funding except military, fraternity, sorority organizations.

- Right to the protection from sexual harassment in education

Sexual harassment is considered a form of sex discrimination under Title IV of the 1964 Civil Rights Act and applies to all federal programs and activities. Sexual harassment has been prohibited in educational settings and applies also to both opposite and same sex harassment by students.

- Right to sex equality in the provision of student activities

Institutions have an obligation to provide equal opportunities in athletics, bands and clubs. This includes equal accommodation of interests and abilities for both sexes, provision of equipment and facility scheduling for such activities as games and practices, travel allowance and dorm room facilities. It includes also equal quality facilities including locker rooms, medical services, tutoring services, coaching and publicity. To ensure that sufficient opportunities are made available for women, institutions are responsible for complying with Title IX in one of three ways. They must provide athletic opportunities proportionate to enrollment, prove that they are continually expanding opportunities for the underrepresented sex or accommodate the interests and abilities of the underrepresented sex.

- Right to the disclosure of athletics plans and expenditures

The 2008 Higher Education Opportunity Act also requires the disclosure of athletics information including male and female undergraduate enrollment, number of teams and team statistics including the number of players, team operating expenses, recruitment, coach salaries, aid to teams and athletes and team revenue. This information is required to ensure equality standards are met.

- Right to protection from ability discrimination in facilities

The 1990 Americans With Disabilities Act and Section 504 of the 1973 Rehabilitation Act prohibits ability discrimination in higher education. This includes ability discrimination in facility use. Individuals designated with a disability by a medical professional, legally recognized with a disability and deemed otherwise qualified are entitled to equal treatment and reasonable accommodations in both educational and employment related activities. The Supreme Court defined Otherwise qualified as an individual who can perform the required tasks in spite of rather than except for their disability.

- Right to protection from race discrimination

The 1972 Equal Educational Opportunity Act protects students equal rights to educational opportunity regardless of race and the 1965 Lyndon B. Johnson Executive Order 11246 and the 1964 Civil Rights Act require equal access to employment opportunities regardless of race.

- Right to protection from racial segregation

Students are protected from racial segregation which compromises access to quality education.

- Right to affirmative action

All federal employers or federal contractors are required to take affirmative action to help counteract the effects of historical discrimination. They must create goals, timetables, action plans, budgets and reporting systems to ensure that marginalized populations are given equal employment opportunities. Regulations must also be posted in conspicuous places easily available to all staff and potential employees.

- Right to freedom from discrimination in affirmative action

Diversity is defined in much broader terms than race. Grutter v. Bollinger (2003) found a “broad range of qualities and experiences that may be considered valuable contributions” and “a wide variety of characteristics besides race and ethnicity.” Members of the majority are also protected from reverse discrimination. Race neutral affirmative action policies must make exceptions on an individual basis and may not discriminate based on race or color.

- Right to protection from discrimination based on national origin in education

Individuals have the right to equal treatment regardless of national origin in institutions of higher education (HEA, 1965) so long as they are citizens or resident aliens of the United States. The 1986 Immigration and Reform Control Act also prohibits discrimination based on citizenship. Institutions have the right to discriminate based on national origin so long as objectives are both narrowly defined and neutrally applied. It is, thus, permissible to require non-resident aliens who are legally present in the United States to have health insurance for instance.

- Right to protection from age discrimination

Age discrimination in federally funded programs is prohibited by the 1975 Age Discrimination Act. This act builds on the 1967 Age Discrimination in Employment Act. It provides protection from unequal treatment between people of different ages from any explicit or implied distinctions which effect the benefits of participation.

- Right to equal treatment of student groups

Gay Activists Alliance v. Board of Regents of University of Oklahoma (1981) found student groups are entitled to equal and unbiased recognition. Recognition includes the unbiased allocation of facility and equipment resources except when there is proof that a student group does not maintain reasonable housekeeping or poses a threat of danger, disruption or criminal action.

== Autonomy rights to free choice (26th amendment) ==
- Right to personal autonomy

Healey v. James (1972) found students have the right to self-determination. “Students—who, by reason of the 26th Amendment, become eligible to vote when 18 years of age—are adults who are members of the college or university community. Their interests and concerns are often quite different from those of the faculty. They often have values, views, and ideologies that are at war with the ones which the college has traditionally espoused or indoctrinated. Bradshaw v. Rawlings (1979) found that "adult students now demand and receive expanded rights of privacy in their college life".

== Contract rights ==
Carr v. St. Johns University (1962) and Healey v. Larsson (1971, 1974) established that students and institutions of higher education formed a contractual relationship. Institutions of higher education are responsible to ensure that contracts, including those implied and verbal, are fair, in good faith and not unconscionable.

Students are protected from deviation from information advertised in the following documents: registration materials, manuals, course catalogues, bulletins, circulars, regulations, Ross v. Creighton University class syllabi, student codes, and handbooks. These documents may be binding implied-n-fact contracts. Goodman v. President and Trustees of Bowdoin College (2001) ruled that institutional documents are still contractual regardless if they have a disclaimer. This decision found that "even though the college had reserved the right to change the student handbook unilaterally and without notice, this reservation of rights did not defeat the contractual nature of the student handbook."

Ross v. Creighton University found that verbal contracts are binding. The North Carolina Court of Appeals in Long v. University of North Carolina at Wilmington (1995) found, however, that verbal agreements must be made in an official capacity in order to be binding. Dezick v. Umpqua Community College (1979) found a student was compensated because classes offered orally by the dean were not provided. Healy v. Larsson (1974) found that a student who completed degree requirements prescribed by an academic advisor was entitled to a degree on the basis that this was an implied contract. An advisor should, thus, be considered an official source of information.

== Consumer rights ==
John F. Kennedy's 1962 Consumer Bill of Rights, which is not a legal document, asserts that consumers have the right to consumer safety, information preventing fraud, deceit and informed choice, to choose from multiple alternative options and the right to complaint, to be heard and addressed. A number of these principles are enshrined in the law of higher education.

- Right to limited fiduciary care (institutional care in the student's best interest)

Johnson v. Schmitz (2000) found in a federal district court that a PhD committee established for the sole purpose of advising the student had an obligation to advise the student in his best interest. This is a limited fiduciary right.

- Right to care regarding the safety of students

Bradshaw v. Rawlings (1979) reiterated that where a special relationship is established, courts may impose a duty upon an institution or individual to ensure the care of others. Duty is defined here “as an obligation to which the law will give recognition in order to require one person to conform to a particular standard of conduct with respect to another person.” Institutions have a duty of care to ensure the safety of students while respecting their personal autonomy. Mullins v. Pine Manor found that "[t]he fact that a college need not police the morals of its resident students... does not entitle it to abandon any effort to ensure their physical safety”.

- Right to a grievance filing process

Dixon v. Alabama (1961) determined that when students' constitutional rights are not upheld, students are eligible to sue for damages in a court of law for monetary or material damages. Individuals may also file complaints regarding discrimination with the federal Office of Civil Rights (OCR).

- Right to protection from injury on campus

A number of state courts have also found that institutions have a responsibility to prevent or make efforts to limit injury on campus from dangerous property and criminal conditions so long as injury is both foreseeable and preventable.

- Right to protection from injury in facilities under campus jurisdiction

Knoll v. Board of Regents of the University of Nebraska (1999) found that institutions are responsible for ensuring the safety of facilities which are either under institutional jurisdiction or oversight. Institutions are, thus, responsible for institutionally owned dormitories and fraternities whether on campus or off campus and also for fraternities which may not be owned by the institution but are regulated by the institution. By taking on a regulatory role the institution also takes on this liability. Another state court found, that when students are not lawfully permitted to be on institutional property or in institutional buildings after hours, for instance, the institution is not responsible.

- Right to protection from foreseeable crime on campus

Students should be safe from for seeable crime especially in light of past reports of crime, loitering or dangerous conditions. Institutions are required to take safety precautions including the monitoring of unauthorized personnel in dormitories, taking action against unauthorized personnel when they pose a threat to safety and ensuring adequate security measures are in place.

- Right to protection from injury caused by other students

Students deserve protection from other students over whom the institution has oversight including voluntarily assumed jurisdiction e.g.: clubs, sororities, fraternities, teams. This, for instance, includes protection from foreseeable or preventable fraternity hazing even if fraternities are not located on institutional property. The institution also has a responsibility to inform itself of safety risks existent in institutionally regulated programs. State courts have found that institutions are not responsible, however, for screening exconvicts before admission.

== Employment rights ==
- Right to protection from sex discrimination in the workplace

Students are protected from discrimination based on sex in any program or activity receiving federal funding except military, fraternity, sorority organizations. There are protections for both public and private employment. All employment opportunities must be merit based.

- Right to equal pay for sexes in the workplace

All sexes have the right to equal pay for equal work performed in the workplace in institutions of higher education. This would include student employment. This may suggest that transgender people are also entitled to equal pay in the workplace.

- Right to protection from forced pregnancy leave

Women do not have to go on mandatory pregnancy leave before birth, and the right to doctor prescribed leave during pregnancy.

- Right to the protection from sexual harassment in the workplace

Sexual harassment is prohibited in both educational and workplace settings and applies also to both opposite and same sex harassment by employees.

- Right to active protection from sexual harassment in the workplace

The 1997 Department of Education and Office of Civil Rights Sexual Harassment Guidelines find also that institutions are liable for incidence wherein the institution was aware or "should have been aware" of sexual harassment and took no immediate action. The majority of federal court cases involving educational institutions prohibit the maintenance of conditions which allow harassment by other students to continue.

- Right to protection from ability discrimination in the workplace

Ability discrimination in federally funded and private programs and activities is prohibited under the 1990 Americans With Disabilities Act (ADA) and Section 504 of the 1973 Rehabilitation Act. Individuals designated with a disability by a medical professional, legally recognized with a disability and deemed otherwise qualified are entitled to equal treatment and reasonable accommodations. The Supreme Court defined Otherwise qualified as an individual who can perform the required tasks in spite of rather than except for their disability.

- Right to protection from ability discrimination in employment recruitment

The 1990 Americans With Disabilities Act and Section 504 of the 1973 Rehabilitation Act. This includes ability discrimination in recruitment. Individuals designated with a disability by a medical professional, legally recognized with a disability.

- Right to protection from ability discrimination in workplace discipline and dismissal

The 1990 Americans With Disabilities Act and Section 504 of the 1973 Rehabilitation Act in discipline and dismissal.

- Right to protection from age discrimination

Age discrimination in federally funded programs is prohibited by the 1975 Age Discrimination Act. This act builds on the 1967 Age Discrimination in Employment Act. It provides protection from unequal treatment between people of different ages from any explicit or implied distinctions which effect the benefits of participation.

- Right to protection from race discrimination in employment

Executive Order 11246 expanded upon the 1953 Dwight D. Eisenhower Executive Order 10479, which established an anti-discrimination committee to oversee governmental contracting. The 1967 Lyndon B. Johnson Executive Order 11375 also requires all facets of federal employment or federally contracted employment be regulated based on merit – this includes institutions of higher education.

- Right to protection from discrimination based on national origin in employment

Individuals have the right to equal treatment regardless of national origin in employment settings so long as they are citizens or resident aliens of the United States. The 1986 Immigration and Reform Control Act also prohibits discrimination based on citizenship.

== State level rights ==
In addition to the United States Constitution granting Freedom of Expression Rights to public school students, some state constitutions afford greater rights to public school students than those granted by the United States Constitution. For example, Massachusetts General Laws Chapter 71, sec. 82 grants broader rights to public secondary schools regarding Rights of Students to Freedom of Expression.

In Massachusetts, for instance, k-12 students are entitled to freedom of expression through speech, symbols, writing, publishing and peaceful assembly on school grounds. The Public secondary school legislation entitled "right of students to freedom of expression; limitations; definitions" says students have: "The right of students to freedom of expression in the public schools of the commonwealth shall not be abridged, provided that such right shall not cause any disruption or disorder within the school. Freedom of expression shall include without limitation, the rights and responsibilities of students, collectively and individually, (a) to express their views through speech and symbols, (b) to write, publish and disseminate their views, (c) to assemble peaceably on school property for the purpose of expressing their opinions. Any assembly planned by students during regularly scheduled school hours shall be held only at a time and place approved in advance by the school principal or his designee." The result is students in the public secondary schools in Massachusetts are only held to the “Tinker” standard regarding Freedom of Expression.
