= Student rights =

Collective rights, freedoms, and protections of students

Student rights encompass:

- Student rights in primary education
- Student rights in secondary education
- Student rights in higher education

These are sometimes collected and formalized in a student bill of rights.

== See also ==
- Free education
- Right to education
- Student activism
- Student council
- Student voice
- Student wing
- Students' union
- Universal access to education
- Voluntary student unionism
