= University council =

Governing body in a university

A university council may be an executive body or a non-executive governing body of a university's governance system, an advisory body to the university president, or something in between in authority.

In the United Kingdom and many other countries, the council is responsible for all financial matters, the buildings and the appointment of the vice-chancellor. Academic affairs are the business of the university senate. In some cases the senate and council have equal status under the legislation that established the university. In other cases, such as Australia, the senate is technically responsible to the council, although the council is normally reluctant to enter into a discussion on academic issues. The membership of university councils consists of people from outside the university, often appointed by governments, along with some staff and, in some cases, students. The council is chaired by the university chancellor or a pro-chancellor or deputy chancellor.

== Brazil ==
In most Brazilian public universities, the University Council is the highest deliberative body, with broad academic, administrative, and financial powers. The Brazilian Constitution establishes that "universities enjoy didactic-scientific, administrative, and financial and patrimonial management autonomy," and the University Council is responsible for exercising this autonomy under the presidency of the Rector and assisted by other bodies.

== United Kingdom ==
In most pre-1992 universities in the United Kingdom, council is the governing body. (In post-1992 universities this is the board of governors; in the ancient universities of Scotland this is the court.) According to the Higher Education Code of Governance, the council's primary responsibilities include appointing the executive head of the institution (normally titled the vice-chancellor), delegating powers of management to them, and monitoring their performance, with a "clear separation of roles and responsibilities" between the council and the executive. The council is also the principal financial and business authority and the legal authority of the university, and the members of council are the trustees of the university. The council is therefore sometimes called the board of trustees (e.g., at the University of Bristol).

Council will normally have an independent chair and (except at Oxford and Cambridge) a majority of "lay" members, not employed by or students of the university. There is also "an expectation" in the code of governance that council will contain representatives of staff and students (often the president of the students' union) in addition to the lay members and the university's senior management. At some universities there are external ex officio members or members nominated by an outside body, reflecting their institutional history (e.g., the Dean of Durham at Durham University or two members nominated by the Worshipful Company of Drapers at Queen Mary University of London),

In the ancient universities of Scotland, the general council is the consultative assembly of the graduates and academic staff, created by the Scottish Universities Act 1858. These are completely different from the governing-body councils of other British universities, being equivalent to the convocations of the universities of Oxford and Durham and the senate of the University of Cambridge.

== United States ==
In the United States, the university council takes the form of a board of regents or trustees.

== See also ==
- University Council of the University of São Paulo
- University of Oxford Council
