= Anastasios Nerantzis =

Greek attorney and politician (1944–2021)

- Αναστάσιος Νεράντζης

Secretary General of the Interparliamentary Assembly on Orthodoxy
- In office 2010–2021

3rd Deputy Speaker of the Hellenic Parliament
- In office 2007–2009

Secretary General of the Hellenic Parliament
- In office 1978–1981

Personal details
- Born: 3 October 1944 Nikaia, Attica, Greece
- Died: 11 July 2021 (aged 76)
- Party: New Democracy
- Education: National and Kapodistrian University of Athens
- Website: www.nerantzis.gr

Anastasios (Tasos) Nerantzis (Greek: Αναστάσιος (Τάσος) Νεράντζης; 3 October 1944 – 11 July 2021) was a Greek attorney and politician.

A co-founder of the New Democracy party, he was a long-standing member of the Hellenic Parliament, governor of Samos and Lesbos prefectures, and held various posts as deputy minister in the first Karamanlis government (2004–07). Having dropped out of the Hellenic Parliament in 2014, he remained Secretary-General of the Interparliamentary Assembly on Orthodoxy.

== Biography ==
Born and raised in Nikaia near Piraeus, Nerantzis was the Greek junior champion of 1958 in table tennis and a leading member of the Greek scout movement. In 1961, he got involved with right-wing National Radical Union's youth organisation EREN. Studying law at Athens University, he was elected chairman of the Student Union of Nikaia and Korydallos.

Following the 1974 collapse of the Greek military junta Nerantzis became a founding member of New Democracy and with the first election was rightaway elected a member of the Hellenic Parliament representing the suburban Piraeus B constituency. From 1978 until 1981, he would serve as the parliament's Secretary-General, and in 1994, he was elected a member of New Democracy's Central and Executive Committees. He didn't return to parliament before November 1989, but would remain a Member of the Hellenic Parliament for seven consecutive terms, from 1993 until 2014.

Under prime minister Kostas Karamanlis, Nerantzis held various vice-ministerial posts. Deputy of Development minister Dimitris Sioufas, he was involved in the Turkey–Greece gas pipeline completed in 2007. In the 2007–09 period, he was the 3rd Deputy Speaker of the Hellenic Parliament representing his party's parliamentary group.

A long-standing delegate of the Hellenic Parliament to the Interparliamentary Assembly on Orthodoxy (I.A.O.), Nerantzis in 2010 was elected Alternate Secretary. In 2012 he was promoted to the post of the transnational organization's Secretary-General. Following a 2010 visit to the Armenian Orthodox, separatist Nagorno-Karabakh region, the government of Azerbaijan declared him a persona non grata.

== Positions and controversy ==
=== Compulsory voting ===
In the 2000–2004 term, Nerantzis was a member of the Committee for the Revision of the Constitution. In the debate on abolishing administrative sanctions to enforce compulsory voting, he was cited to be the only member objecting to the abolition on the grounds that this would render compulsory voting, which he strongly defended, a pure "academicism, a light that does not shine, a fire that gives no heat."

=== Nikoloudis Report ===
When in his last parliamentary term (2012–14), Nerantzis was elected president of the parliament's Special Permanent Committee on Institutions and Transparency, he was involved in several controversies. After he had been criticized for procedural irregularities in late 2013, in early 2014 he was accused by the opposition for withholding the "Nikoloudis Report" from the parliament. The report named after Cassation Court investigator Panagiotis Nikoloudis listed 413 persons indicted for tax evasion and money laundering, including a number of local and regional government officials. While Nerantzis first argued that the list didn't specify names and that no members of the Hellenic Parliament were affected, Syriza MP Zoi Konstantopoulou's public attacks finally forced him to reveal the list.

=== Homophobia controversy ===
In a parliamentary debate in September 2014, Nerantzis railed against the adoption of an anti-discrimination bill aimed at protective rights for same-sex couples. "Since the third century marriage has been defined only between man and woman. As such, there is no place for civil unions in Greece." he said, comparing homosexuality with paedophilia and brothels "allowing bestiality".
