= Students' union =

Type of student organization

A students' union or student union, (Note: also known by many other names including students' council, student government, free student union, student senate, students' association, guild of students, or government of student body) is a student organization present in many colleges, universities, and high schools. In higher education, the students' union is often accorded its own building on the campus, dedicated to social, organizational activities, representation, and academic support of the membership. It may also be a club.

Students' unions emerged in Europe during the nineteenth century. In the United States, student union often only refers to a physical building owned by the university with the purpose of providing services for students without a governing body. This building is also referred to as a student activity center, although the Association of College Unions International (largely US-based) has hundreds of campus organizational members. Outside the US, student union and students' union more often refer to a representative body, as distinct from a student activity centre building, and may also refer to a building run by that representative body.

== History ==
The first student unions were social societies at the universities of Cambridge and Oxford in England, which were established in the early 19th century. The union provided a place where students could express themselves and debate the issues of the day. Representative student organizations emerged in Europe beginning in the 1860s. They enabled student debate and began to represent the interests of their members. University celebrations, congresses, and an international federation enabled exchange on the European level. The first students' union in Britain was the Student Representative Council formed at the University of Edinburgh in 1884.

Harvard University formed a debating society in 1832. Around the turn of the 20th century, the idea of students' unions emerged at campuses across the eastern United States. The first student union building was Houston Hall built in 1896 at the University of Pennsylvania, which at that time was “part clubhouse and part country estate.”

== Purpose ==
Depending on the country, the purpose, assembly, method, and implementation of the group might vary. Universally, the purpose of students' union or student government is to represent fellow students in some fashion.

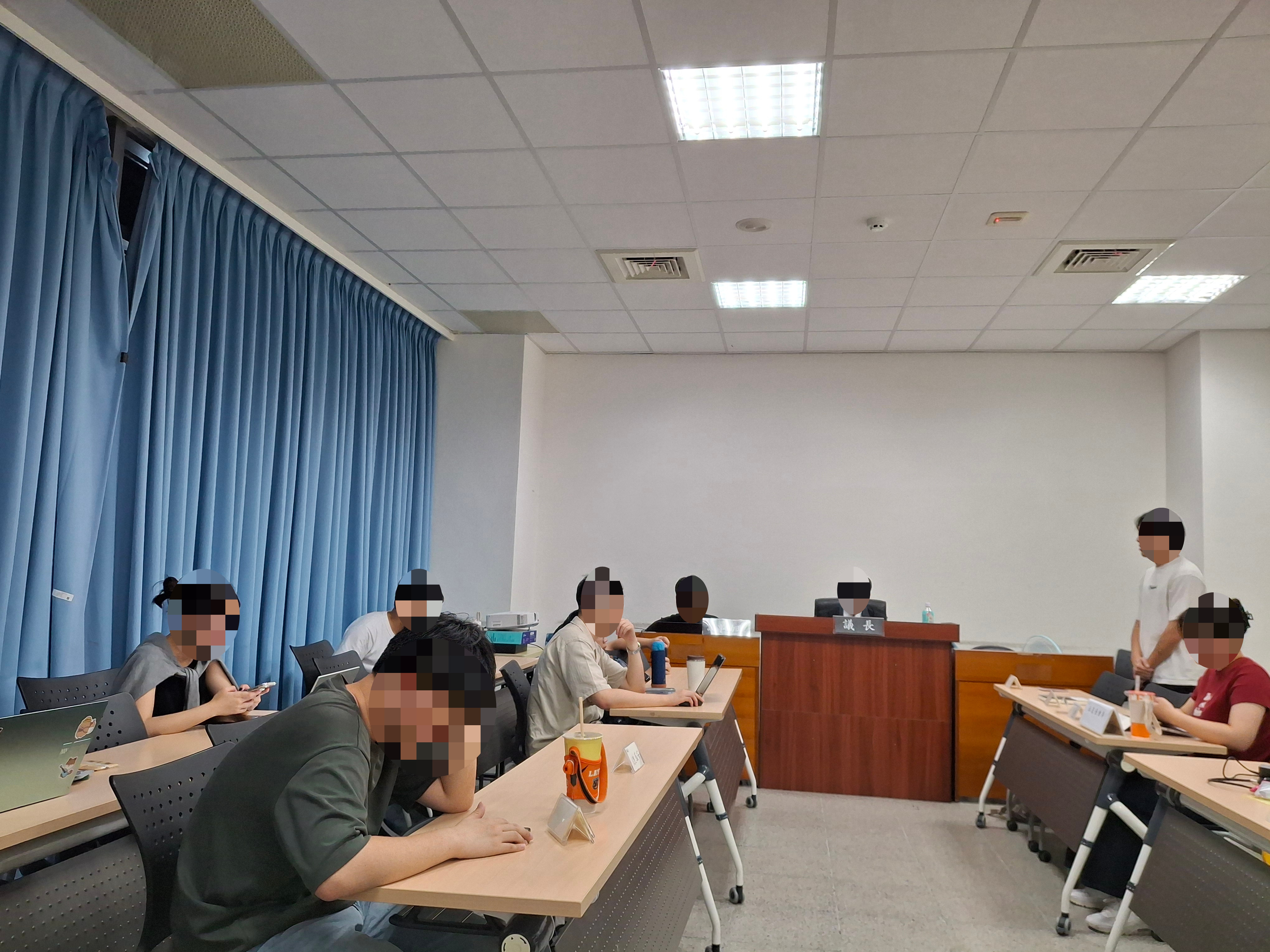
The president of the Sanxia Campus Student Union of National Taipei University in Taiwan is standing up to answer questions at a meeting of its Student Congress.

In some cases, students' unions are run by students, independent of the educational facility. The purpose of these organizations is to represent students both within the institution and externally, including on local and national issues. Students' unions are also responsible for providing a variety of services to students. Depending on the organization's makeup, students can get involved in the union by becoming active in a committee, by attending councils and general meetings, volunteering within a group, service or club run by the union, or by becoming an elected officer.

Some students' unions are politicized bodies, and often serve as a training ground for aspiring politicians. Students' unions generally have similar aims irrespective of the extent of politicization, usually focusing on providing students with facilities, support, and services.

Some students' unions often officially recognize and allocate an annual budget to other organizations on campus. In some institutions, postgraduate students are within the general students' unions, whereas in others they have their own postgraduate representative body. In some cases, graduate students lack formal representation in student government.

The student government president (sometimes called a student body president, student council president, or simply a school president) is generally the highest-ranking officer of a student union. Students performing in this role typically serve a ceremonial and managerial purpose, as a spokesperson of the entire student body. Duties usually include working with students to resolve problems and informing school administration of ideas emanating from the student body. In this role, they may make student appointments, campus-wide committees and boards, and may represent the institution to other associations or bodies. For example, the student government presidents within the University System of Georgia also serve on the statewide Student Advisory Council of Georgia.

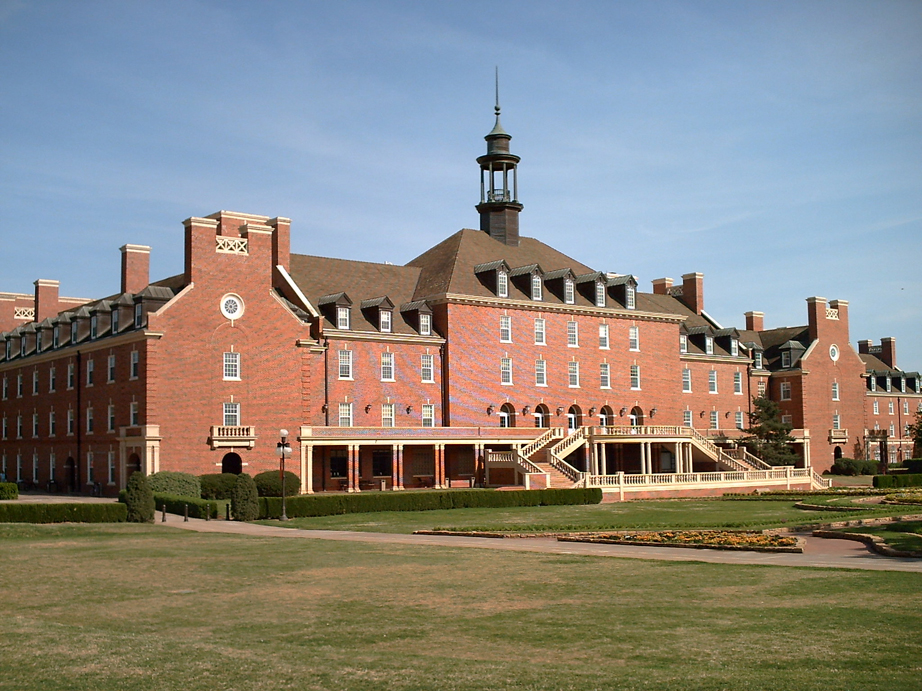
A students' union building at Oklahoma State University, which doubles as a student activity center.

== Variations depending on country ==
Depending on the country, the purpose of students' union or student government varies.

=== Asia and Oceania ===
==== Australia ====
In Australia, all universities have one or more student organizations. Australian student unions typically provide such services as eateries, small retail outlets, student media (e.g., campus newspapers), advocacy, and support for a variety of social, arts, political, recreational, special interest and sporting clubs and societies. Most also operate specialized support services for female, LGBT, international and indigenous students. Many expressed concerns over the introduction of voluntary student unionism (VSU) in 2006. Prior to the Higher Education Support Amendment (Abolition of Compulsory Up-front Student Union Fees) Bill 2005 students were generally required to become a member of their campus student organisation.

In 2011, the Government passed legislation to allow universities to charge students a compulsory service fee to fund amenities such as sporting facilities, childcare and counselling, as well as student media and "advocating students' interests".

The National Union of Students of Australia represents post school students at a national level; the Council of Australian Postgraduate Associations is the umbrella organisation for postgraduate students' unions.

==== Azerbaijan ====
Azerbaijan Students Union (ASU) was established by students from Baku on 15 September 2008. ASU is an organization which was established on basis of international experience and it was the first student organization which united students irrespective of gender, race, creed, nationality.

During its action period ASU has formed stable structure, presented new suggestions about student policy to appropriate bodies, made close relations with international and regional student organizations, prepared new action plan according to the universities-students-companies' relations in Azerbaijan.

ASU's delegates were participants of the First Asia IAESTE Forum in Shanghai during 12–15 November 2009. Azerbaijan Students Union has been a full member of European Students' Union until 2015.

==== China ====
In China, the student body is usually referred to as 学生会 (pinyin: xuéshēng hùi; lit. 'student union') or 学生联合会 (pinyin: xuéshēng liánhé hùi; lit. 'student league').

Membership in different universities has different functions. Some universities may give the membership a task of recording the students' attendance and the complex grades. Student associations of Chinese universities are mostly under the leadership of Communist Youth League of China, which to a large extent limit its function as an organization purely belonging to students themselves.

==== Hong Kong ====
All universities in Hong Kong had students' unions until the Hong Kong national security law came into effect in 2020, when the many students' unions were forced to disband under political pressure. Most of these students' unions were members of the Hong Kong Federation of Students.

==== India ====
India has developed a complex tradition of student politics dating from the era of Indian National Congress movement domination. Student unions are organised both within universities, like the Student Council of IISc and across universities.

All India Students Federation (AISF) is the oldest student organisation in India founded on August 12, 1936. AISF is the only students organisation in the country which was actively involved in the Indian freedom struggle, but affiliated with political parties, as in the case of Akhil Bharatiya Vidyarthi Parishad, Muslim Students Federation, Students Federation of India, National Students Union of India etc. who compete in elections to control posts in universities and colleges.

Examples of activist unions include the Jawaharlal Nehru University Students' Union, Delhi University Students Union, Jadavpur University's Faculty of Engineering and Technology Students' Union (FETSU). Recently few school administrations had also started including the student government system as co-curricular activities in one form or another.

==== Indonesia ====
In Indonesia, every university, college and higher education school has a student union. The student union in universities is commonly called the Student Executive Board (Indonesian: Badan Eksekutif Mahasiswa, abbreviated as BEM), though the official name could be vary between universities or faculties. Most of BEMs are affiliated with several national unions, such as All-Indonesian BEM (BEM SI) or BEM Nusantara (BEMNUS).

==== Japan ====
In Japan, the student body is called 学生自治会 (gakusei-jichi-kai). In Japanese, the word 学生自治会 (gakusei-jichi-kai) means students' self-government-organizations. The student body in Japan promotes extracurricular activities. Usually, a cultural association, 文化会 (bunka-kai), and a sports association, 体育会 (taiiku-kai), are included within a student body as autonomous organizations. A student belongs to one or more students' organizations, and does extracurricular activities through these students' organizations. However, the extracurricular activities of universities and colleges have been declining since the 1990s.

There is no nationwide student union in Japan that participates in university administration or university management.

==== Malaysia ====
Malaysia has 20 public universities. Each of them has one students' representative council (Malay: Majlis Perwakilan Pelajar, MPP), the highest student body of such university as stipulated in the Universities and University Colleges Act 1971 (AUKU).

The registered students of the University, other than external students, shall together constitute a body to be known as the Students' Union of the University, and the Union shall elect a Students' Representative Council. (Article 48 Section 1-2, Universities and University Colleges Act)

A general election is held every year, usually in November (With the exception of University of Malaya in July), to elect representatives to MPP. The percentage of voter turn-outs are usually high (70 to 95 percent) largely due to enforcements from the universities' management which, at the same time, acts as the Election Committee. Amendments on the Universities and University Colleges Act 1971 in 2019 allows students to be fully in-charge of the Election Committee.

Every year, the Malaysian Ministry of Higher Education would set meetings and arrange programmes with all MPPs. Nevertheless, each MPP has their own autonomous right to govern their own membership. The size of MPP differs from each university, from as little as 12 to as many as 50, which may include non-associate members from student leaders representing their respective student body. All MPP members are part-time and unpaid officers.

In 2011, Universiti Sains Malaysia established Students' Consultative Assembly (Malay: Dewan Perundingan Pelajar, DPP), the first student parliament established and the oldest of its kind in Malaysia, to involve participation of more student leaders in decision and policy making as well as to establish a legislative branch in its Students' Union system instead of having the only executive branch. A university student parliament is composed of MPP members and other elected or appointed student leaders representing their respective student body, along with the presence of the management's and students' representative as observers. In 2020, Universiti Utara Malaysia revived the Students' Parliament (Malay: Parlimen Mahasiswa) as the legislative branch in its Students' Union system which was left dormant since its last meeting at 2013 and the next meeting since its revival was held in April 2021. As at May 2021, 8 public universities in Malaysia had their student parliament established.

However, there were several disputes regarding the autonomy of the MPP, since executive decisions were depending upon the advice of the Students' Affairs Department (Malay: Jabatan Hal Ehwal Pelajar), especially among several students' rights activists, who insists that the Universities and University Colleges Act 1971 (AUKU) to be abolished and replaced with a new act to 'revive' students' autonomy on administration as in the 1960s'.

==== Myanmar ====
The role of students' unions in Myanmar were attached with Politics. From 1920, the students' union were outcoming and tried to get the Interdependence of Nation. There were many students boycotts in Myanmar: 1920, 1936, 1962, 1974–75–76, 1988, 1996, 2007 and recently 2015 March. Most of them were connected with political issues.

==== New Zealand ====
Students associations have a strong history in New Zealand of involvement in political causes, notably the Halt All Racist Tours campaign during the 1981 Springbok Tour. All universities, and most polytechnics and colleges of education have a students association. Before 1998, membership of Students' Associations (pep) was compulsory at all public Tertiary Education providers (universities, polytechnics and colleges of education). In 1997 the Voluntary Student Membership amendment to the Education act allowed tertiary students themselves choose whether their provider should be voluntary or compulsory on the basis of a referendum at every public Tertiary Education Provider. An amendment to the bill making all student associations voluntary passed on 28 September 2011.

Most of New Zealand Tertiary students' associations are confederated under the New Zealand Union of Students' Associations.

==== Philippines ====
Student unions in the Philippines are referred to as student government and/or student council (Filipino: Konseho ng mga Mag-aaral). They are vital organizations for student representation and advancing the struggle of the people for their democratic rights and freedoms. At the primary and secondary level, student unions are referred to as pupil government handled by the Department of Education under their Student Government Program. Meanwhile, at the tertiary level, private and state colleges and universities have their own student councils. As universities may further be subdivided into colleges with their own specializations (e.g., College of Law, College of Medicine, College of Arts and Sciences, etc.), the highest student representation will usually be referred to as the university student council while the student representation of these colleges will be called college student council(s).

Student councils, especially those in universities, have a history of activism in the local and national level due to various socio-political and economic issues, with the First Quarter Storm and the Diliman Commune being two of many examples.

Aside from student unions, students are further represented in overall decision-making of their respective university's governing body through the student regent (e.g., UP Office of the Student Regent for the students of the University of the Philippines System). The student regent is a consequence of tireless and continuous struggle of the students to be represented in the highest policy-making body of their respective universities such as the school board where the student regent has voting powers, among others. Student regents are very common for universities with campuses in different locations and most especially in state universities and colleges.

On the other hand, these student unions are also connected throughout the country through various alliances or networks such as the National Union of Students of the Philippines (NUSP), which serves as a nationwide alliance of student councils/governments/unions committed to the advancement of the students' democratic rights and welfare since its establishment in 1957.

==== Sri Lanka ====
In Sri Lanka, each state university has several Students' unions with formal links to respective faculties. Inter University Students' Federation is the umbrella organization of 14 unions of university students. However, most of these have political affiliations and function as proxies of these political factions. Many unions take an active political role within the university and in the country as a whole. This frequently lead to much clashes between rival students' unions or the authorities.

==== Taiwan ====
In Taiwan, the student body is called 學生會 (pinyin: Xuéshēng Hùi; lit. 'student union or student association') or 學生自治會 (pinyin: Xuéshēng Zìzhì Hùi; lit. 'students' self-government-organizations'), these groups are often known as student association and students' union, or less commonly a student government. The law requires all universities and high schools should have a Student Association. Many universities student association in Taiwan are members of the National Students' Union of Taiwan (Chinese: 臺灣學生聯合會).

=== Africa ===
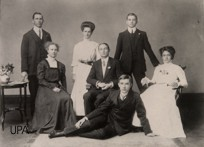
The University of Pretoria's first student council in 1909

In South Africa student representative councils are the executive and plenary body of student governance and charters and provides most of the funding for other student groups, and represents students' interests when dealing with the administration. In several instances representatives of these bodies are members of the university's Senate.

In 2012 the first student union in Libya, after 42 years of suppression, was founded. Students from Al Mimona Ebem Alharth school public school in Tripoli-Libya successfully established the union and promoted for other schools around the country to do the same. The founder Alaa Amed received local media attention for this achievement.

While higher education and student activism might vary depending on the country the National Association of Nigerian Students' is an organization with well over 50 university union across the nation.

Tunisia has many students unions including the Union Générale des Étudiants de Tunisie founded in 1952, and Union Générale Tunisienne des Étudiants founded in 1985.

=== Europe ===
While each country for the most part has its own national students' union, the European Students' Union is an umbrella organization of 45 national unions of students from 36 European countries.

==== Armenia ====
The Armenian National Students Association was established in September 2003 and represents 90 thousand students across Armenia. It is a member of the European Students' Union. The National Youth Council of Armenia was established in 1997 and represents 70 student and youth structures throughout Armenia.

==== Denmark ====
In Denmark the higher education system comprises two parallel sectors: universities and university colleges of applied sciences (e.g. nursing and engineering schools or teachers' colleges). Universities are characterised by scientific research and the highest education based thereon. University colleges of applied sciences are oriented towards working life and base their operations on the high vocational skill requirements set by it. These vocational institutions offer 3–4 year 'professional bachelor's degrees'. Besides that there are a number of art schools. Universities belong under the Ministry of Science, University Colleges belong under the Ministry of Education, and the Art Schools belong under the Ministry of Culture. There are 12 universities at the moment, but in 2006 there is a major merger process going on to make fewer, bigger institutions. The student unions at universities (and some of the art schools' student unions) are generally members of the National Union of Students in Denmark which represents these students on the national level.

Every university has a student union (In Danish, Studenterråd). Membership is not mandatory. The student unions are funded by the university and the Ministry of Science on the basis of the percentage of votes received every year at the university election. The student union is autonomous, its internal life organized by its by-laws. The student unions are responsible for all representation of the students and elect the student members of different administrative organs. They usually coordinate and finance the activities of smaller, more specialized student organizations. For the financing of their activities, some student unions exact a membership fee and/or engage in different businesses.

In the Ministry of Culture institutions there are also local student organisations. In the Ministry of Education institutions, The student activities are very much related to a student division of the Labor Union in the different areas. For instance, the teachers' students are organised in the national labor union for teachers and so forth.

The Upper-Secondary schools (In Danish, Gymnasier), It is in Denmark a law that there has to be a student council at the Upper-Secondary schools. The student councils are organized in the following organisations:

==== France ====
The central organization of the French higher education system means that local university bodies have restricted decision-making power. As a consequence, student unions are generally established at national level with local sections in most universities. The largest national student unions have a strong political identity and their actions are generally restricted to the defense of their vision of higher education rather than being focused on the particular interests of the membership of a single university. Union membership is regarded as an essentially political decision, without any particular advantage for students. The strength of unions is often measured by their effectiveness in national protests rather than by membership figures. The National Union of Students of France (UNEF) is the oldest French student union created in 1907. It laid the modern foundations of student unionism in France in 1946 when it adopted the Charter of Grenoble.

There are also class-struggle student unions such as the Solidaires Étudiant-e-s (formed in January 2013 through the fusion of the former organizations SUD Étudiant and Féderation syndicale étudiante (FSE)) which refuse to cooperate with the universities' direction and work to organize students. There are also radical-right student organizations like the Student Cockade.

In the grandes écoles, the premium league in the French higher education system, students are generally members of the official Student Office (Bureau des étudiants or Bureau des élèves) in charge of the organization of social activities and sports events. The constitutions of these societies, which work in close partnership with the school administration, usually prevent union members from running for executive positions in order to keep the school independent from political groups liable to harm the school's prestige.

===== High school students' union =====
The first high school organizations appear sporadically with social movements since the mid-1960s.

Modern French high school unionism appeared after the Devaquet Law Project which had sparked a mass mobilization of high school and university students in November and December 1986 : In 1987 the Independent and Democratic High School Students' Federation was founded. This organization was the first to claim syndicalism. It is the oldest French high school students union still in operation.

Others high school students unions referring to syndicalism will follow: in 1994, the national high school students' union was created after the social movement against the professional integration contract bill. In 2009, the General High School Students' Union and then in 2016, the National High School Student Movement, were born out of a split with the national high school student union.

==== Germany ====
In Germany the actual form of student representation depends strongly on the federal state. In most states there is a General Students' Committee (AStA) at every university. It is the executive organ of the parliaments and councils of all faculties.

==== Greece ====
In Greece every university department has its corresponding student union (in Greek: Σύλλογος Φοιτητών) and all students belonging to the department have the right to register as members. The main objective of a student union is to solve students' problems that can either be related to academic life or have a general political and social nature. Furthermore, student unions organize and support numerous activities such as political debates, demonstrations, university occupations, educational lectures, cultural and artistic events, conferences and so on.

The structure of a student union is rather simple and comprises two bodies: The General Students' Assembly (Greece) and the board of directors. The general assembly consists of all student-members of the union. It takes place on a regular basis and is the only decision-making body. During the general assembly, many topics of student interest are discussed and the decisions are taken after open vote. The board of directors makes sure that the decisions of the general assembly will be materialized. Moreover, the members of the board of directors, among which is the union's president, participate in various university administrative bodies as representatives of all students in the union.

Every year in early spring the student elections take place nationwide, during which students vote for their representatives. All student unions in Greece are members of the "National Student Union of Greece" (ΕΦΕΕ – Εθνική Φοιτητική Ένωση Ελλάδας).

==== Ireland ====
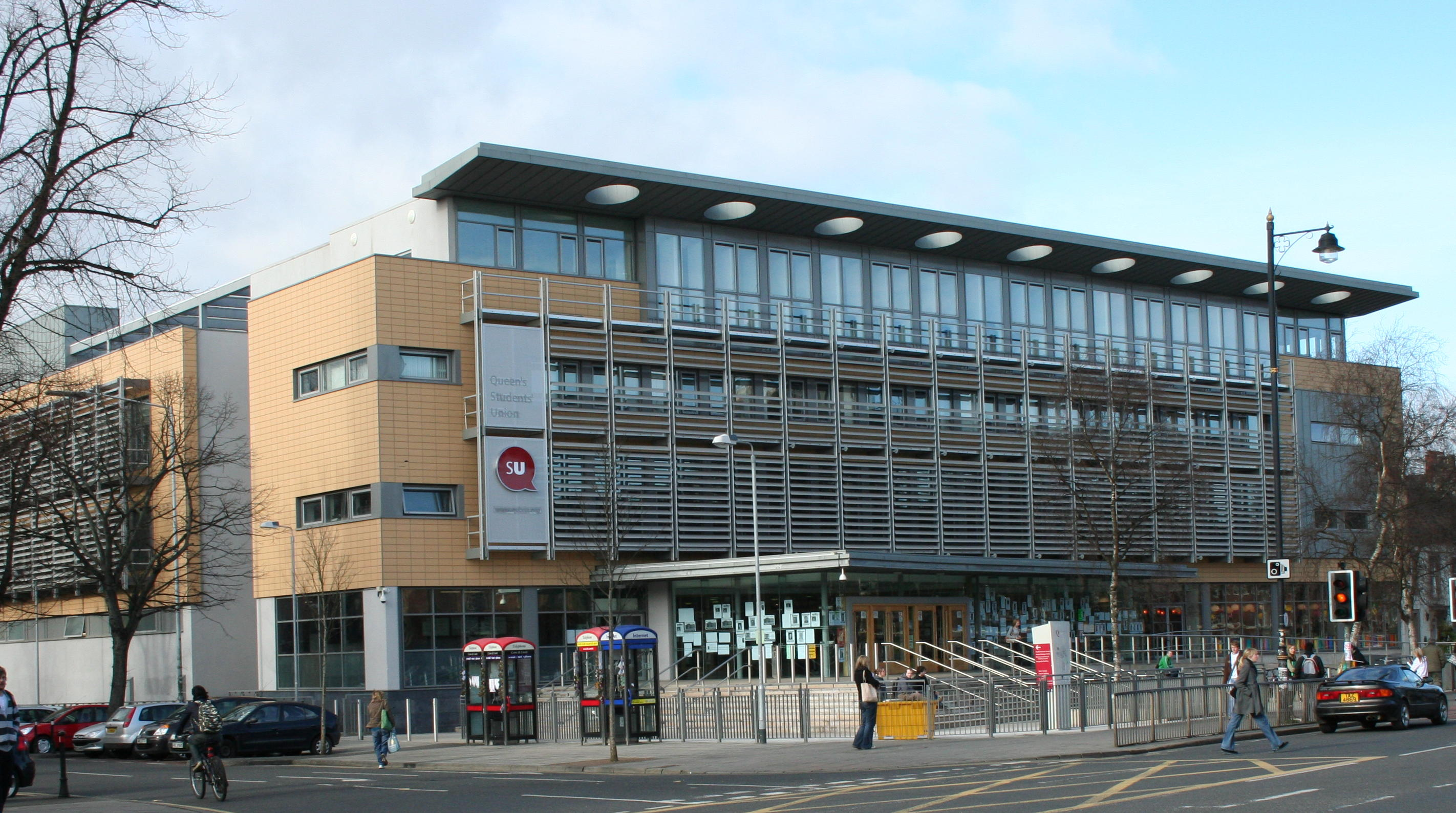
Former building of the Queen's University Belfast Students' Union

Most of Ireland's universities and colleges have students' unions which were established to represent the students in the context of internal college issues and on wider student related issues and also a means of solidarity with other movements globally. An ongoing campaign of virtually every students' union in Ireland is to prevent the reintroduction of tuition fees which were abolished in 1995. Most students' unions are affiliated with the national student union, Aontas na Mac Léinn in Éirinn (AMLÉ), with University of Limerick Student Life being a notable exception. The students' unions are operated in accordance with the rules set down in their constitution which invariable enumerates a strong democratic and inclusive procedure for the governance on the union. Some students' unions run retail businesses in the interests of its students and run referendums, such as on whether or not to support same-sex marriage or abortion.

National Union of Students-Union of Students in Ireland (NUS-USI), the student movement in Northern Ireland was formed in 1972 by bilateral agreement between the UK National Union of Students (NUS) and the Union of Students in Ireland (USI), to address the particular problems of representing students in Northern Ireland.

==== Netherlands ====
There are several students' unions in The Netherlands which act as labor unions for students. The largest ones are VSSD in Delft and ASVA Studentenunie in Amsterdam. These students' unions are all members of LSVb, the national students' union. There's also a similar organization called ISO (Interstedelijk Studenten Overleg), which consists of several formal participation organizations, as well as ASVA Studentenunie and VSSD. Both ISO and LSVb are members of European Students' Union.

Lastly, the Netherlands has an (unofficial) student union for its students that study abroad: Netherlands Worldwide Students or simply NEWS.

The Netherlands is also home to an unusual case of student representation in which a local political party completely run by student gained seats during local town hall elections, STIP.

==== Norway ====
In Norway, every university is instructed and required by law to have a student union elected by the students at the university. Additionally, Norwegian law requires two students to be appointed as members of the board of directors for all universities. The goal for every student union is to act as the official voice of the students towards the university's administration and rector, informing them on the students' perspectives on most issues at the institution, either academic or administrative. They often additionally seek to improve their school environment through encouraging social, cultural and other extracurricular events in the local community. Each student union in Norway is governed by a board of directors that is elected directly from the Student Council. In addition, most upper secondary schools in Norway are affiliated with the School Student Union of Norway.

==== Portugal ====
In Portugal, every university, polytechnic institute and any other higher education schools has their own students' unions. Union organizations are generally aimed to organize and promote extracurricular activities such as sports and culture events, parties, and academic festivities. At the same time, they also act as "labour unions for students" promoting and defending the students' points of view and rights, and dealing with the teaching institutions and the State's education agencies policies. The oldest union of Portugal is the Associação Académica de Coimbra (founded in 1887) which belongs to the students of the University of Coimbra. The biggest students' union is Associação Académica da Universidade de Lisboa.

==== Sweden ====
At Swedish universities, students' unions are responsible for representing the students in evaluation of the education and decision-making within the universities. Not Swedish universities are affiliated with the Swedish National Union of Students. The union normally holds about one-third of the votes within every decision-making body and thus holds a great deal of power.

The unions are usually governed by a general assembly of elected representatives. Students' unions generally provide counselling services to its members and publishes their own magazines or newspapers. Large universities often have several students' unions, where the smaller students' unions only provide basic services. Larger students' unions often own and run their own facilities at the university such as shops, restaurants and night clubs.

==== United Kingdom ====
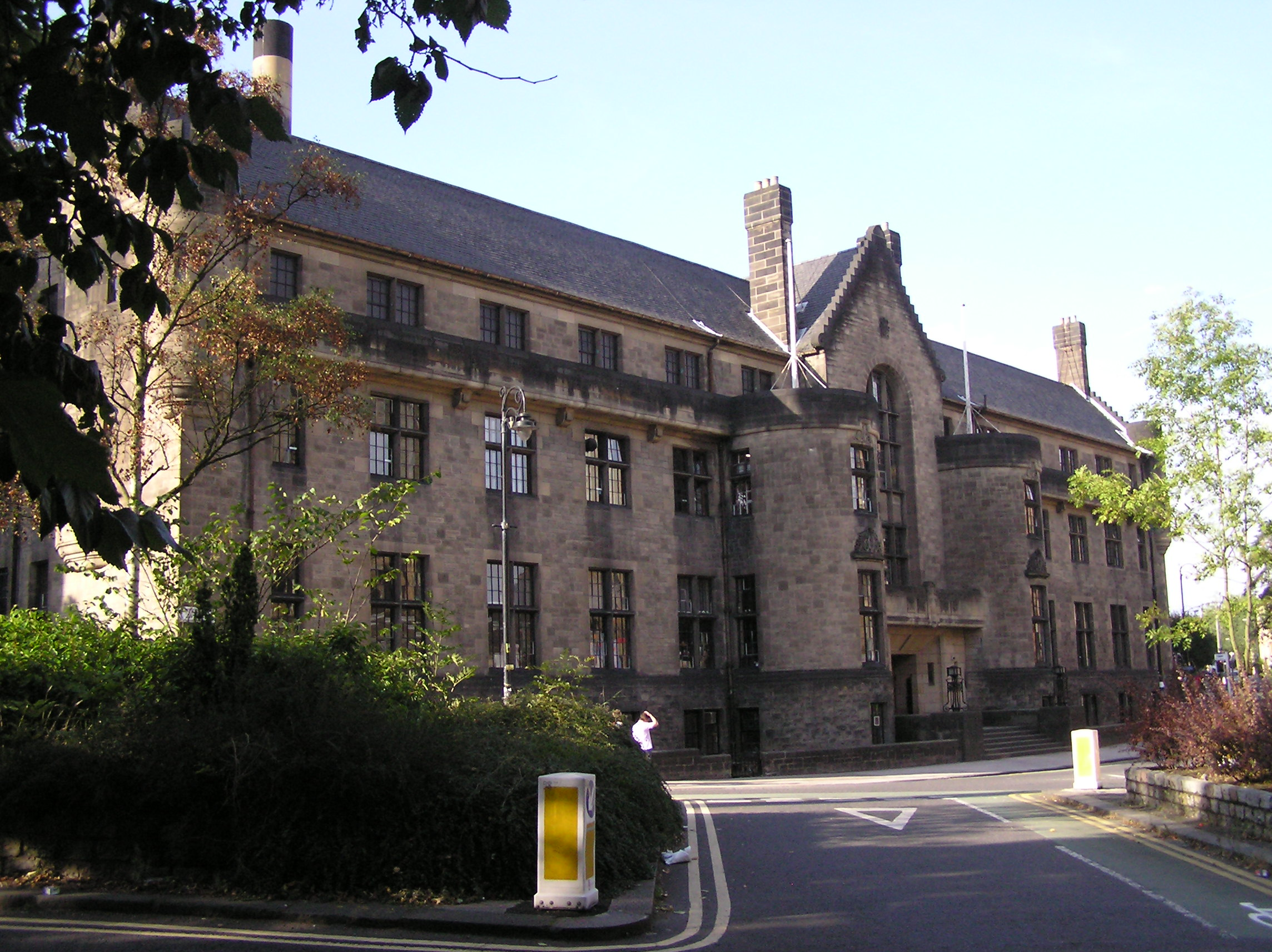
Glasgow University Union was the last students' union in the UK to begin admitting women.

The United Kingdom has a long history of student unionism at a local and national level. The Oxford Union and Cambridge Union date back to the early 19th century. Founded as debating societies, these were not representative bodies. The oldest students' union in Britain was the Student Representative Council formed at the University of Edinburgh in 1884. Most bodies are termed unions, however there exist a number of guilds and students' associations. Students' association is a popular term in Scotland, as historically there were separate men's and women's unions focused on societies and entertainment with representation to the university carried out by separate students' representative councils. Most students' unions in the UK are affiliated to the National Union of Students, although there exist other national representative bodies, such the National Postgraduate Committee, the Coalition of Higher Education Students in Scotland and the Aldwych Group, the association of students' unions of members of the Russell Group.

National Union of Students-Union of Students in Ireland (NUS-USI), the student movement in Northern Ireland was formed in 1972 by bilateral agreement between the UK National Union of Students (NUS) and the Union of Students in Ireland (USI), to address the particular problems of representing students in Northern Ireland.

Under the Education Act 1994, the role and purpose of students' unions is defined as being "promoting the general interests of its members as students". This has limited the ability of students' unions to campaign on issues not directly related to their members as students, such as Apartheid and the 1984–85 miners' strike.

===== Scotland =====
Students' representative councils, also known as students' administrative councils, are most commonly found in Scottish universities. They represent student interests in the government of a university, school or other educational institution. Generally the SRC forms part of a broader students' association, which may include other functions such as societies, entertainments (in the form of a students' union) and sports (in the form of a sports' union). Universities may have a statutory obligation to receive representation from the SRC and it is usual for student representatives from the SRC to form part of university structures including the university court, academic senate, and other bodies.

Students' representative councils in Scotland were established as part of the system of ancient university governance by the Universities (Scotland) Act 1889 in the four extant universities of the time: Aberdeen, Edinburgh, Glasgow and St Andrews. The existence of an SRC was also incorporated in the royal charter of the University of Dundee, which adheres to the ancient governance structure. More recently, SRCs have been established at the University of Strathclyde and at Heriot-Watt University's Scottish Borders Campus.

In general, SRCs have been submerged into wider students' associations, which are an umbrella term for various bodies which not only perform representation tasks, but also cater for student welfare, societies, entertainments (in the form of a Students' Union) and sports (in the form of a sports' union). In acknowledgement of this, Aberdeen University Students' Association has elected to use the name Students' Association Council for its SRC, despite its formal and legal title remaining unchanged. An exception to this system is Glasgow University Students' Representative Council which is not part of a Students' Association as a result of the university's retention of its separate male and female students' unions (in the form of the Glasgow University Union and the Queen Margaret Union respectively), although since 1980 both now admit both men and women as full members whilst retaining their separate identities.

Each university has a statutory obligation to receive representation from the SRC and it is usual for student representatives to be elected by the SRC or student body onto various positions in the main administrative bodies of the institution: the university court, academic senate or general council. The SRC is usually headed by a sabbatical officer elected by the student body, who will usually be paid and take a year out of study to take on the role. Sometimes they will, instead, dedicate a year after completing their studies. In many cases there are a small number of other full-time elected officers. There are also unpaid part-time officers who continue with their studies, and there may be permanent staff members employed to assist in the running of the SRC. The SRC or its students' association may choose to facilitate a vote on membership of the National Union of Students Scotland or the Coalition of Higher Education Students in Scotland, and it is the students' association, rather than the individual students, which may become a member of one of those bodies.

=== The Americas ===
==== Canada ====
In Canada, the existence of a college or university students' union and the membership of those who attend the institutions is mandatory across Canada under various provincial statutes. Included in Canadian students' tuition fees is anywhere from an additional $10–$500 fee to pay for the services of the union for either undergraduate or graduate support. The money raised from dues is used to support, programs, services, advocacy, salaries, part-time staff costs, overhead costs and a variety of other general costs. Student elections typically happen prior to the end of the previous educational year as the membership elect their unions' executives for the following year. The current largest undergraduate student union in Canada is the York Federation of Students, at York University, with around 60,000 members.

Most students' unions are charged by their membership to protect their best interests at the university, municipal, provincial and federal government levels. Advocating for support from the provincial government for areas such as lower tuition fees, support for sexual and gender based violence, and financial support, as well as creating position papers and providing research to support various causes. Many students' unions in Canada are members of one of the national student organizations, the Canadian Alliance of Student Associations (CASA) or the Canadian Federation of Students (CFS). Those that belong to the CFS at the national level also belong to the CFS at the provincial level. Those that do not belong to the CFS may belong to a provincial student organization like the New Brunswick Student Alliance, the Ontario Undergraduate Student Alliance (OUSA), the College Student Alliance, StudentsNS (formerly known as ANSSA), the Alliance of British Columbia Students, the Council of Alberta University Students, or the Alberta Students Executive Council. In Quebec, the provincial student organizations are the Quebec Federation of University Students (Fédération étudiante universitaire du Québec or FEUQ) for university students, college students are represented by the Fédération étudiante collégiale du Québec or FECQ, while the Association pour une solidarité syndicale étudiante or ASSE includes students from both the undergraduate and graduate levels of education.

Different provinces have different rules governing student unions. In British Columbia under section 27.1 of the University Act, student unions may only raise or rescind mandatory student union fees through a democratic referendum of the membership. Once fees are passed through this mechanism, the board of governors of the respective institutions are then required to remit those fees to the student union, and may only interfere in the internal affairs of the student union if it fails to complete annual audits of its finances, giving these student unions strong autonomy over their institutions. In Ontario, the autonomy of student unions is set by standards outlined by each institution, giving university administrators a broader scope of powers over the finances of student unions. Ontario educational institutions may only revoke collecting fees on behalf of the students' union if they are in contravention of the Corporations Act of Ontario. Other provinces have governing acts specific to the institutions, such as The University of Manitoba Students' Union Act.

Students' Unions in Canada typically offer a variety of services such as LGBTQ2+ groups, Women's Centre's, Food Banks, Bicycle Repair Shops, Campus First Aid teams, Walksafe programs, Peer Support groups and Racialized Student Support, among other offerings and independent student groups. Unions also generally offer health and dental plans, termly bus passes at costs negotiated with the local transit authority, and other student assistance programs. Funding options are also a part of many student unions' including endowment funds, funding for student clubs and for orientation. Students' unions are also programmers for the beginning of term events such as Welcome Week, Frost Week and other events throughout the term that provide social connections and wellness for students. Advocacy is also a main portion of what a students' union does including connecting with the university or College to advocate for changes to programs, co-op, and affordability. They also advocate for housing and tenant rights, safety, quality of education, academic rights, transportation concerns, accessibility, diversity and equity and health and wellness.

==== Mexico ====
In Mexico, students unions are mostly predominant in universities. Mexican universities have an elected student committee each year, but the faculties or schools within the universities have also their own union. This practice is also extended to other levels of education, such as high and junior high school, but to a lesser extent. An example of this is the Sociedad de Alumnos de HPA Mexico.

Jesuit student groups played an important role in Mexico's history, particularly in opposing the imposition of socialist education in Mexico in the 1930s. Leaders from the Unión Nacional de Estudiantes Católicos (UNEC) had long-term importance in Mexico's political history, since a number of them helped form the conservative National Action Party (Mexico).

==== United States ====
In the United States, these groups are often known as student government, associated students, student senate, student assembly, or less commonly a students' union. In the U.S., the phrase "student union" often refers to a "student activity center" (also known as a "student center" or "student commons"), a building with dining halls, game rooms, lounges, student offices, and other spaces for student activities. At institutions with large graduate, medical school, and individual "college" populations, there are often student governments that serve those specific constituencies. The national student government in the United States, the United States Student Association (USSA), was revived in 2025 after a period of inactivity since the late 2010s. The USSA is the latest in a succession of national student governments in the United States dating back to the 1920s. The Harvard Union, a debating society, dates back to 1832.

==== Brazil ====
The Brazilian Society

This society has existed since 2003 and now has 190 members, where only one third are Brazilian. The other two thirds are people who are just interested in Brazilian politics, famous parties and culture. This is one of the societies that students may join if they so wish. The society has social events and it hosts lectures. They also have a Brazilian discussion group on a weekly basis in order to discuss current events.

== Global level ==
The earliest attempt at a students' union at the global level was likely the Confédération Internationale des Étudiants that existed from 1919 until 1939 when its Paris headquarters was destroyed by the Nazis. Students' unions from around the world formed the International Union of Students after the Second World War. In the mid-twentieth century, Cold War tensions prompted student unions from the United States and other allied countries to form a competing organization, the International Student Conference. After the Cold War, students' unions of the world appear to have reunited under the banner of the International Union of Students judging from the list of members on its Wikipedia page and from what can be deduced from a 2000 report issued by its leadership. However, a combination of membership, financial, and bureaucratic crises resulted in the International Union of Students collapsing sometime around the 2000s.

By the 2020s, two new attempts at a student government at the global level had emerged, the Global Student Forum led by a group of continental and supra-campus student unions and the Global Student Government that comprised an assortment of student unions and international subject-based student governments. In 2024, the Global Student Forum and the Global Student Government joined forces under the banner of the former.

== See also ==
- Student activism
- Student voice
- Student court
- Governance in higher education
- Student centre
- Voluntary student unionism
- Student bill of rights
- Student council
