= Parliamentary Service Act 1963 =

Parliament of Federation of Malaya
- Long title: An Act to provide for the qualifications for appointment and conditions of service of members of the staff of House of Parliament.
- Citation: Act 394
- Territorial extent: Malaysia
- Passed by: Dewan Ra'ayat
- Passed: 12 March 1963
- Passed by: Dewan Negara
- Passed: 15 March 1963
- Repealed: 20 November 1992

Legislative history

Initiating chamber: Dewan Ra'ayat
- Bill title: Parliamentary Service Bill 1963
- Introduced by: Tunku Abdul Rahman, Prime Minister
- First reading: 11 March 1963
- Second reading: 12 March 1963
- Third reading: 12 March 1963

Revising chamber: Dewan Negara
- Bill title: Parliamentary Service Bill 1963
- Member(s) in charge: Tunku Abdul Rahman, Prime Minister
- First reading: 15 March 1963
- Second reading: 15 March 1963
- Third reading: 15 March 1963

Amended by
- Parliamentary Service (Amendment) Act 1972 [Act A101]

Repealed by
- Constitution (Amendment) Act 1992 [Act A837]
- Status: Repealed

Parliamentary Service Act 1963 (Malay: Akta Perkhidmatan Parlimen 1963, abbreviated PSA) was an act providing for the Parliament of Malaysia to conduct its own administration, staffing and financing. The act was repealed in 1992 after the then Speaker of the Dewan Rakyat (the lower house of Parliament), Zahir Ismail unilaterally had it removed from the books.

However, a majority of Members of Parliament (MPs) called for the act to be revived in October 2005, when the issue of separation of powers was ignited in the Dewan Rakyat by opposition leader Lim Kit Siang of the Democratic Action Party (DAP). Earlier, Minister in the Prime Minister's Department in charge of parliamentary affairs, Nazri Aziz had announced the setting up of the post of Head of Administration for Parliament and (varyingly) a Department or Office of Parliament, to handle affairs such as maintenance and assistance for MPs. One MP from the ruling Barisan Nasional coalition exasperatedly decried the amount of red tape required for MPs to hire research assistants, and another stated he was forced to use online websites such as Wikipedia for his research.

However, the MPs agreed that the post of Head of Administration for Parliament was unnecessary interference in Parliament's financial affairs, and asked for the restoration of the Parliamentary Service Act so Parliament could run its own affairs independent of the government. Since 1992, government agencies such as the Public Services Department and Treasury have been staffing and maintaining Parliament, as the parliamentary service advisory committee had been disbanded in the wake of the act's repeal.

Nazri insisted that the PSA would have to pass muster through both the Dewan Rakyat and Dewan Negara (upper house of Parliament; also referred to as the Senate) House Committees before it could come to a vote in Parliament itself. This angered the MPs, and Shahrir Abdul Samad, the chairman of the Barisan Nasional Back-Benchers Club (BNBBC) called for all MPs in favour of immediately restoring the PSA to rise. A vast majority of MPs present rose, with some notable exceptions such as Nazri and Foreign Minister Syed Hamid Albar, who had campaigned for the act's repeal in 1992.

Some were skeptical of how much effect reviving the act would have on Parliamentary independence; Nazri argued he couldn't "see any less independence among MPs in the last 13 years without the PSA", and constitutional scholar Shad Saleem Faruqi called it a "merely symbolic gesture". Shahrir himself reportedly acknowledged the PSA's repeal had not made a serious impact on Parliamentary independence.

== Structure ==
The Parliamentary Service Act 1963 consisted of 8 sections.
