= Academic senate =

Academic governing body in some universities and colleges

An academic senate, sometimes termed faculty senate, academic board or simply senate, is a governing body in some universities and colleges, typically with responsibility for academic matters and primarily drawing its membership from the academic staff of the institution.

Models of university governance can be unitary (also called unicameral) or dual (also called bicameral). Unicameral models may involve leadership by either an academic senate-type body or, more commonly, a lay-led board/council-type body. In this arrangement, a senate-type body may still exist but in an advisory role to the board-type body that has full responsibility for governance. Bicameral models almost always involve both a senate and a board; these can be 'traditional' with the two bodies have distinct but equally important portfolios, typically a senate-type body having responsibility for academic matters and a board-type body having responsibility for finance and strategy, or 'asymmetric' with one body (typically the board) being dominant in the decision-making process.

== International variations ==
Within the European Higher Education Area (EHEA), there are some countries where universities are governed exclusively by senates. Analysis of systems in EHEA countries by E. Pruvot and T. Estermann, published in 2018, found that universities in Ireland, Estonia, Latvia and Poland had unitary governance with a senate-type governing body. As of 2022, of university systems in Europe analysed for the European University Association (EUA) by the same authors and N. Popkhadze, only the Brandenburg region of Germany (not included in the earlier analysis) retained this system, with Poland being classified as dual-asymmetric and Latvia and Estonia as traditional dual governance systems, having previously been considered unitary-senate models in analysis published in 2017, prior to governance reforms in those countries; there is no noted reform for Ireland but it is also re-classified as dual-asymmetric.

In some EHEA countries, senates either do not exist or, where they do, they are an advisory body with no real power. Pruvot and Estermann found that Belgium (Flanders), Iceland, Denmark, Sweden, Norway and Portugal all have board-based unitary models, although Denmark, Iceland and Portugal mandate the existence of an advisory senate without decision-making powers, and some older universities in Sweden have also retained a senate. Additionally, the Netherlands has a dual government system with two boards rather than a board and a senate. The 2022 analysis includes Belgium (Wallonia-Brussels) and Turkey (neither of which was included in Pruvot and Esterman (2018)'s analysis) as having unitary governance models.

Asymmetric dual governance models with both a board and a senate are found in the Czech Republic, Croatia, Finland, Hungary, Luxembourg and France. Boards tend to be dominant, with the senate having real but limited decision-making power. The 2022 analysis adds Georgia, Ireland, Poland, Romania, Scotland and Spain (all but Ireland and Poland, which have been re-classified from unitary-senate, were not included in the earlier analysis) as having dual-asymmetric governance, but considers the Czech Republic to be a traditional dual governance model.

Traditional dual governance models, where the senate typically has responsibility for academic matters and the board for strategic planning and budgets, are found in Austria, North Rhine–Westphalia (Germany), Italy, Serbia, Slovakia and Slovenia. It is also common in the UK, where governance varies between institutions. The 2022 analysis is in agreement, classifying England as traditional dual, although Scotland (not included in 2018) is considered to be dual-asymmetric. It also adds Estonia and Latvia, following governance reforms, the Czech Republic, which is reclassified from dual-asymmetric, and Hesse (Germany), Cyprus and Lithuania that were not previously included.

Senates in the US tend to be larger and to have more sub-committees than senates in England or Australia, while very small senates (few than 30 members) are most common in Australia (where they are typically termed academic boards). US and Australian senates normally have elected chairs, while in England the senate is chaired by the vice-chancellor (the chief executive and chief academic officer of the university).

Australian senates are less likely to be statutory bodies than those in the US or England, with only 37% being established as governing boards in their own right in a bicameral system and the others instead being sub-committees of the university council in a unicameral governance system. In the US, just under half (48%) of senates are statutory bodies, while in England two thirds (67%) have this status. The low percentage of senates that are statutory bodies in Australia has been driven, at least in part, by state legislation imposing unicameral governance similar to that found in England's post-1992 universities on their institutions. This similarity extends to the relatively narrow scope of responsibilities of the senates in Australia and in England's post-1992 universities, which is reflected in Australian senates having fewer sub-committees than their counterparts in England or the US.

== Canada ==
Bicameral governance systems are common at publicly funded universities in Canada. and are required for accountability and the decision-making process. In bicameral governance systems there are two governing bodies, the Senate and the Board of Governors. The Senate typically has oversight over the academic mission, strategy, educational policy and programming. The Board of Governors contributes to the overall strategic direction and oversees financial and operational decisions.

There are some parallels between university governance structures and other public sector models however university governance differs in four fundamental areas: publicly funded universities in Canada are created and governed by an act of legislation which establishes the governance structure; universities operate within a legislative and regional context; academic freedom; role of president who is appointed by the Board of Governors with consultation with Senate and the university community.

== United Kingdom ==
Academic governance in the UK is normally defined at the level of individual universities, in their constitutional documents, except for the ancient universities of Scotland (see § Scotland below). Depending on the university, the relevant constitutional documents may be a royal charter and statutes (most pre-1992 universities), statutes made either by ancient right or under an act of parliament (Oxford, Cambridge, Durham, London, Newcastle and Royal Holloway), or the instrument of government or articles of association (post-1992 universities and the LSE). Changes to these must normally be confirmed by the Privy Council before going into effect (see Universities in the United Kingdom § Governance). In general, the constitutional documents define the existence of the senate (in universities that have a senate), but whether the powers of the senate are defined in the constitutional documents or left to ordinances passed by the governing body differs between institutions.

The "public interest governance principles" that apply to all higher education providers in England as a condition of registration with the Office for Students include academic governance, with the expectation that the institution will have a senate, academic board or equivalent to provide academic governance to the institution. This imposes the responsibility on the governing body (council, board of trustees, etc.) that: "The governing body receives and tests assurance that academic governance is adequate and effective through explicit protocols with the senate/academic board (or equivalent)".

With the exception of Oxford and Cambridge and the ancient Scottish universities, most pre-1992 universities follow a bicameral 'civic' model, with responsibilities split between a university council and an academic senate. A difference may be seen, however, between a traditional academic senate, which is the academic authority responsible for the award of degrees under their powers as the senate defined in the constitutional documents, for example, Durham and Sheffield, and other academic bodies such as the academic board at UCL, which "advises the Council on all academic matters and questions affecting the educational policy of UCL" and which recommends the award of degrees, or at Wolverhampton where the academic board is responsible for academic standards and "procedures for the award of qualifications" but formal responsibility for the exercise of degree awarding powers lies with the board of governors. However, some bodies denominated as senates, such as those at Bristol and the University of East Anglia, only hold delegated authority from their university's council rather than having authority in their own right under the university's constitutional documents.

=== Historical development ===
The oldest university senate in the UK is at the University of Cambridge (see University of Cambridge § Senate and the Regent House). However, this is the assembly of all MA graduates, similar to convocation at Oxford and Durham (and formerly at London), rather than an academic body. The senatus academicus at Edinburgh emerged at the start of the 17th century as the senior body within the university itself (then governed by the town council), containing the principal and the regents. Disputes between the senatus academicus and the town council on the early 19th century over which body had the authority to make degree regulations led to a royal commission in 1826–30 and eventually the 1858 Universities (Scotland) Act, which removed the governance of the university from the town council. The senate at Glasgow, consisting of the rector, dean of faculties and the professors, also emerged in the early 17th century and was responsible for conferring degrees and other matters internal to the university. It operated alongside the 'faculty', a committee consisting of the principal and the holders of the thirteen oldest chairs, which had the management of the revenue and property of the university. Both of these were merged into the senatus academicus under the 1858 act.

When St David's College, Lampeter, University College London, King's College London and Durham University were established in the 1820s and early 1830s, academics were not initially involved in their governance. However, the situation did not last, with the first academic senates in England being established in the 1830s. Complaints of poor teaching against the professor of anatomy at UCL in 1829 (only a year after its opening) led to him being sacked, causing splits in the council (appointed by the shareholders) and a loss of confidence in the warden on the part of the college's professors. The warden resigned in 1831 and his office was abolished, and in 1832 the senate was established to give the professors more autonomy, although under a lay chair. This became the professorial board in 1907, when UCL was merged into the University of London. It is now the academic board of UCL, and is an exception to the normal modern practice of the senate being a representative body (see below), including all professors as well as elected representatives of other academic and non-academic staff. Proposals to replace the academic board with a smaller senate were rejected in 2020.

At Durham, the chapter of Durham Cathedral (the governors of the university under the 1832 act that established it) passed a "fundamental statute" in 1835, passing the normal running of the institution over to an academic senate and a convocation of the members of the university. The senate, consisting initially of the warden, the three professors, the two proctors, and a member of convocation nominated by the dean and chapter, ran the ordinary business of the university and proposed regulations that convocation could confirm our reject. However, the chapter, as governors of the university until 1909, retained the power to overrule the senate and convocation or to take independent action, which they did on four occasions in the 19th century.

The former senate of the University of London, established by its charter in 1836, was the general governing body of the university, appointed by the government and without any academic staff representation – the university at that time being an examining board that did not have any academic staff.

In the universities established in first half of the 20th century, senates were generally only given limited powers while there was little check on the powers of the council. An exception to this was Manchester, which (as Owen's College, in 1880) has been identified as the origin of the bicameral civic system. Here, the senate was given the right to be consulted on all legislation and to give opinions on any matter concerning the university. Leeds followed Manchester, while Durham's 1937 statutes went even further, constituting the senate as the supreme academic body and giving it the right to be consulted on financial matters that affected the university's educational policy. This was the first time the senate was defined as 'supreme' when it came to academic matters, which would become common in the 1960s. It also introduced the innovation that all professors were not ex officio members of senate but instead formed an electoral constituency that selected representatives on senate, in the same manner as the non-professorial staff. The right of senates to be consulted generally grew over the course of the 20th century, with the model charter issued by the Privy Council in 1963 giving rights to senates to initiate and be consulted on legislation and on staff appointments, while still retaining a list of powers reserved to councils, including full control of financial matters.

However, the polytechnics, incorporated as Higher Education Corporations, that became universities in 1992 had a unicameral structure with little academic representation on their board their academic board being merely advisory to the vice-chancellor and the board. Government reviews, particularly the Dearing Review in 1997, pushed older universities towards this more corporate style of management. The Committee of University Chairs' code of best practice also reinforced that councils should have ultimate responsibility, with little concept of shared governance. There has also been a rise in the power of the executive at universities, linked to the increase in the importance of the 'higher education market'. As a result, senates, which tend to be large bodies that meet infrequently, have lost power relative to councils and executives in the pre-1992 universities. However, there are large differences between institutions in this regard, with some senates still retaining a large amount of power.

=== Scotland ===
In Scotland, the senatus academicus is the supreme academic body of an ancient university, given legal authority by the Universities (Scotland) Acts. The senatus is responsible for authorising degree programmes, issuing degrees to graduands and honorary recipients, and for the discipline of students. Membership includes ex officio and elected members, and generally comprises:

Ex officio

- The Principal (President of the Senate)
- Vice-principals
- The secretary of court
- Deans of faculties
- Professors of the university
- Heads of academic departments
- Directors of academic services (e.g. library)
- Student members

At the University of Glasgow, the Clerk of Senate (whose office is equivalent to that of a vice-principal) and Secretary of Court are also ex officio members of the Senate.

== United States ==
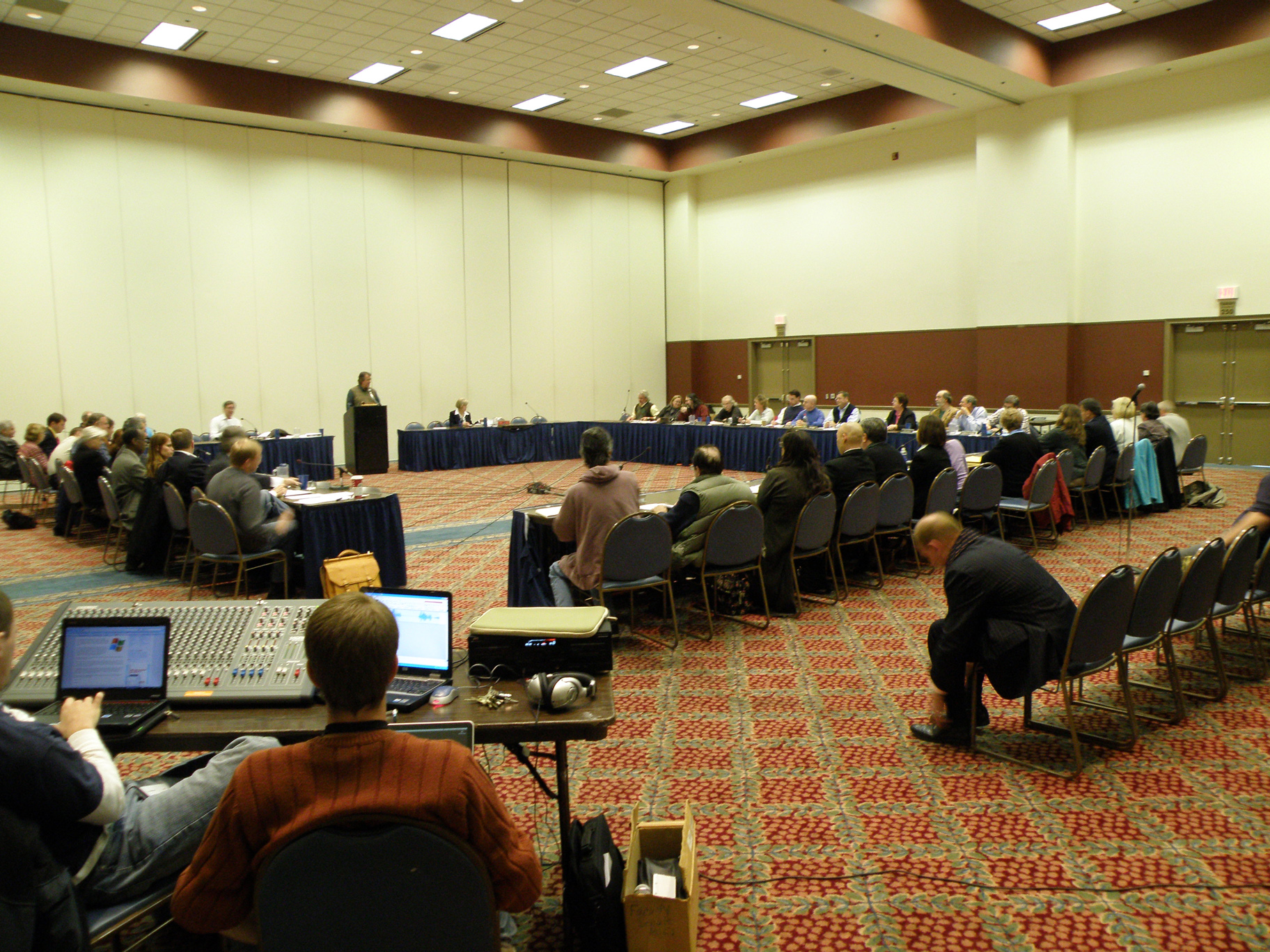
A meeting of the Academic Senate at Georgia Southern University.

In the United States of America the academic senate, also known as the faculty senate, is a governing body for a university made up of members of the faculty of the university. It was estimated in the 1980s that 60 to 80 per cent of university and college campuses in the US had some form of senate, and it is generally considered to be the standard form by which faculty participate in university governance. Most large American research universities have an academic senate, although Harvard University is one of the most prominent exceptions.

The academic senate normally creates university academic policy that applies to the university. The policy created by the academic senate is restricted to and must be congruent with policy by the university system of which the university is a member institution, any accreditation bodies, state laws and regulations, federal laws and regulations, and changes derived from judicial decisions at the state and federal levels of the court systems. While a majority of universities and colleges have some form of an academic senate, some claim that the organization has more of a ceremonial role. However some researchers have found a negative correlation between centralization of university administration and the presence of an academic senate indicating that an academic senate acts as an organizational force for the decentralization of a university in the area of academics.

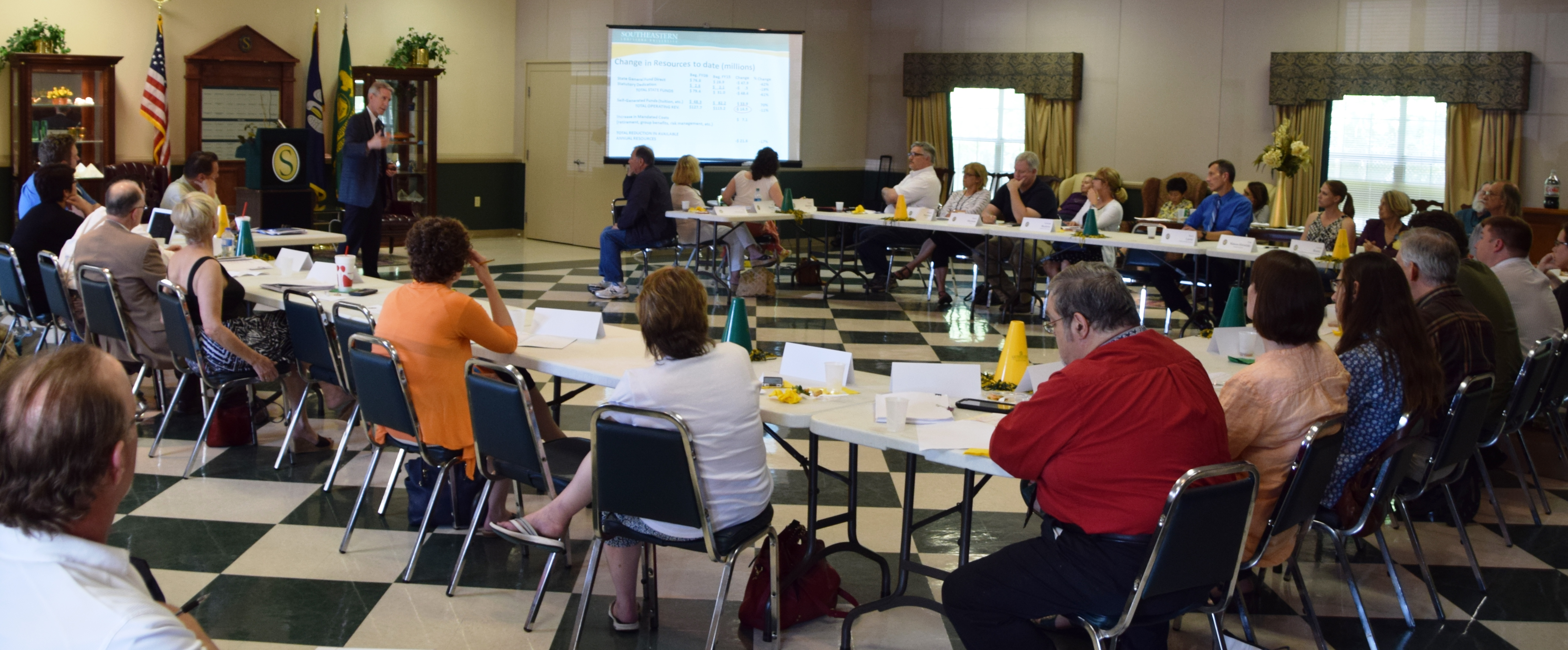
The Faculty Senate at Southeastern Louisiana University hears from University President John L. Crain about the Fiscal Year 2016 budget.

The academic senate meets periodically with a published agenda. Meetings normally use Robert's Rules of Order. The senate will have a set of committees, both standing committees and ad hoc or working committees, which are assigned particular areas of responsibility for policy formation.

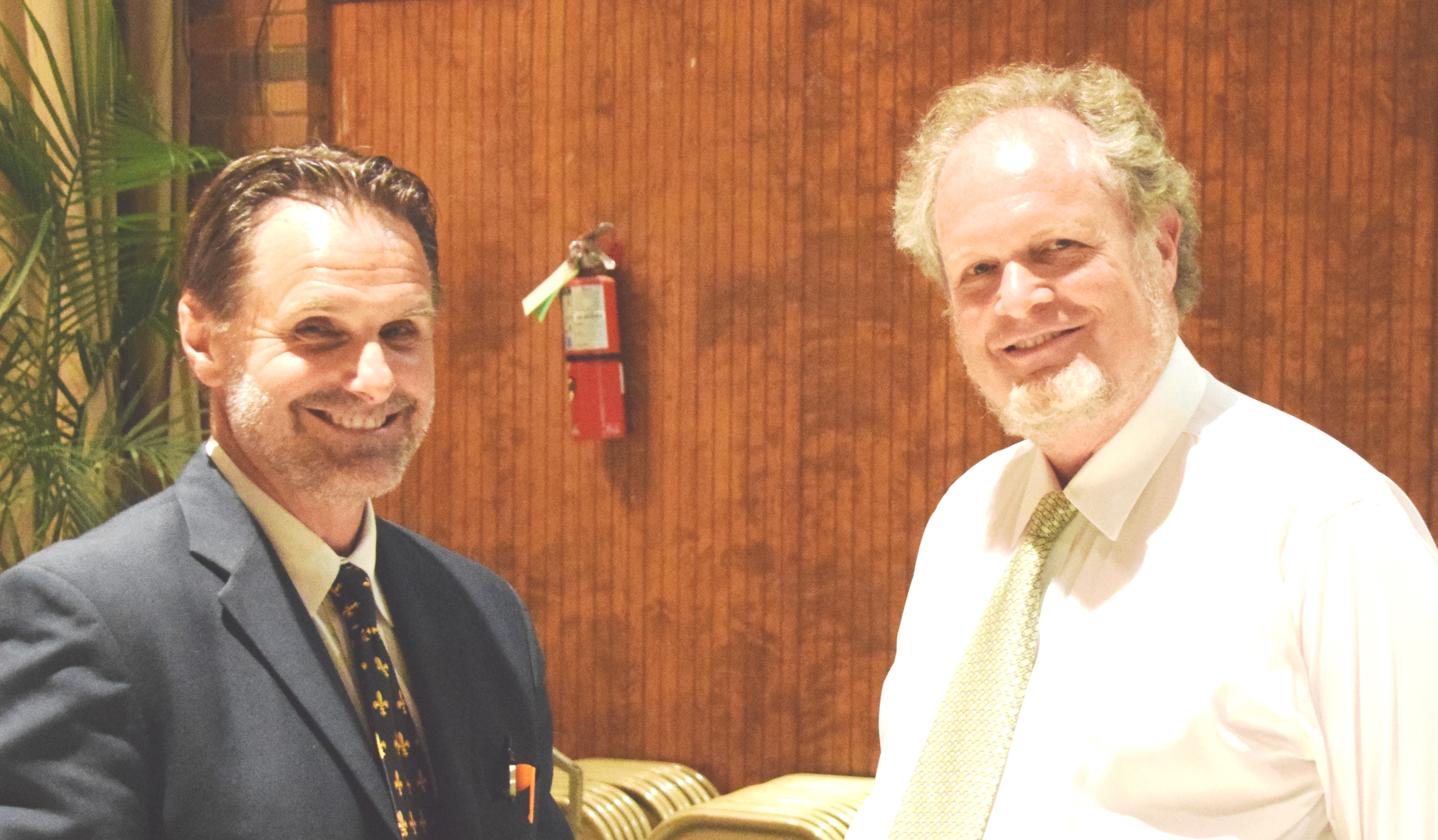
James D. Kirylo (left), president of Southeastern Louisiana University's Faculty Senate, confers with Kevin L. Cope, president of the Louisiana State University Faculty Senate and president of the Association of Louisiana Faculty Senates, at a program in Hammond during 2015 concerning the budget for public higher education in Louisiana.

The officers of the academic senate may include the president of the university and the provost of the university. Other officers are academic senate members who are elected to officer posts by the members of the senate. Deans of colleges as well as department chairs may be ex officio members of the academic senate.

Motions, recommendations, or actions that are generated by the academic senate through discussion and which are passed by the body are never final and will normally be referred to the president of the university for final approval. Depending on the authorizing legislation or statutes and types of recommendations being made, boards of trustees, boards of regents or the equivalent may have to authorize senate recommendations.

== See also ==
- Academic administration
- Ancient university governance in Scotland
- General council (Scottish university)
- University council
- University court
