= Charter of Grenoble =

The Charter of Grenoble is a founding document of the movement of student unionism. It was written by the National Union of Students of France, at the Congress of Grenoble in 1946.

== Text of the charter ==
Preamble

The representatives of French students, meeting in national Congress on 24 April 1946 in good form, conscious of their historic and epochal conditions:

Whereas the French Union establishes a new declaration of the rights of man and citizen,

Whereas it builds a statute of peace among nations,

Whereas the world of work and of youth sets loose the bases of an economic and social revolution to serve Man,

Affirming the will to participate in the unanimous effort of reconstruction,

Faithful to the traditional aims pursued by the young students of France when they were most conscious of their mission,

Faithful to the example of the best among them, dead in the struggle of the French people for their liberty,

Noting the obsolete character of the governing institutions,

Declare the wish to place themselves, as they have often in the course of our history, at the vanguard of the French youth, in defining freely with bases in their tasks and demands the following principles:

Article 1: The student is a young intellectual worker.

Rights and duties of the student as a young person:

Article 2: As a young person the student has right to a particular social welfare, in the fields physique, intellectual and moral.

Article 3: As a young person the student has the duty to be integrated into the whole of world youth.

Rights and duties of the student as a worker:

Article 4: As a worker, the student has right to work and rest under the best conditions and material independence, as well personal as social, guaranteed by the free exercise of the trade-union rights.

Article 5: As a worker, the student has the duty to acquire the best technical skill.

Rights and duties of the student as an intellectual:

Article 6: As an intellectual, the student has the right to research of the truth and the freedom which is the condition first.

Article 7: As an intellectual, the student has the duty:To define, propagate and defend the truth, which implies the duty to make divide and progress the culture and to release the direction of the History. To defend freedom any oppression counters, which, for the intellectual, constitutes the most crowned mission.

== See also ==
- Student activism
- Student voice
