= University court =

Administrative body of a university in the United Kingdom

A university court is an administrative body of a university in the United Kingdom and other countries. In most older universities of England and Wales, the court is part of the governance structure and acts as a forum for local stakeholders from government, industry and the community to interact with the university. In Scotland, the court is the university's supreme governing body, analogous to the council in other British universities. At Oxford and Cambridge universities, the court was a local law court.

== England and Wales ==
In most older universities of England and Wales, and some newer universities the court is one of the three bodies in the governance structure, along with the council (equivalent to the board of directors) and senate (responsible for academic affairs). This model developed in the civic universities of England, starting with the Victoria University in 1880. The court was original the overall governing body, consisting of a large (40 or more at the Victoria University, over a hundred at the University of Birmingham, representing the 'great and good' of local society as well as other stakeholders) with council as the executive governing body. Court's powers usually included legislation and sometimes appointment of the vice-chancellor and other officers, and the election of the chancellor. However, these were almost always merely confirmation of proposals from council, with contested chancellor elections unknown outside of Oxford. This model has evolved with councils becoming the single governing body in the 1980s and 1990s. In the 21st century, court has become a forum for local stakeholders from government, industry and the community to interact with the university. However, some courts retain the power to elect the chancellor, and the appointment of Griff Rhys Jones as chancellor of Cardiff University was blocked by the university court in 2014.

=== Oxford and Cambridge ===
Unlike in most universities, where the court is an assembly in the governance structure, at the ancient English universities of Oxford and Cambridge these were legal courts, the Court of the Chancellor or Vice-Chancellor of Oxford University and the Cambridge University Chancellor's Court respectively.

At Oxford University, the judge of the chancellor's court was the vice-chancellor, who was his deputy or assessor; the court had civil jurisdiction from 1244, to the exclusion of the king's courts, in all matters and suits wherein a scholar or privileged person of the university is one of the parties, except in actions relating to freehold. It also had, from 1290, jurisdiction over all injuries and trespasses against the peace, mayhem and felony excepted, but this may have been removed by the 19th century Summary Jurisdiction Acts.

The criminal jurisdiction of Cambridge University in cases where any person not a member of the university is a party has ceased, and its jurisdiction over 'light women' (i.e. prostitutes), which was founded on a charter and statute of Elizabeth, was taken away in 1894 by a private act of that year, when an earlier act dealing with them and applicable till then only to Oxford University, was extended to Cambridge University. Before 1891, women of 'light character', who had been convicted of consorting with or soliciting members of the university in statu pupillari, were detained in a house of correction called the 'Spinning House', but in that year a conviction was held bad.

All jurisdiction over non-university matters was removed from both the Oxford and Cambridge courts by the Administration of Justice Act 1977.

=== Durham and Newcastle ===
Neither of the pre-Victorian English universities (Durham and London), which pre-date the civic university movement, had courts at their foundation. During the 20th century both had courts created of less than 30 members with charge of federal finances and property for a period, but these were subsequently abolished as their federal structures changed.

The court of Durham University was created in 1937 by statutes made under the University of Durham Act 1935 and abolished in 1963 under the Universities of Durham and Newcastle-upon-Tyne Act 1963, which separated the Newcastle division of the federal university to create Newcastle University. Durham's court was similar to the courts of the ancient universities of Scotland or the councils of most British universities, having responsibility for finance and the administration of the federal university's property and consisting of between 24 and 27 members, with significant internal membership but a majority from outside the university. The other governance bodies at the time at Durham were the senate and convocation, with convocation being a large body (of graduates of the university) that filled the role of the court at most British universities. As with the current council of Durham University, the Dean of Durham (the head of the cathedral chapter) was an ex-officio lay member of the court. After it became independent from Durham, Newcastle University retained a convocation (following Durham's model) and established a court (under the civic university model). While Newcastle's convocation is responsible for appointing the chancellor, this is on the nomination of court and council in joint session, and it is court that has the power to request changes to the statutes from the privy council (on the recommendation of university's council).

=== London ===
The court of the University of London was created in 1929 by statutes made under the University of London Act 1926. As with Durham, this was a smaller body with responsibility for finance and property of the federal university, originally with 16 members but rising to 24 in 1981. The abolition of both court and senate and their replacement by a single executive council was recommended by a report in 1991 and effected by the University of London Act 1994.

== Scotland ==
The university courts were first established for the ancient universities by the Universities (Scotland) Act 1858 and they are responsible for the finances and administration of each university. Each university, subject to approval by the Privy Council of the United Kingdom, determines the constitution of its court, with members coming from within each university, the local community and beyond.

At an ancient university the court is chaired by the rector, who ranks third after the chancellor and vice-chancellor, is elected by all the matriculated students of each university. Members are also appointed by the general council, academic senate and local authority.

At more modern universities there is usually a chairman or convenor appointed along lines similar to a chairman of the board in a corporation or charity.

The president of the students' representative council is usually a member and lay members are co-opted onto the court.

== See also ==
- University council
- Academic senate
- Ancient university governance in Scotland
