= Shad Saleem Faruqi =

Malaysian legal scholar (born 1946)

Yang Berbahagia Datuk Shad Saleem Faruqi
- Born: Shad Saleem Faruqi; 17 November 1946 (age 79); New Delhi, India
- Occupations: Emeritus Professor of Law & Legal Advisor

Shad Saleem Faruqi is a Malaysian legal scholar and professor of law at the University of Malaya, currently holding the Tunku Abdul Rahman Chair as Professor of Constitutional Law. He is also the fourth holder of the Tun Hussein Onn Chair in International Studies at the Institute of Strategic and International Studies (ISIS) Malaysia effective July 2019 to June 2021. He has served Universiti Teknologi MARA in Shah Alam, Selangor in various capacities from 1971 onwards. He served as the Head of the Diploma in Law programme (1979–1984), as Assistant Rector (1996–1999), Assistant Vice-Chancellor (1999–2001) and Legal Advisor (1996–2006, 2010–2017).

He has also served in the faculties of law at the International Islamic University Malaysia, part-time at Universiti Kebangsaan Malaysia and a visiting professor/Honorary Legal Adviser/Holder of the Tun Sambanthan Chair at Universiti Sains Malaysia, Penang.

== Education ==
He was educated in Colonel Brown Cambridge School and at the age of 19, Shad Faruqi graduated from Wesleyan University in the United States with a degree in government. He went on to complete his LLB (First Class, First Position) and LLM (First Class, First Position) from Aligarh Muslim University, India and his PhD from International Islamic University Malaysia where he was supervised by the renowned Ahmad bin Ibrahim.

== Work and contributions ==
In 1991 as part of an Asia Foundation Project, he drafted the constitution of the Republic of Maldives. He was a one-time member and Secretary-General of the Manila-based Congressional Research and Training Services that conducted several institutional efficacy courses for legislators from many third world countries. He has presented seminar papers in the USA, UK, Germany, Iran, Kenya, Sudan, Maldives, India, Singapore, Thailand, Philippines, Hong Kong, Australia and Japan. He has helped to draft several international documents including the Kuala Lumpur Declaration to Criminalize War and a document for the UN on Protection for Places of Worship. He is a sitting Judge on the Kuala Lumpur War Crimes Tribunal. He is an Executive Council member of the Kuala Lumpur-based International Centre for Law and Legal Studies.

At the national level, he has been called upon on several occasions to draft national legislation. On behalf of Institut Teknologi MARA he drafted the Institut Teknologi MARA (Amendment) Bill 1996 that went on to become an Act of Parliament. In 1999 he drafted the Universiti Teknologi MARA (Amendment) Bill that was enacted by Parliament as Act A1073. The Act converted Institut Teknologi MARA into a full-fledged university.

At the end of 2004, the Barisan Nasional Back-Benchers Club of the Parliament of Malaysia appointed him as a consultant to advise them on reforming and empowering Parliament in the face of the executive branch's dominance of the Malaysian Government.

In 2006, the Minister of Education appointed him Chairman of a Committee to propose amendments to the Universities and University Colleges Act 1971 [Act 30]. The Committee's recommendations were adopted as law in early 2009. In 2008, he drafted the new 'Apex Constitution' of Universiti Sains Malaysia. In 2010 he was reappointed to a committee to review the Universities and University Colleges Act 1971 [Act 30]. He is also a member of the Apex University Initiative; a Distinguished Fellow of the Institute of Strategic Studies; and one-time member of the Malaysian Human Rights Commission's Education Sub-Committee.

== Awards and honours ==
In 2008, Universiti Sains Malaysia, Malaysia's first "apex university", appointed him as a visiting professor. Later he was appointed an Honorary Legal Advisor and the first holder of the Tun Sambanthan Chair. In 2009 UiTM honoured him with the University's first Emeritus Professorship award. In 2009, the Yang di-Pertuan Agong (King) of Malaysia honoured him with the federal title of "Datuk".

=== Honours of Malaysia ===
- Malaysia : Honorary Companion of the Order of Loyalty to the Crown of Malaysia (J.S.M.) (2000)
- Malaysia : Commander of the Order of Meritorious Service (P.J.N.) (2009)

== Authorship ==
=== Articles ===
Between 1982–1985 Shad contributed periodic articles and editorials to the New Straits Times. During 2001 and 2002 he authored a regular weekly column "Facets of Our Constitution" for the Sunday Star. His column "Document of Destiny" appeared in The Sun from 2006 to 2007. Presently he writes a fortnightly column "Reflecting on the Law" for the Star. he has written the following articles:

- Faruqi, Shad Saleem The Kuala Lumpur War Crimes Commission & War Crimes Tribunal.
- Faruqi, Shad Saleem Freedom of religion under the Constitution.
- Faruqi, Shad Saleem (18 November 2009). Understanding Our Basic Rights.

=== Books ===
Shad is the author of Human Rights, Globalisation and the Asian Economic Crisis, Islam International Law and the War Against Terrorism, Islam, Democracy and Development,Document of Destiny: The Constitution of the Federation of Malaysia and "The Bedrock of Our Nation: Our Constitution". He is the co-author of Media Law & Regulations in Malaysia and Co-editor of "Decolonising Our Universities – Towards a Non-Eurocentric Paradigm". He has contributed over 350 articles to legal periodicals, anthologies and newspapers and has presented over 300 seminar papers in 15 countries including the US, UK, Australia, Germany and Japan.
