= General Students Assembly =

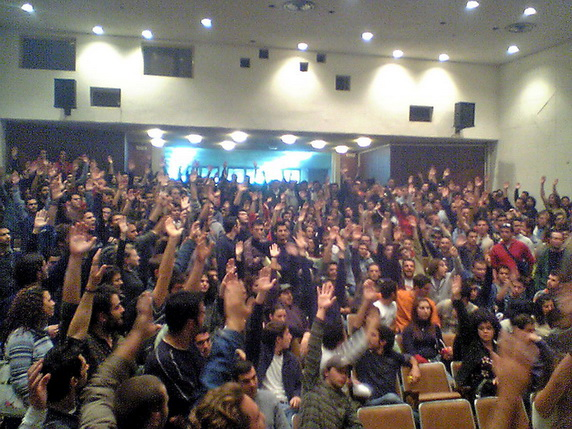
Voting process in a Greek Student Assembly

The General Students Assembly is the supreme and sovereign body of the association of students in every university in Greece. It decides on every subject and exercises supervision and control over other institutions of the association. It is the supreme decision-making body of the Association (union of students), comprising all members of the club and take decisions by majority vote after an open debate on the issues. Every faculty has its own assembly, for example: General Student Assembly of the Faculty of History, General Student Assembly of the Faculty of Mathematics.

Many associations of students have a student council which is accountable to the general assembly and shall transfer to the administration of the university its decisions and to prepare them.

The Administration of the Universities is obliged to consider every decision of the assemblies very seriously, as stated in the Law for the Functioning of Universities.

== History ==
Student Unions and General Student Assemblies exist in every state university in Greece. The right to form such assemblies is guaranteed by the Law of the Universities in Greece, introduced in 1974, after the fall of the Greek military junta. From this point on, a number of rights were given to the members of the academic community, in the spirit of democracy and freedom of expression, following the struggle against the military dictatorship in the preceding years. Since then, these associations have been leading the political activity of Greek students.

== Membership ==
Every student that is registered in a university, is automatically a member of that university's Student Union and has the right to participate in assemblies.

In most of the cases, members of the Union (and therefore of the assemblies) cannot be students who:

a) have large public property
b) have police status
c) belong to fascistic, anti-democratic organizations, cooperate with them or engage in similar activities within the university
d) have permanent military status

== Responsibilities of the assembly ==
Every university in the country has its own Statute of Student Union, which describes how the union operates. Despite some minor differences, all statutes follow the same, basic directions of the functions of student assemblies:

1. It has full control over the work of the Student Council
2. It may discharge members from the Student Union
3. It may decide on amendments to the Statute
4. It may decide on the dissolution of the Student Union
5. It judges the actions of the Administration of Universities or of the Ministry of Education, proposes and demands for changes. It has the power to discuss and decide for every subject that refers to education and social life, as a whole

== Decision making ==
The decisions of the assemblies are taken by majority after an open vote with raising of hands. The assembly and the decisions are not valid if less than one-third (1/3) of the students are present. In such cases, the council must announce another assembly in the next five days, with the same subjects. Then, the number of students present in this Assembly cannot be less than the one-fourth (1/4). If the number of students still isn't enough in the second attempt, the council must announce, for the third and final time, an Assembly in the next two to six days, in which the decisions would be valid, regardless of attendance.

To take decisions on changing the “Statute of Student Union” or to dissolve the Union, an absolute majority of at least 50% of all members of the Union is required. Changing the goals of the Union requires consensus, not just voting.

The decisions of the General Assembly are absolutely mandatory for all students-members of the Union.

== Moderators ==
In every Assembly, the students choose moderators in order to better organize the discussion. The moderators count the votes of the students and sign the official papers with the decisions at the end of every Assembly. They also have the responsibility to give a speaking opportunity, in succession, to anyone who asks for it, as well as to control the students who don’t respect the procedure. The moderators are the ones who declare the opening and closing of the General Student Assembly and they have the right to stop and dissolve any assembly that is too noisy and out of order.

== Frequency of the assemblies ==
Regular General Student Assemblies are held after the decision of the student council twice in a school year. The choice of subjects that will be discussed is open to all the students.

Special General Student Assemblies are held for urgent and serious matters of the Union (in cases of rising student movements and protests, assemblies can be held every week). There are several ways to call a Special Assembly such as for the student council to decide it or the students to gather signatures from 1/10 of all the students in their faculty. In this case, the subject of the assembly must be concrete and the president of the student council is obliged to call for assembly no later than 3 days after the signatures are gathered.

== See also ==
- Students' union
- Student activism
- Youth participation
- Deliberative democracy

== Notes and references ==
- Statute of the Student Union of Political Sciences in the University of Thessaloniki
- Statute of the Student Union of Mathematics, University of Crete
- List of Student Unions of the University of the Aegean
- Statute of the Student Union of Geography, University of the Aegean
