= General council (Scottish university) =

Corporate body of Scottish ancient universities

The general council of an ancient university in Scotland is the corporate body of all graduates and senior academics of each university. They were instituted by the Universities (Scotland) Act 1858, but each has had its constitution and organisation considerably altered by subsequent statutes.

The 1858 act established a tripartite structure of the general council (advisory body), university court (finance and administration), and academic senate (academic affairs).

The chancellor of each university is elected by the general council and is president of the council.

== Role ==
The business of each council is to take into consideration all questions affecting the well-being and prosperity of each university, and to make representations from time to time on such questions to the university court, who shall consider the same, and return to the council their deliverance thereon.

Each council elects assessors to the university court. No member of the senatus academicus is entitled to vote or take part in the election of any assessor of the general council (the senate elects its own assessors to the court).

Under the Universities (Scotland) Act 1966, new ordinances and resolutions are communicated in draft form to the general council, whose opinion thereon is taken into consideration.

The general councils of the four ancient universities in Scotland are advisory bodies to the respective university whose membership is all the graduates and academics of the university.

The most significant functions of the general council is appointing people to serve on the university court (the governing body of each university), of whom there must be at least four, and of electing the chancellor. The chancellor is the titular head of the university and serves for life.

Its terms of reference also include the requirement to "take into consideration all questions affecting the well-being and prosperity of the University" and "make representations from time to time on such questions to the University Court". These activities are carried out by half-yearly meetings whilst a Business Committee prepares the papers put forward to these meetings.

== History ==
The origins of the general council lie in the reforming spirit of the 19th century. The universities at that time suffered from varying degrees of difficulty. Glasgow was relatively successful. It was felt that Aberdeen would benefit from the union of its two institutions. St Andrews was slowly recovering from the lean times of the 18th century but still had problems with dilapidated buildings. It was the problems of government at the University of Edinburgh: a dispute between the professors and Edinburgh Town Council, ending in the courts, that led to the Royal Commission on the Universities and Colleges of Scotland, established in 1826. This commission reported in 1831 after exhaustive work and recommended that university courts look after administrative and financial matters, while academic senates would determine matters related to teaching.

The conversion of the commission's report into legislation was much delayed by political expediency. During this time the alumni of the universities, led by James Lorimer, began to push for reforms beyond those of the commission, including giving the graduates some voice in the government of the universities. The creation of a corporate body of graduates would enhance the value of graduation and introduce young minds to the running of the universities. In addition, such a body would, "be a means for inducing those alumni who become prosperous and influential, to promote the interests of institutions with which they had thus all along continued to be connected." By this Lorimer had in mind the endowment of the universities by wealthy graduates.

Others, loosely connected with Lorimer's group, saw the possibility of securing a parliamentary vote for graduates and this indeed came to pass. The Scottish universities elected three members of Parliament up until the abolition of pluralism in the Act of 1948.

In 1857 Lorimer was invited to draft what was to become the Universities (Scotland) Act 1858, which established the court, senate and general council structure.

Today, general councils are generally limited in the issues to which it can competently contribute since its response time is essentially the six months between meetings. The royal commission of 1876 appointed to investigate the results of the act of 1858 found that "the attendance at the meetings of Council is relatively very small," and the same comment is applicable today.

The University of St Andrews takes the winter meeting to other venues than St Andrews has been reasonably successful in boosting attendances. These meetings can be a good way to identify potential new members of court. The university is keen to maintain a dialogue with graduates. There is the possibility in future that digital communications may assist members who are spread around the world to contribute.

The activities general councils now mainly consider the longer-term future of each university and promote their histories and cultures.

== See also ==
- General Council of the University of St Andrews
