= Universities and University Colleges Act 1971 (Malaysia) =

Malaysian statute

Parliament of Malaysia
- Long title: An Act to provide for the establishment, maintenance and administration of Universities and University Colleges and for other matters connected with it.
- Citation: Act 30
- Territorial extent: Throughout Malaysia
- Passed by: Dewan Rakyat
- Passed: 18 March 1971
- Passed by: Dewan Negara
- Passed: 26 March 1971
- Royal assent: 27 April 1971
- Commenced: 29 April 1971
- Effective: 30 April 1971

Legislative history

Initiating chamber: Dewan Rakyat
- Bill title: Universities and University Colleges Bill 1971
- Bill citation: D.R.40/1971
- Introduced by: Hussein Onn, Minister of Education
- First reading: 9 March 1971
- Second reading: 17 March 1971
- Third reading: 18 March 1971

Revising chamber: Dewan Negara
- Bill title: Universities and University Colleges Bill 1971
- Bill citation: D.R.40/1971
- Member(s) in charge: Hussein Onn, Minister of Education
- First reading: 22 March 1971
- Second reading: 26 March 1971
- Third reading: 26 March 1971

Repeals
- Emergency (Essential Powers) Ordinance No. 74, 1971

Amended by
- Universities and University Colleges (Amendment) Act 1971 [Act A80] Universities and University Colleges (Amendment) Act 1975 [Act A295] Universities and University Colleges (Amendment) Act 1983 [Act A550] Universities and University Colleges (Amendment) Act 1996 [Act A946] Universities and University Colleges (Amendment) Act 2009 [Act A1342] Universities and University Colleges (Amendment) Act 2012 [Act A1433] Universities and University Colleges (Amendment) Act 2019 [Act A1582] Universities and University Colleges (Amendment) Act 2024 [Act A1713]

Keywords
- University, university college
- Status: In force

University and University College Act 1971 (Malay: Akta Universiti dan Kolej Universiti 1971) or AUKU is the main legislation that governs the establishment, organization and management of public universities and public university colleges in Malaysia. It was passed by the Malaysian parliament in 1971 and went into effect on 30 April the same year. The government body that is responsible for the implementation of this Act is the Ministry of Higher Education.

== Structure ==
The Universities and University Colleges Act 1971, in its current form (1 August 2012), consists of 5 Parts containing 27 sections and 2 schedules (including 6 amendments).

- Part I: Preliminary
- Part II: Higher Education
- Part IIA: Administration
- Part III: Universities
- Part IV: University Colleges
- Part IVA: Register and Database
- Part V: General
- Schedules

== Controversy and Student repression ==
According to Abdullah Haji Abdul Karim, Director of the Central PAS Youth Department for Student Affairs, in a statement he made on the Harakah Daily website, although it was obvious that AUKU 1971 bill was passed to provide for the establishment, maintenance and administration of University and University Colleges and for other matters connected therewith, in the new sections that were entered into it after the 1975 amendment (argued for by then-Education Minister Mahathir Mohamad) through the A295 Amendment Act, among which are Sections 15A, 15B, 15C, 15D, 16A, 16B and 16C, clearly opposed the principles of justice within the law. The main goals of the 1975 amendment blocks:

- the involvement of students in political parties and labour unions, and
- the union of student bodies

However, the 2012 and 2018 amendment abolished Section 15A, thus providing students' involvement in politics. Despite these amendments, several student activists demanded that the law to be abolished to re-establish democracy in campus.
