= University Radio Essex =

Campus radio station for the University of Essex

University Radio Essex is a campus radio station at the University of Essex serving Wivenhoe Park in Colchester. It was one of the original university radio stations in the United Kingdom and with the other pioneering campus radio stations at York, Brunel, Loughborough, Sussex, Surrey the door was opened in the UK for campus radio.

== Format ==
The radio station was funded by the Student Union at the University of Essex, and changed identity to RED - 1404 AM in Autumn 2001. URE first broadcast on the 1 March 1971, on 301 metres medium wave (originally 998 kHz, later 999 kHz AM). It later broadcast on 963 kHz AM, 1404 kHz AM, 1602 kHz AM, and 87.7 MHz FM.

Programming format is predominantly music, with some news programmes including the award-winning Tower to Tower magazine programme.

== Early history ==
Campus radio at Essex University started with the protests that ripped through the campus in 1968, followed by a long blockade of the boundary road surrounding the Wivenhoe Park campus at the University of Essex. One of the demands of the protagonists was that a student radio station may be set up. For its day, this was reported to be not an unusual demand, considering the only alternatives at the time were the BBC Home or Light programmes - or pirate radio, from boats anchored in the North Sea.

It took several years for radio to become a reality in the UK. Essex URE was beaten to air by University Radio York. Preparation and licensing had begun with members of the Students Union and the university's Amateur Radio Society, several members of whom were also members of the station's technical team. There was a close affiliation between the station, the amateur radio society and the Union Technical Organisation (UTO) who did stage lighting and provided disco services on campus.

By the time the station was ready to go on air, the central Student Union building had been built above Square 3, as had the first two towers. As a mark of the importance that the university attached to the station at the time, installation of cables for induction loops was already planned in the construction of the residential tower blocks (they were laid along a duct that runs between the towers).

The original mixer, with rotary volume controls was built by students, and assembled along with inexpensive turntables.

Meanwhile, the Student Union had great plans for their station - and dedicated three rooms in the union corridor for the new station. At the top of the stairs in the union building there was a large reception area and office (also used as the location for the transmission equipment) leading to a corridor with the main on air studio (studio A), and a talk studio (studio B - also known as the passenger studio) with a window between them. The studio B had a table for round table discussions. An article in the university magazine Wyvern in October 2001 written by one of the creators of URE notes that

"Sound deadening, was originally provided by egg boxes glued to the wall. After the University fire office found out, the whole lot had to be ripped down, and heavy curtains used instead".

The idea at the time was that for occasional music programmes and news programs presenters would sit in the passenger studio B while an engineer would play the discs and otherwise operate the controls from studio A. In 1976 this layout was changed, with studio B divided so that a further studio, studio C was created, as a small self-op presenters music studio.

At some point later in the 1970s this configuration was changed with a further studio room added. As at UKC Radio this layout soon proved wildly impractical, because most presenters would sit in the self-op studio, leaving the centre and end studio unoccupied except for the daily union discussion programmes, and occasional news broadcasts.

A second studio suite was built at Wivenhoe House (original stately home of Wivenhoe Park on which the university was built, and was the home of the vice chancellor's offices and other admin) with a landline connection to the main studios. The intention was to produce documentary programs and news at Wivenhoe House. The studio was never actively used for broadcasting.

The studios were swapped in 1980 with the arrival of a Magnetic Tapes Ltd 12 channel desk (called "old faithful" by the engineers, due to its longevity), which was ordered specifically from the factory for the purpose, with quad Chilton PPM BBC style meters. This desk was later purchased by a member, and was used for BBC broadcasts. The Studio in Wivenhoe House had meanwhile bitten the dust as early as 1978.

The station first broadcast on the 1 March 1971, on 301 meters medium wave (originally 998kHzAM) with the Dean of Students welcoming the new station to the airwaves. Programming rapidly changed from a mix of spoken word and music, to mainly music Breakfast shows were a part of broadcasting from the first day, but moved several hours earlier after a few years. The late afternoon show was called "5ive 2wo" from 5 pm to 7 pm. Specialty shows followed often with a half hour foreign educational program from places like ORTF (France) and NHK (Japan). Other specialty programming included Folk, Rock, Blues, and a Country show.

A famous late night request show called at the time "Cancer - the show that grows on you". Reports from the 5th birthday programme indicate that it was very popular.

News was also a significant part of URE for the first few years, as at most campus radio stations, and was a part of the license mandate. Copyright was a major issue, and so URE, along with several other stations at Sussex, York, Loughborough, Brunel, Surrey, and Swansea formed the National Association of Student Broadcasting. NASB as it became known negotiated with the copyright agencies for reduced copyright fees for stations by central administration, and negotiated to try to obtain news feeds for stations, since most relied on getting articles from newspapers and transcriptions of radio news. Unfortunately at that time the cost of providing feeds by telex was prohibitively expensive. As a result, Reuters worked with NASB and URE to find a way to provide news info.

The union were very supportive of the station in the first few decades, and paid for outside broadcast lines to the Union Bar, Square 4 Coffee Shop, and Ball Room or Dance Hall (in the basement of the union building), plus the newly built Lecture Theatre Block (LTBs). Here the university again put in considerable resources to the station, and built 4 dedicated studios for URE in LTB6, on the balcony overlooking the largest lecture theatre block. The idea was that URE would provide commentary for important speakers, and the union hustings from here. These were intensively used at the time, and two decades later still provided good service two or three times a year, including when Desmond Tutu visited the university in 1991. They are last believed to have hosted a URE broadcast for the union hustings in 1996, but are still in existence, and when tested in 2007 these dusty and unused studios were found to be still serviceable and connected to the main studio complex (now consisting of just one room).

=== Early transmission systems ===
Before the official opening, some programmes were broadcast on a "test oscillator" to show the practicality of the service. These broadcasts, which were of very low power, were not strictly legal.

In order to obtain a British Post Office license for the official opening, strict regulations had to be met. Because no budget was available, all of the work had to be done with minimum expenditure. An Amateur Radio KW "Vanguard" transmitter was modified by John Rabson to operate at 998 kHz, using a crystal-controlled exciter made by Robin Gape to replace the original Geloso VFO. Since the transmitter frequency was fixed, the large tuning dial was removed. An active filter was built into the Vanguard's modulator by Rick Jenkins, to avoid exceeding the allotted bandwidth.

Because of a stringent Post Office requirement to limit field strength at the campus boundary to 100 microvolts per metre, and the presence of a strong signal on an adjacent channel, the transmitter could not be simply coupled to a single, central antenna. A scheme was devised to use individual "infinitesimal" passive loop antennae in each residential tower, fed by coaxial cable and carefully phased in pairs to cancel the external field. The coaxial cable had to be carefully laid out to produce the required accuracy of phasing, and splitting transformers were used to reduce power loss. The antennae were in protected ducts inside the residential buildings, and their frames were lightly built of hardboard and spruce. Since the splitting transformers were in underground ducts, they were housed in robust die-cast boxes. Despite the crudity of its construction, this system produced a strong signal of about 10mV/metre inside the residential towers, while still meeting the requirement for a negligible signal at the campus boundary. Test equipment to confirm its correct operation, including portable field-strength meters and their calibration gear, was improvised. Subsequent Post Office testing with professional equipment confirmed that the system met its goals.

This original system was on its last legs by 1982. The Students' Union accordingly paid for a full new installation of a new "active" induction loop system, with power for loop amplifiers supplied down the coax along which came the RF supply. This was built over the summer of 1982 as the first installation by Wireless Workshop - a company formed by students from University Radio Falmer who at the time only built transmitters for university radio in the UK. At the time the chance was taken to switch to 999 kHz AM, the new UK standard. There was a separate coax supply to each tower, with a loop every three floors. There were active amplifiers under the North Towers causeway. This new system worked very well until 1990, when a blown fuse in a power amp under the causeway resulted in Tawney and William Morris being off air for 9 months. Considerable ingenuity by engineers in reaching the fuse - in the sub-basement and abandoned boiler rooms under Tawney - eventually resulted in a fix. The opportunity was taken in 1990 to add induction loops to the Wolfson Court hall of residence, which had previously only received some radiation from Keynes.

This new system allowed a "fudge", considering both studios were now constructed for self-op operation: the campus now had two transmission networks. Accordingly, the new transmitters were set up so that Studio A could serve 999 kHz with a music service (called the URE301 service, complete with sung jingles), as this used the new transmitter with much better audio processing and modulation, and speech on 1602 kHz (with a formal Home Service style) using the old 1971 transmitter, but again this 1602 service bit the dust a few years later, following the mid-80s station collapse, although it took until 1991 for the then programme controller to notify the authorities that this frequency was no longer required. By then the few remains of the 1602 transmitter were in a filing cabinet in the corridor linking the studios.

The newly installed 999 kHz induction loop network was however much weaker than the original transmitter - 1 watt as opposed to the original 50 watts - and this allowed stations like Radio Tirana (from Albania) and Deutsche Welle (from Grigoriopol) a pretty much perfect interference pattern that silenced the station unless received close to an induction loop (located on each third floor of the towers). Accordingly, in 1983 URE applied to the Home Office to move to the pretty much clear and unoccupied channel of 319 meters (963 kHz). The unauthorised broadcaster Radio Caroline had the same idea and also promptly did so too. Because it was anchored just off the coast of Frinton-on-Sea (just a few miles from URE) it pretty much decimated any reception for the station. URE moved back to 999 kHz, and took 1602 kHz transmission off air at the same time.

=== New constitution ===
The debacle sparked some internal disputes within the station, which caused doubt within the Students Union as to whether they could continue to allow URE to run without tight control of the output: in the resulting argument (from URE committee meeting minutes in 1984) URE's management took the station off air for the latter part of 1984. The dispute was only resolved when URE agreed to relinquish its office, in return for the Union to agree to abide by acknowledging URE's autonomy and a management structure decided by internal voting by the stations members, who were deemed to be "anyone enrolled in the university, its staff, or anyone they deemed a fit member of the radio station". (URE constitution 1987). This constitution worked by having a committee of a Station Manager and Programme Controller on equal footing, plus a head of News, Engineering, Publicity, Treasurer, Secretary, and Record Librarian. All had a vote in committee decisions, and the union was relegated to a position at which the station would put in its request for a budget at the end of the year, and maintain its own finances. In 1988 in a formal referendum URE members voted to accept advertising for the first time, but turned down any suggestion to playlist the station. At the time URE had extensive publicity, including a programme schedule that was produced and sent to each flat on campus every two weeks with a name on the pun of Radio Times (Radio Tubes, Radio Tiles, Radio Tynes etc.): by 1988 the name Radio Crimes had stuck - it was printed fortnightly until 1996, with a wider circulation than any SU publication.

The new constitution reinvigorated the station and dramatically changed the output: it was the start of a long period of steady growth that lasted nearly two decades. While in 1986 the station didn't broadcast in Freshers week, by 1987 the importance of welcoming new students (and indirectly, encouraging them to listen to URE) was recognised, and in 1987 the programme controller (on air 10 amnoon) and Station Manager (on air 4 pm – 6 pm) managed a week of broadcasting, with specialist programming in the evening. This encouraged considerable sign-up of new presenters, and by the second week of term there was full programming throughout weekdays. By the winter, there was even a Saturday breakfast show. In the spring the station started taking Independent Radio News on the hour - by a tuner that provided Essex Radio as a fader on the desk. This was initially planned as just a way to taking news (IRN), but by the summer it had turned into a way to fill "dead air" - previously the station just broadcast silence when there was no presenter in the one on air studio.

By 1988 there was full daytime programming in Freshers Week for the first time and over 200 new DJs signed up: that winter URE achieved full 24-hour programming in the last week of term, a new record. At the same time the tower blocks moved over from having an internal phone system (known as "Towers Internal Telephone System" or TITS), on which URE used the extension 158, to a Private Internal Phone System. There were from the mid 70s many jocular jingles on the theme of URE being on "TITS 158". URE adopted a new extension in 1988, of 2267, which exists to this day, however that gave rise to the infamous "PITS" switch, or "Phone Internal Telephone System". This, on the Magnetic Tapes desk until it was replaced, gave the presenter output plus music through the speakers in the studio, without a cutout if the microphone was on air. Very soon the advantage of this switch - which meant the music carried on, even while the presenter was on air, became apparent: it became known as the PITS or "Party in the Studio" Switch.

URE celebrated its 18th birthday in 1989. Many Alumni were invited back to make programmes. By 1989 there was a waiting list of over 20 new presenters, and the Christmas "all-nighters" presentation had become a fixture. A criticism of this period was that there was always a drive to encourage new presenters to sign up - and maintain the music output, to keep the station on air all the time, at an expense of complex talk programmes. To counter this then programme controller introduced a once a week talk programme called "Tower to Tower"; the name was a direct copy of University Radio Falmer's "Slope to Slope", although the format was new: with three minutes of the news of university that week, six minutes of UK news, a five-minute what's on guide, an interview with a sabbatical officer, a five-minute package of an event effecting students, a band review, film review, and the headlines again, it was the quickest way to teach a junior news team the basics of news, and maintain an entertaining programme. The format was in turn copied by UKC Radio's "College to College" and even Wired! at Goldsmiths "Tower to College", as one of the longest living speech formats on UK Student Radio. It was nominated for awards by the Student Radio Association (SRA) in 1996. Derivations of the format still exist on air today.

In 1989 URE started taking Capital Radio as its overnight "sustaining" service, when it couldn't provide output. This has been reported to be an innovative piece of programming. At the time Capital was by far the most dominant ILR station in the UK, with highly innovative programming. However, in North Essex, Capital was out of range except for people with a very expensive directional aerial. URE possessed this - and relayed Capital overnight, and for early breakfast until 8 am: this considerably drove its listenership, although it took a knock in 1990 when URE's main competition, BBC Radio 1, started broadcasting in FM - previously BBC Radio 1 had been at 1053 & 1089 kHz AM, and for some students switching from FM to AM and back was too complicated, as other Medium Wave stations later also found. Ironically, to celebrate the launch of Radio 1 in FM, Radio 1 toured East Anglia by Helicopter and touched down at the Wivenhoe Park campus: alas, they did so in the middle of the Easter Holidays, and the only people to greet them were members of URE.

However the Student Union had become wary of the newly resurgent URE. In 1991 a band of Sabbatical Officers, aware that the main players in URE stood for elections - using it as a platform for their own agendas - demanded cutbacks in URE: the most severe being a move from URE's coveted studio complex above square three to a couple of rooms at the back of the union corridor. However, with URE having by far the most members of any part of the SU, and with far more members actively involved than any other outlet, it was forced to back down in 1992, and fully fund URE, while abiding by its autonomous constitution.

== Later history ==
The move in studio locations marked a neat change in URE's history. It cost Essex University Students' Union over 20,000 pounds to move the URE studios up the union corridor from their favoured positions above the stairs, to the present position at the end of the union corridor. The move bought a new Air2000 broadcast desk which is in use to this day, plus what at the time was state of the art equipment: Sonifex broadcast cartridges and twin CD vari-speed players.

Part of the cost went towards wiring up the new Square three coffee bar with URE speakers. This was the original food bar, before the Hexagon was built, however with the advent of the Square four coffee bar in 1980 it was closed and used as a lecture room. The Square Four coffee bar was wired with twin speakers in the ceiling, a home built amp, an outside broadcast socket for URE's totally unique "network" sockets. By 1989 a new coffee bar was mooted - the old Square 3 rooms: in a weekend long operation after the coffee bar was finished by estates, URE members put speakers over the ceiling tiles, and then ran a single screened cable under the podia (an operation involving a member walking 20 feet (6.3m) above the ground on a single cable tray), although the speakers were later cut into ceiling tiles, and then run through a single 100 volt transformer. The Square three coffee bar later closed, but in 2006 became what is now called Food on Three, still with the student radio station on speakers in the ceiling. The Square Four coffee bar shut in 1989, and became tutorial rooms, but reopened as SXPress in 2000, however no attempt has been made to put speakers back here, despite the permanent landline.

By 1996 the station was the first student radio station to have a digital playout system - Myriad. By 1997 the station was becoming so important to campus life that it was clear that the SU would have to pay for a permanent staff member: this was highly successful, and a permanent Station Manager brought in almost more advertising than the station cost. In 1998 the station started Freely Radiating on 1404 kHz using LPAM, an AM frequency in a tightly defined area restricted by the terms of the licence to the university campus. In the case of URE this was particularly restrictive, as URE was one of the "test beds" of the first four LPAM AM licences issued by the Radio Authority. URE was of note as at the time it was one of the leading campus radio stations, and with this experimental new licence the authorities were particularly cautious about who should have a licence. URE proved that it could act responsibly, and it led the way by which other student radio stations gained LPAM.

Although designed just for campus, in daytime reception was now possible throughout Colchester, however this could not be advertised under the terms of the licence. This transmitter - again, by Wireless Workshop - was initially sited by Bertram Russell tower. This, on a hill by water, was one of the best possible AM transmission sites in Essex. The 1602 kHz LPAM mast had to be moved in 2003 to accommodate new student residences, and was sited behind the Sports Hall. Although in the tradition of URE, 999 kHz on induction loops was maintained as backup. URE closed 999 kHz in 2001 due to the extra costs of two AM licences.

By 1997 month-long FM broadcasts became the norm, and these were permitted to be heard by an audience beyond the campus. 20 watts with a mast on the roof of the SU building gave good coverage over North Essex. It gave virtual 24-hour output: these acted as a good advert for the student union, and also broadcast the Sabbatical election hustings, encouraging thousands to vote. URE broadcast in FM from 30 Sep – 27 Oct 1997 (during which it also maintained a split service daytime 1404 AM output, and had separate jingles for 999 kHz AM. Medium Wave was known as the "Gold" service, FM was "hot hits".) There were subsequent FM broadcasts from 6 October to 2 November 1998, from 5 October to 1 November 1999, and from 31 January to 27 February 2005.

In 2003 the Students' Union suspended the constitution. This was considered by many to be a devastating blow, and there was much criticism at SU meetings. Instead of URE's management for the following year being voted on by the members who had seen how hard they had worked that year, there was instead to be just one Station Manager, and no other management staff. This was a paid Sabbatical position voted by all SU members, and it also encompassed "Rabbit", the SU newspaper. The post became a political position, and with little day to day care, URE collapsed and shut down virtually overnight.

A massive setback for URE again was the collapse in the summer of 2004 of SBN - the Student Broadcast Network - as the sustaining service. It provided URE with specialist shows and student-orientated news and information via satellite. SBN paid stations for taking syndicated advertising and sponsored shows, which enabled them to buy transmitting and studio equipment. However, in July 2004, SBN's parent company Campus Media ceased its student radio operation at just one weeks notice. URE suffered badly from this cutback, both in loss of revenue, and from the loss of output on air that could not be supplied from automated computer playlists from the studios.

The SU took back the sole production studios in 2006, at just one weeks notice. It turned them into offices for non-sabbatical officers, which mean the station could not now produce anything off-air, from debates to trails. The station now just has one room, with the Alice Air 2000 broadcast desk.

At one point there was an attempt to re-brand URE as "Rabbit Radio" - moving in inline with the student newspaper, The Rabbit, this however was heavily resisted and the idea dropped. In 2003 the station was rebranded as RED by the Student Union, however a survey in 2006 showed few people at Essex University associated RED with a radio station.

URE or RED - 1404 AM still exists today, but massively truncated from its status as previously one of the most dominant radio stations, defining alternative radio listening and leading the Students' Union media outlet of the past four decades.

Information on the present day activities of URE can be found at RED - 1404 AM.

== Notable presenters ==
Several professional presenters started out on URE, including:

- Nick Margerrison, who was also Head of Music for 1996/97
- Ian Gardner, a presenter at URE around 1991-1993, particularly of "The Nite Spot"

Other notable presenters were Roy Trubshaw, Nigel Roberts and Michael Tierney.
