= Steve Doran =

Steve Doran is an English community organiser, activist and former radio DJ from Dartford, Kent. She fronted a campaign against payday lenders in the UK in conjunction with Movement For Change. She discussed the issues surrounding payday lending on BBC news, ITV news, Channel 5 News and Sky News. She met with Ed Miliband to discuss the proposed policy on payday lending.

At the 2006 Student Radio Awards held on 9 November, Doran was announced as the Gold Award winner for Best Female Presenter. On Friday 13 April 2007, Doran presented the Early Breakfast Show on BBC Radio 1, in a slot designed to showcase new talent, and as direct result of her win the previous year of the Student Radio Award. Steve became well-known on her university campus after doing 40 hours solidly on URN to raise money for Children in Need 2005. She presented the Evening Show on Tuesdays as well as The Graveyard Shift on Sundays for URN, the university student radio station.

Steve has also served as Mayoress of Dartford from 2006 to 2007, acting as consort to the Mayor, her uncle Councillor David Hammock at the age of 19. Doran was also President of the Nottingham University Debating Union during that same period. For her contribution to student life at Nottingham she was made an Honorary Life Member of the Students' Union in 2007.
