= Musu =

MUSU may refer to

- University of Melbourne Student Union, one of several student organisations at the University of Melbourne, Australia
- University of Manchester Students' Union, student organisation of the University of Manchester, England
- Middlesex University Students' Union, student organisation of Middlesex University, London, England
- Musu Dior, creator of Christian Dior perfume company.
