= Xpression FM =

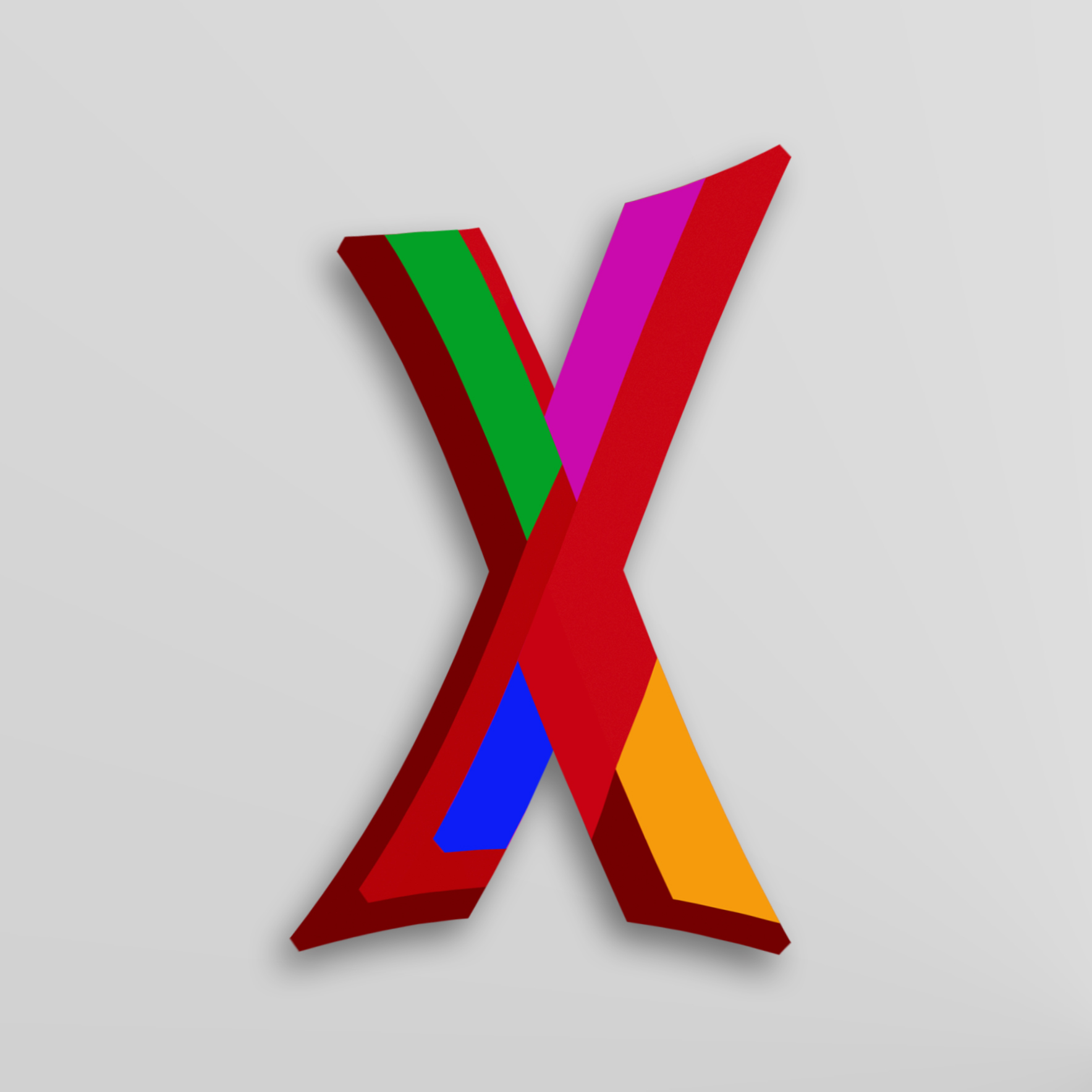
- Exeter; England
- Broadcast area: University of Exeter
- Frequency: 87.7 MHz

Programming
- Language: English
- Format: Student radio
- Affiliations: UK Student Radio Association

Ownership
- Owner: University of Exeter Students' Guild

History
- Founded: 26 February 1976
- First air date: 2001
- Former names: University Radio Exeter

Links
- Webcast: stream
- Website: xpression.fm

Xpression FM is a campus radio station for the University of Exeter, England. Formerly known as URE (University Radio Exeter), the station has been broadcasting since 1976 and is entirely run by students from the university.

== History ==
Initiated by post-graduates, University Radio Exeter began broadcasting from Devonshire House on low power AM. Hours of broadcast were originally 5pm until 10pm with BBC Radio 1 carrying as a sustaining service. In the late 1990s it was deemed that, due to remote location, URE was allowed to use a low-power FM system. URE also became part of the Student Broadcast Network. The station was renamed "Xpression FM 87.7" at the start of 2001.

University Radio Exeter was founded in 1976, under the stairs of Devonshire House on the campus of the University of Exeter. At that time, of course, the only means of broadcasting was very low power, using induction loop aerials to broadcast to Halls of residence. Initially the transmitter was installed in the studio. This meant feeding a coaxial cable, carrying the RF signal, just below ground level from Devonshire House to Lafrowda halls of residence. This probably only covered 500 people maximum but seemed to work adequately for around 6 months, until 6 months of gardeners' spade abuse had reduced the transmitter cable to shreds. A rethink resulted in the transmitters being moved to the halls of residence, with the feed from the studio to the halls using cables leased from British Telecom.

In the late 1990s the rules were changed and certain parts of the country were permitted to use a low-power FM system. As an indirect result of joining the Student Broadcast Network (SBN), money became available to convert to low-power FM. Thus, at the start of 2001, the posters for "URE 963" were taken down, and replaced with brand spanking new ones, emblazoned with the logo "Xpression FM 87.7".

In early 2009 the station stopped using XFM as an overnight sustaining service and now broadcasts from the Exeter studio 24 hours a day.

At the 2011 Student Radio Awards, Xpression FM won their first ever gold award for Best Student Radio Chart Show. This award win was followed up by the station winning gold for Best Student Radio Chart Show once more in 2012. Golds have also been won by the Sport Team in 2022 and the News Team under Tom Langley and Florence New in 2024, for the Diversity, Equality and Inclusion Award.

The Committee Over Time: Over the years, the committee structure has undergone various changes. In 2009/2010, the Head of Scripted Programming role was created to reflect the diversified content of the station. In 2011/2012, the Head of Sport position was added, following the growing interest in the Sports Team. A second Head of Marketing position was also introduced. In 2012/2013, the new Deputy Station Manager position was introduced to replace the Studio Administrator. The Deputy Station Manager deals with the administration and finances of the station. The new position also replaced the Programmes Controller as a Heads of Media Position. The second Head of Marketing position was reformed into the Head of Social Media in 2019/20 (and has since been reconstituted in to the original dual co-marketing format). In 2020/21, the two roles Head of Technology and Head of Training were formed into the one position of Head of Tech and Training.

== Xpression FM News ==
Xpression FM has its very own in-house news team, led by students James Barrell and Ryan Whitehead. They produce student-focused news in the daily bulletins which are broadcast on the hour from 10am on weekdays on the station. Alongside that, the team also produces a show bi-weekly on Mondays called 'ExeFocus' where contributors come together to discuss University stories, and stories from the local area. Past shows in the Monday slot have included: 'The Hot Seat', where interviewees have included award-winning author Anthony Horowitz and former Vice-Chancellor of the University of Exeter Sir Steve Smith; 'Limelight' ran in this role from 2019-2021, with a lighter, more magazine feel to the show. The second show of the week from the News Team, 'NewsHour', is aired on Fridays at 5pm, expanding on stories covered in the bulletins, as well as featuring exclusive interviews and longer-form reports. This show takes the form of a panel discussion, where student contributors present their opinions on the breaking stories from around the country and the world. The team has won many awards at the University of Exeter's X Media Awards throughout the years for their commitment and subject coverage.

The Team cover breaking news events as they pop up throughout the year as well, with overnight coverage of the 2019 General Election and the 2026 US Midterm Election being notable recent highlights. On University matters, the station covers the annual Guild Elections, with a week of coverage dedicated to interviews, debates and the vote counts and announcements.

The Xpression FM news team have had many successful broadcast journalists as part of their team. These include the BBC's Ruth Lovell and Dan O'Brien, as well as Jon Kay.

== Xpression FM Sport ==
Xpression FM also has its own team dedicated to sport. They air one show a week covering all of the major global sports news. This is Tuesday Night Sport (often referred to as TNS), aired from 7 pm to 9 pm on a Tuesday evening.

Headed by George Mackenzie and Alexander George William Kerr, the sports team can regularly be found occupying a 'Soccer Saturday' style vibe to Tuesday Night Sport, but there are also regular commentaries of Exeter City F.C, Exeter Chiefs and BUCS matches involving the University team, and with press passes to some of the highest level sport in the city in both football and rugby union. In 2026, the team began live broadcasting of Exeter City Women F.C. marking a major development in the team's output.

XpressionFM former heads of sports (respectively), Tom Picillo (2021/2022) and Mikhail Skhlover (2022/2023) won the award for the best sports programming for their commentary on the promotion of Exeter City FC to EFL League One at the SRA Awards in 2022.

== Xpression FM Music ==
The Music Team is hosted by Andrea Ismalaj and Robin Wamsteker and are closely linked to the Student Radio Association, they also often collaborate with student musicians to hear what the community can offer musically. They often find themselves invited to festivals to report on the songs and artists there. The team have a show from 6-8pm on Thursdays where a panel of guests discuss their bops and flops from the week just gone, and play some of the chosen songs from the Heads of Music and the team behind them. The Music Team are also in charge of organising the Student Radio Chart Show once a year, as well as 24 hours live that is also held annually for charity.

== Xpression FM Drama ==
Running a weekly show on Wednesdays, as well as featuring their termly shows on the radio station. Each of these shows tend to be written by students, produced by students, directed by students, and starring students - a real showcase. There is always something brewing in the studio with the drama team. Led by Henry White and Freya Dingley, their live drama performances and showcases are a spectacle to tune into. The Drama Team also conduct interviews of different student theatre production companies, including Theatre with Teeth.

== Present day ==
Xpression broadcasts live from Devonshire House utilising three studios for simultaneous presentation, production and training. The redevelopment of Devonshire House led to a studio move for Xpression FM. Instead of broadcasting from underneath Devonshire House the studios are situated at the back of the building. The new studios include two live-to-air studios, a third (larger) studio for recording live sessions and group projects, a newsroom, a technology hub and a CD wall.

The station can be heard via a webcast (provided by Broadcast Radio), through iTunes radio, Spotify and Mixcloud.

The Current Committee is made up of 18 students, and headed up by Station Manager, Will Jones; Deputy Station Manager, Tegenn Jefferey; and Programmes Controller, Matas Losevicius.

Each content team has their own heads; Music: Andrea Ismalaj and Robin Wamsteker; News: James Barrell and Ryan Whitehead; Drama: Henry White and Freya Dingley; Sport: George Mackenzie and Alexander George William Kerr.

Additionally, They are also joined by Head of Marketing, Rosie Woolfe; Head of Station Sound, Freddie Lambert; Head of Technical Operations, Matthew Orton; Head of Events, Fynn Rose; Networking and Outreach Officer, Shreeya Saxena; Head of Training, Adriaen Jastrzebski and Welfare Secretary, Charlotte Cox.

The Committee contains a mixture of students, from second year through to PHD, and is elected from a pool of candidates in the second term of every year.

== Awards and nominations ==
=== Student Radio Awards ===
Year	Award	Category	Entry Title
2008	Silver	Best Male Presenter	Ben Holt
2009	Shortlisted	Best Scripted Programming	"The Garden" (Written by Becca Attfield)
2009	Shortlisted	Best Marketing and Station Sound	Xpression FM
2009	Silver	Best Entertainment Programme	The Sunday Lunchtime Show with Stephen and David Williams
2010	Shortlisted	Best Journalistic Programming	Is There A Future For Exelets?
2011	Gold	Best Student Radio Chart Show	
2012	Silver	Best Live Event or Outside Broadcast	The Forum Opening
2012	Gold	Best Student Radio Chart Show	
2013	Shortlisted	Best Marketing and Station Sound	Xpression FM
2013	Silver	Best Entertainment Programme	Wake and Bake with Gareth Jones and Laurence Foreman
2015	Bronze	Best Interview	Mental Health Issues in Sport
2015	Bronze	Best Sports Programming	Boxing Varsity ’14
2021	Silver	Station Marketing	Xpression Marketing 2020-21
2021	Silver	Best Multiplatform Initiative, Best Event	Love Is Blind on XpressionFM
2022	Silver	Diversity, Equality & Inclusion Award	The Music Show
2022	Gold	Best Sports Programming	Grecian Glory - Exeter City's Promotion
2024	Gold	Diversity, Equality & Inclusion Award	Xpression FM News
2025	Bronze	Best Event Programming	BFS Future Leader Summit

== Alumni ==
- BBC's Jon Kay
- Dr Chair Michael "Mikey" Peake
- Sky Sports F1 Presenter Ted Kravitz
- Smooth Radio Presenter Emma B
- Sports Presenter Rob Walker
- Channel 5 Royal Correspondent Simon Vigar
- Simon Clark, a Climate Change Educator and Youtuber.
