= RamAir =

- England
- Broadcast area: Internet

Programming
- Format: Pop, Indie and Rock
- Affiliations: Student Radio Association

Ownership
- Owner: University of Bradford Union

History
- First air date: 1 October 1980

RamAir is a radio station run by the Students Union at the University of Bradford, England. It broadcasts locally on 1,350 MHz AM and also online through its web site. The name comes from the old students union logo of a ram.

== History ==
The station was founded in 1980, and operates from two studios in the university's student union building. The station is run entirely by student volunteers, who, as well as presenting shows, also undertake the technical aspects. Up until the mid-1990s, RamAir broadcast to students via a series of induction loops installed throughout the student halls. In conjunction with SBN, RamAir had a Low Power AM (LPAM) Radica transmitter, affectionately known as "Doris", installed in the car park of the former Shearbridge Halls, which broadcast on 1350AM at a max power of 1 watt.

Previously the station carried the syndicated Student Broadcast Network (SBN) when no own-content was being broadcast - this was changed in 2004.

== Achievements ==
It was the first student radio station to broadcast legally on FM via a Restricted Service Licence.

As of September 2007, it was the first student radio station to be specifically made available through the respective Wii and PlayStation 3 browsers. When analogue cable television was commonplace, the station was broadcast on 98FM across the region to listeners with a cable feed (No subscription required). RamAir occasionally broadcasts across the city of Bradford on an FM RSL (Restricted Service Licence), usually on 102FM from a transmitter located on top of the university's JB Priestley library.

On 26 April 2006, Phill Jupitus broadcast his BBC 6 Music breakfast show from the station, and interviewed Billy Bragg who had played a concert at the university the previous evening.

At the end of March 2009, RamAir broadcast their own take on Big Brother: a radio reality show called The Lockdown. Eight students from the University of Bradford were locked in the studios for 48 hours while a temporary studio controlled what they and listeners heard.

As part of a campaign to raise £40,000 for new studio equipment for the move into the refurbished "Student Central" building, the comedian Russell Howard performed for staff, students and the public during August 2010 with ticket sale money going to the RamAid appeal. This was repeated in December 2011 with Russell Kane headlining.
