= Student Broadcast Network =

The Student Broadcast Network or SBN was a company that provided a sustaining service, news and advertising for student radio stations in the United Kingdom.

It provided syndicated music based programmes and an hourly news service across the UK via satellite. Stations received money in return for broadcasting SBN's content and advertising. In 2004, SBN was closed by its parent company Campus Media, leaving many student stations with large gaps in their budgets.

== Subscriber Stations ==
- Radio Airthrey – University of Stirling.
- B1000 – Brunel University, west London.
- Bailrigg FM – Lancaster University.
- C4 Radio – Christ Church College, Canterbury.
- CUR1350 – University of Cambridge.
- Demon FM – De Montfort University, Leicester.
- EAR FM – London Guildhall University
- FCT FM – Farnborough College of Technology
- GCR (formerly GU2, now Stag Radio) – University of Surrey.
- Imperial College Radio – Imperial College, London.
- Insanity 1287AM – Royal Holloway, London.
- Jam 1575 – University of Hull.
- Junction11 – University of Reading.
- Loughborough Campus Radio – Loughborough University.
- Radio Glen (now SURGE 1287AM) – University of Southampton.
- Ramair – University of Bradford.
- Solar 1287 – St Helens College.
- Subcity Radio – University of Glasgow.
- UKC Radio – University of Kent.
- URE (now Red AM 1404) – University of Essex.
- URE – University of Exeter.
- University Radio Nottingham – University of Nottingham.
- University Radio York – University of York.
- Xtreme Radio – University of Wales, Swansea.
- 1449AM URB – University of Bath

== Presenters: Who did what? ==
- Breakfast – Alison Hulme, Benedict Smith, Neil Grayson, Phil Smith, Duncan Wilson.
- Weekend Breakfast – Antman (Ant McGinley), Annie Macmanus, Edward Adoo, Emma Scrafton.
- Afternoons – Steve Harris, Mark Manchester, Samanthi.
- Weekend Afternoons – Jim Coulson.
- Late Show – Craig Pilling, Duncan Wilson.
- The Presence – P (Pinal Gandhi).
- News – Steve Austins, John Handelaar, Soraya Moeng, Jenny Monaghan, Tim Metcalfe.
- Student Radio Chart Show – Keni Barwick, Mark Manchester, Neil Grayson, Duncan Wilson.

== Presenters: Where are they now? ==
- Alison Hulme is now a writer and academic, formerly on Kiss 100.
- Mark Manchester is a continuity announcer for ITV1.
- Benedict Smith now hosts a breakfast show for KMFM.
- Antman works on a cruise ship.
- Neil Grayson is the evening show presenter at Dubai 92.
- Craig Pilling is a continuity announcer for Comedy Central (UK & Ireland).
- Steve Harris works for BBC Solent.
- Emma Scrafton now produces Frank Skinner for Absolute Radio
- Samanthi hosts The Hub on ITV's "This Morning"
- Jim Coulson works as 2BR's breakfast presenter in Burnley.
- Annie Macmanus is at BBC Radio 1, known as 'Annie Mac'.
- Edward Adoo appears on the BBC's 5 Live, and has worked as a continuity announcer.
- Phil Smith now produces Steve Lamacq for BBC Radio 6 Music
- Soraya Moeng went to work in Print media as a journalist.
- John Handelaar is now based in the Republic of Ireland.
- Steve Austins went to BBC Wales.
- Duncan Wilson moved to New Zealand and works as a TV/radio producer and author. In 2015, he became the first person to cycle the country's coastline. In 2019, he published his first book 'The Big Loop', detailing his adventure.
- Pinal Gandhi is now the Co-founder & Chief Commercial Officer of Big Data Partnership.
