= CFTR (disambiguation) =

CFTR (cystic fibrosis transmembrane conductance regulator) is a membrane protein and chloride channel in vertebrates.

CFTR may also refer to:

- CFTR (AM), a Canadian radio station serving the Greater Toronto Area
- Citizens for the Republic (CFTR), an American political action committee
- UTB Centre for Transport Research (CfTR), a research group at the University of Technology Brunei
- G-CFTR, CAA registration for a sailplane owned by the Nottingham University Gliding Club
