= Jeremy Corbyn: Accidental Hero =

Book by W Stephen Gilbert

- Author: W Stephen Gilbert
- Language: English
- Published: London
- Publisher: Eyewear Publishing
- Publication date: 2015
- Publication place: United Kingdom
- Pages: 160
- ISBN: 9781908998897

Jeremy Corbyn: Accidental Hero is a 2015 book by British writer W Stephen Gilbert, published by Eyewear Publishing.

== Synopsis ==
Jeremy Corbyn: Accidental Hero is an analysis of the rise of long-serving backbench MP Jeremy Corbyn to the leadership of the opposition Labour Party. The book evaluates Corbyn's life and career and future as Labour leader. A second edition, containing 23 new pages of text, was published in April 2016.

== Reception ==
In The Mancunion, Yasmin Mannan described the book as "the most fashionable I've ever read" and noted that, despite her view prior to reading it that the book was published too soon, it was an informative read. In the Oxford Left Review, Merryn Williams wrote that Accidental Hero was "longer, more scholarly and more thoughtful" than other works on Corbyn to date. In the Morning Star, John Green praised the work as a "highly readable and comprehensible introduction to the man and his politics" and commended the "easy and witty style".
