= Nick Margerrison =

British radio presenter and musician (born 1977)

Nick Margerrison (born 1977) is a radio presenter and musician who used to present the weekend overnight show on LBC 97.3. Currently he is known for fronting the band 'Chimps of the Future'.

== Early career ==
Nick Margerrison went to the University of Essex where he studied English literature. It was there he started his career in radio at University Radio Essex where he rose ultimately to the position of Station Manager and helped to secure the station's first FM Radio licence, albeit a short term 'restricted service licence'. This coincided with University Radio Essex being granted a low-power AM licence which was awarded on a trial basis to the station ahead of their adoption in the future on other student radio and hospital radio stations. From there he went on to work professionally in local radio starting on Oak FM in Loughborough and moving on to The Bay in Lancaster.

== Hallam FM ==
He joined Hallam FM in South Yorkshire in April 2001 and remained there until May 2007. In that time he presented the overnight show and the afternoon show before finally taking over the late night phone in slot in 2003. Nick at Night was a topical late night talk show that regularly received successful RAJAR listening figures.

Nick at Night deviated from traditional radio phone-ins in that it operated an almost exclusive "no-screening" policy on callers. Thus a wide variety of often controversial viewpoints were given air-time. Margerrison constantly challenged callers to reconsider their viewpoints, and offered his own thoughts on the subjects of the day.

== Kerrang! 105.2 ==
On 23 October 2007 he was appointed as the late night presenter for Kerrang! 105.2 radio in place of Tim Shaw who moved to present the station's breakfast show. The Kerrang! radio show was called The Night Before and he presented it with a co-host, Amy Jones. His producer, Alex Baker, also had a very significant on air role. The show had a different structure to his previous show Nick at Night in that it contained music and interviews, but it followed the same "no-screening" policy on callers.

A typical The Night Before interviewee came from a fringe perspective. Examples include, David Icke, Ivan Stang, Alex Jones, Bret Hart, Alan Moore, Rodney Orpheus, and Peter H. Gilmore.

On 23 June 2009, Kerrang! Radio stated in an e-mail to 'Freq Club' members that Margerrison would be leaving the station "we can’t escape the fact that the economy at the moment is screwed and like every other business we have had to make some tough decisions".

== Controversial TV ==
Margerrison has filmed two series of the chat show called 'Esoteria' for Controversial TV, which broadcasts on Sky channel 200. Its main focus was the more eccentric guests that had featured on the Kerrang Radio show.

== LBC 97.3 ==
He presents the overnight show on London speech station LBC 97.3 from 10 September 2009, taking over from Anthony Davis. who moved to weeknights.

As of 23 March 2012, Nick has been dropped from the schedule of LBC 97.3 in an announcement made by James Rea, LBC Controller.

He could then be heard presenting evenings on the Bay in North Lancs & South Cumbria. As is the host of TV programme LateNightLive.

== Podcasting ==
Nick is currently working at TopMedTalk from their studios in West London. This is a highly specialised narrow-casting project targeted at an international audience of medical professionals. Nick also has his own podcasts (the Cult of Nick) which sees Nick returning to his broadcasting roots and featuring an eclectic array of guests and topics.

== Religious beliefs ==
Nick Margerrison is an ordained and practising Discordian (fifth Pope of the High Church) but usually professes to be an atheist.
