= Impact (student magazine) =

Student magazine of the University of Nottingham

Impact Magazine
- Editor-in-Chief: Grace Morrell
- Categories: News, Sport, Lifestyle, Features, Entertainment, Reviews, Podcasts
- Frequency: Quarterly
- Circulation: 4,000
- Publisher: University of Nottingham Students' Union
- Founded: 1939 (The Gong)
- Country: United Kingdom
- Language: English
- Website: impactnottingham.com

Impact Magazine is the official student magazine of the University of Nottingham. It has been published in various forms and under various names since 1939. Run on a voluntary basis using funds from the Students' Union, the magazine is available free to students. Impact also publishes a website, which has been online since 8 January 2006, and an app, which was launched in 2016.

== Awards ==
Impact journalist Nicola Byrom was designated Mind's Student Journalist of the Year 2009 for her "outstanding contribution to mental health awareness".

Impact Magazine has also won several awards at the annual Guardian Student Media Awards. It won "Student Magazine of the Year" in 2001 and was runner-up in this category in 2005 and 2007. It was also runner-up in the category for "Student Publication Design of the Year" for the 2006 awards. In 2014, Impact won The Guardian's Best Website award. In 2017, the magazine won Best Magazine Design at the national Student Publication Awards.

Writers for the magazine have also won individual awards, including Amy Franks for "Student columnist of the year" and Nosheen Asghar for "Student diversity writer of the year" in 2002, and Paul Robins for "Sports Writer of the Year" in 2004. The Guardian panel in 2001 described Impact as having "great design and great articles that brilliantly reflected its student readership but could have been a real stand-alone magazine".

== History ==
The Gong, launched in 1895 was the University of Nottingham's first student-led publication. It published students’ own stories, poems and literary reviews. The Gong continued for decades alongside its news-based rival, The Gongster, which was launched in 1939 and after several image changes, became known as Impact. The paper was criticised for being "too serious and stodgy".

The publication also faced difficulties when World War II broke out, resulting in a print reduction as the United Kingdom encountered a paper shortage. In 1941, Gongster was suspended throughout the summer months due to a lack of funding, given the restrictions imposed on all societies by the Student's Union.

As the paper hit the 1980s, it was decided that Gongster required a change and soon became Bias. The new name lasted only five years before it changed to Impact.

Impact subsequently changed into a magazine, which remains in the same format with an ever increasing number of pages.

Impact released its 200th issue on 30 November 2009.

== Alumni ==
Impact's most notable alumni include:

- Jeff Randall, Editor-at-Large of The Daily Telegraph and presenter of Jeff Randall Live on Sky News. Jeff was also BBC Political Editor from 2001 to 2005.
- Jeremy Browne (previous Editor), Liberal Democrat Member of Parliament for Taunton Deane.
