= University Radio Nottingham =

Student radio station at the University of Nottingham

Coordinates: 52°56′16.7″N 1°11′39.4″W

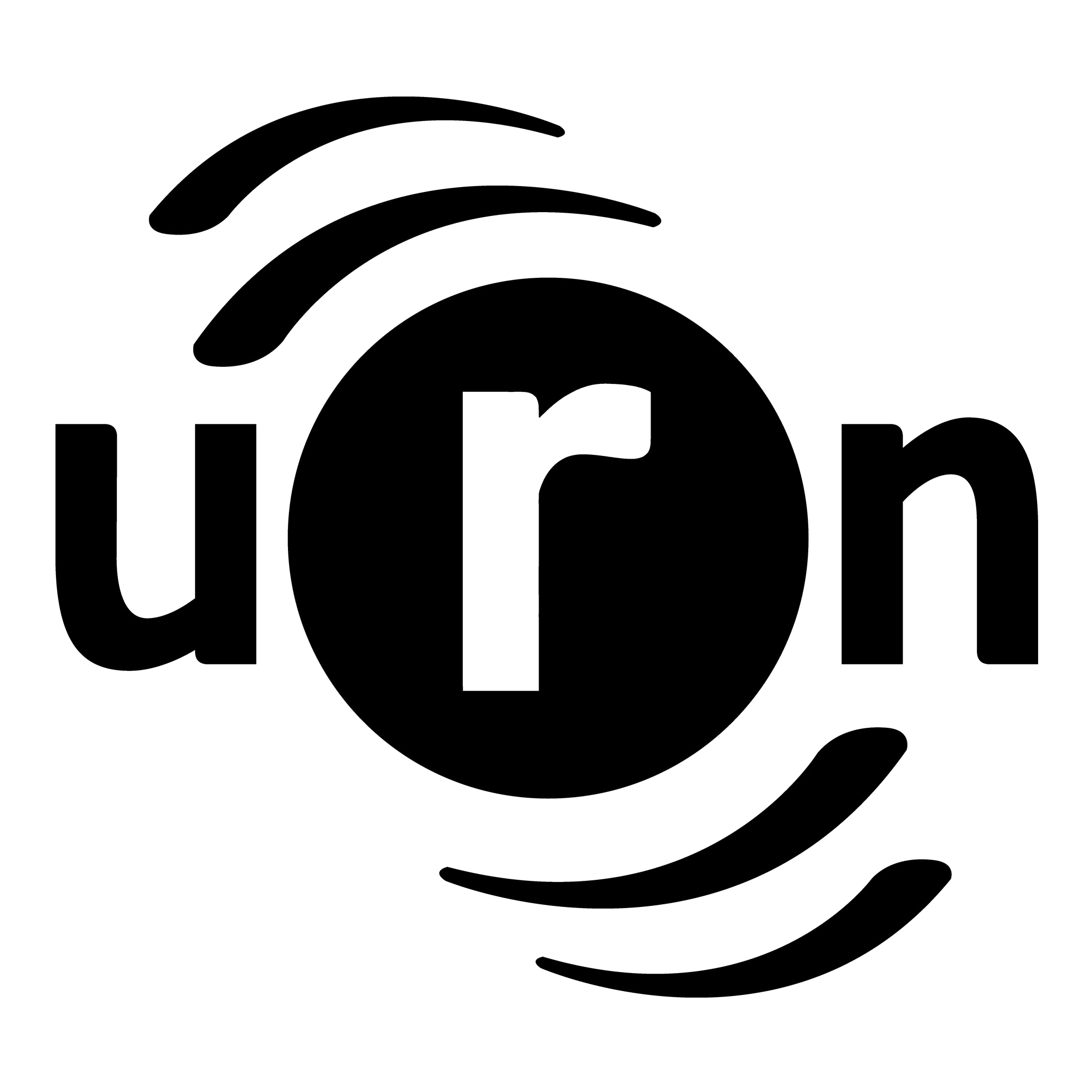
- Nottingham; England
- Broadcast area: University of Nottingham
- Frequency: https://urn1350.co.uk/

Programming
- Language: English
- Format: Contemporary
- Network: Student Broadcast Network
- Affiliations: Student Radio Association

Ownership
- Owner: University of Nottingham Students' Union

History
- First air date: November 1979

Links
- Website: URN

.

University Radio Nottingham is the university radio station of the University of Nottingham, England, where it is part of the university's students' union. During term-time it broadcasts locally on University Park Campus on 1350 AM and worldwide via its website. It is run by student volunteers from the University of Nottingham.

== History ==
URN was established from the university's Radio Broadcasting Club, who, in the late 1970s had an hour's slot on BBC Radio Nottingham. The station set up its first studio in the Cherry Tree buildings in 1978 and "University Radio Nottingham" started broadcasting to Hugh Stewart Hall and Cripps Hall of residence on 963kHz (312m) in November 1979. Additional induction loops were set up over the next few years in other halls on campus. A fifth induction loop was installed on Sutton Bonington Campus in 1990, financed by their Guild.

In 1997, URN became one of the first radio stations to broadcast on the internet using the MP3 format. The station started broadcasting in the Ogg Vorbis format in 2002.

The station was one of the first to broadcast using an LPAM long-term restricted service licence to the whole of University Park on 1350AM in 2001.

In 2004, URN moved into new purpose build studios located in the university's Portland Building. This was due to the demolition of the Cherry Tree buildings in 2003.

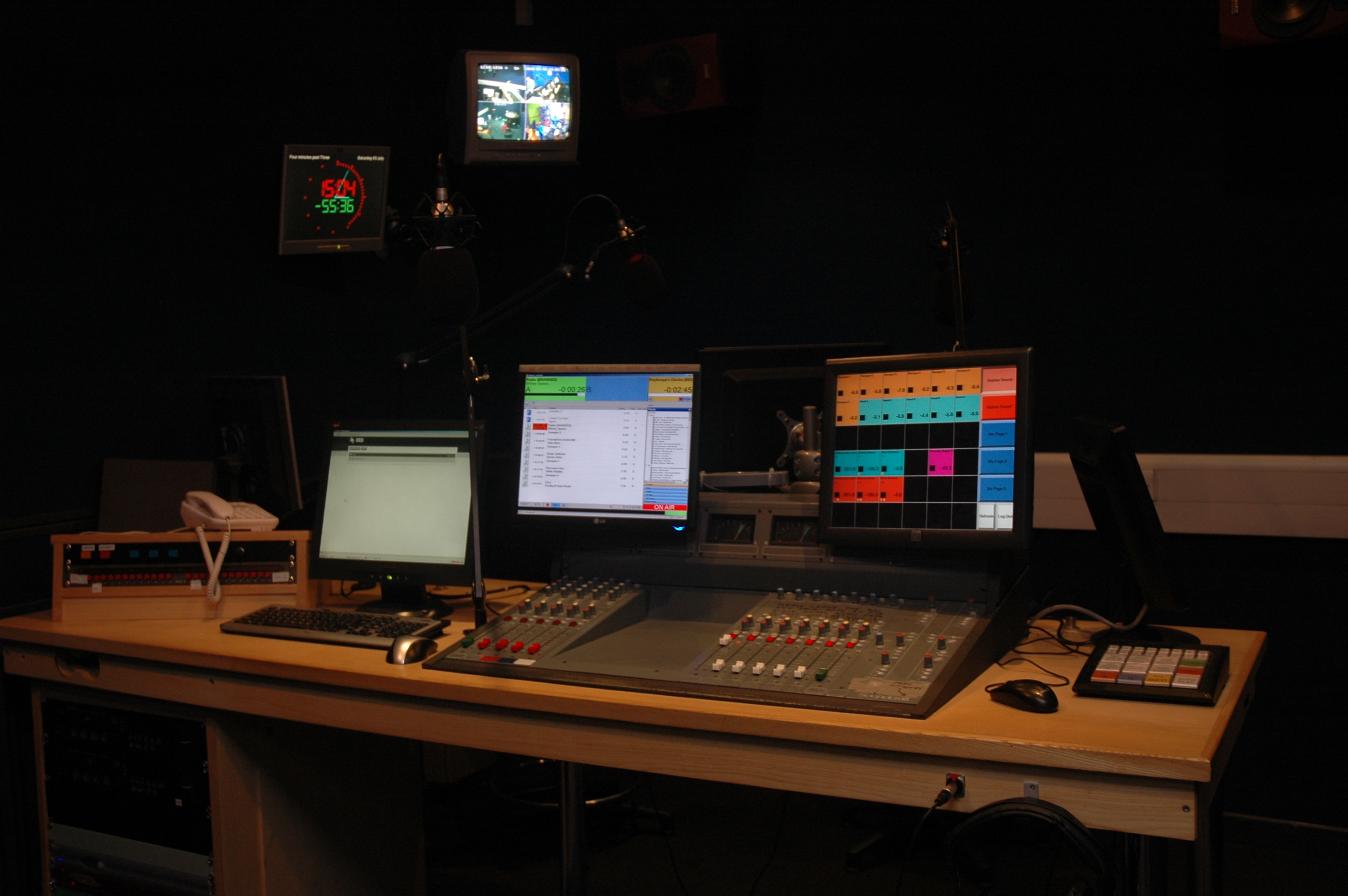
URN Studio Two after its 2010 refit

During the summer of 2012, the whole station was refitted to use a Studer digital system for audio routing and mixing.

In 2014 the station won the Student Radio Awards Best Station for a record breaking fifth year in a row and still holds the record for the most consecutive Best Station awards to this day.

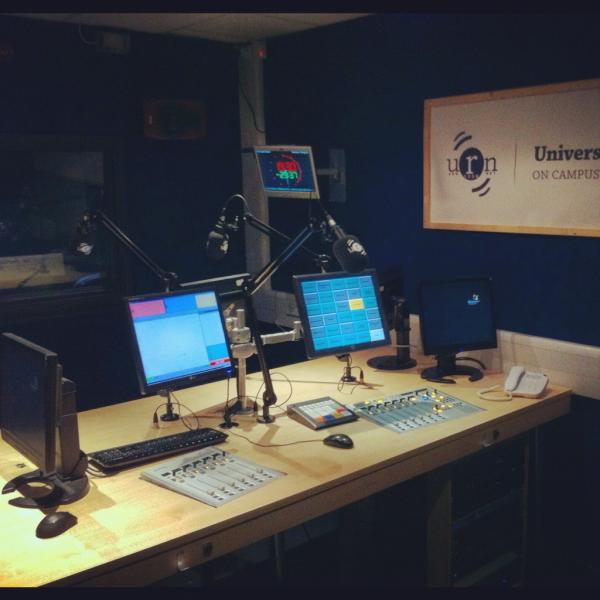
Studio 1 after first digital refit c.2020

In the summer of 2018, the station was relocated in the Students' Union Building to the new MediaZone. A brand new AoIP Studio was installed in spring 2020.

== Programming ==
URN broadcasts twenty-four hours a day during Nottingham term time, with shows from 08:00 a.m. to 04:00 a.m. The station is split into five sections: Daytime, After Dark, Culture, Sport and News shows. URN's programming includes news-show The Pulse, cultural-based programming, as well as sport and a large variety of other topics, daytime personality-based programming and evening specialist music shows. URN has a strong focus on University of Nottingham students in all areas of its programming.

== Stunts ==
Steve Doran accomplished a 40-hour continuous broadcast in November 2005 for Children in Need. In 2016, four teams walked 50 miles in under 24 hours in aid of Sport Relief.

During December 2020, presenters George Scotland and Damian Stephen attempted to get Russ Abbot's novelty track 'Atmosphere' to Christmas number 1, gaining endorsements from Paul Chuckle, Scott Muslin and Alistair Griffin. All proceeds were to go to charity with Abbot and his family fully behind the campaign.

== Famous alumni ==
The former head of music for URN presented BBC 6 Music's weekly chart show. Philippa Treverton-Jones graduated in 2007. She is now a TV producer. Another former presenter on the station; Ian Chaloner is the current producer of the Greg James Show on BBC Radio 1. Katie Baxter was a previous member of URN and now produces the Happy Hour Podcast. Rob Howard was another former presents; he now hosts Capital (radio network) Breakfasts.

== Awards ==
Student Radio Awards Best Station 2010

Student Radio Awards Best Station 2011

Student Radio Awards Best Station 2012

Student Radio Awards Best Station 2013

Student Radio Awards Best Station 2014

Student Radio Awards Best Station 2016

Student Radio Awards Best Station 2017

Student Radio Awards Best Station 2018

Student Radio Awards Best Station 2021
