= The Mancunion =

University of Manchester student newspaper

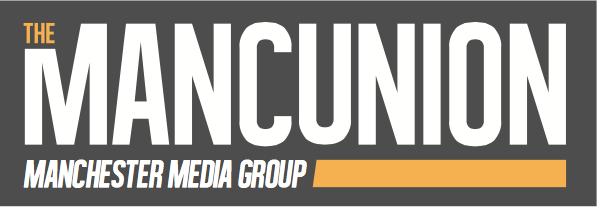
- Type: Print newspaper and website
- Format: Tabloid
- Founded: 1964
- Language: English
- Headquarters: University of Manchester Students' Union Oxford Road, Manchester, M13 9PR
- Website: www.mancunion.com

The Mancunion is the University of Manchester Students' Union's student newspaper. It is the largest student newspaper in the United Kingdom and is distributed throughout Greater Manchester. The name is a portmanteau of Mancunian, the demonym for residents of Manchester, and union, given its role as the newspaper of the Students' Union. Past writers include film critic Mark Kermode. The paper is published eight times each academic year.

== History ==
The Mancunion has existed in a various forms since 1964. It was first published in 1964 as a bulletin concerned with Union affairs, produced by the Union to compensate for perceived shortfalls in coverage in the main student newspaper, the Manchester Independent. Originally a rather amateurish publication, produced at irregular intervals, it is now a highly professional, tabloid-style newspaper, publishing news and articles on a wide range of issues and subjects. The newspaper and its journalists have won national student newspaper awards on several occasions.

On 22 September 1997 Student Direct replaced The Mancunion; this was a joint venture with other student unions in Manchester to create a single company to publish their newspapers. Student newspapers had been losing an increasing amount of money, and it was felt that pooling of resources could moderate this. Student Direct became the largest student newspaper in the country, owned by the University of Manchester, University of Salford and Bolton Institute. Each produced its own edition of the paper, but with most of the editorial work being undertaken at the University of Manchester Manchester Students' Union.

For the 2009/2010 academic year the Student Direct began to split into its component parts, with the Manchester edition becoming "Student Direct: Mancunion edition". By the 2010/2011 academic year they had fully transitioned to The Mancunion and The Salfordian, the student newspaper of the University of Salford Students' Union.

The Mancunion drew national attention in 2013 when a secret recording was made during a society meeting, at which it was suggested that the Islamist speaker supported the execution of homosexuals in Britain. The controversy that arose regarded both the sensitive content of what was said, as well as the ethical questions behind such investigative reporting methods. The society in question later dissolved following the scandal.

In October 2014, British tabloid The Sun contacted UK student media outlets asking them to find photos of students wearing offensive costumes at Halloween. The Mancunion broke this story, leading to attention from national media.

In September 2016 the Mancunion once again drew national attention both within the mainstream media and on social media with their coverage of the decapitation of a Margaret Thatcher cardboard cut-out at the Freshers Fair.

== Structure ==
The Mancunion is based within the Students' Union but retains editorial independence from it. In the past it has criticised the Students' Union and university in equal measure. As of 2015, the role of editor-in-chief of the newspaper has been restored to a full-time salaried position after a number of years of campaigning for it to be a sabbatical position, though now as co-ordinator of the Manchester Media Group, as a sabbatical role within the Union. This involves coordinating the development of all Student Media within the Union, including Fuse TV and Fuse FM.

The editorial team of The Mancunion is structured as follows: Each section has at least one editor, who commissions articles from student contributors, writes content themselves and sets the design of their own section each week. There are also subeditors who proofread and check articles for inaccuracies, and a photography team. These editors are collectively co-ordinated by the Managing Editors and Editor-in-Chief.

The Mancunion covers news occurring in the area around the University of Manchester campuses, as well as things that affect the national or international student body. It covers local cultural events and even national music festivals. Its opinion pieces focus on both local news, student issues, as well as the state of society as a whole.

The Mancunion works closely with the other student media outlets in the Union, Fuse TV and Fuse FM. This involves collaborating on projects and promoting the other outlets' work on its website and social media accounts. The Mancunion is also affiliated with the Student Publication Association.

In 2016, as part of the Manchester Media Group, Mancunion editors and student media volunteers established the Women in Media Conference. A student-led conference aiming to tackle gender bias within the media and encourage female students to pursue media careers. The conference is now an established part of the year for student media at the University of Manchester.

As The Mancunion grew over several years, the number of Managing Editors doubled from two to four students for the academic year of 2023-2024. Two Managing Editors covered the Culture sections, and two covered the News & Current Affairs sections. Four Managing Editors has now become the standard for the publication, with the additional responsibilities of overseeing the design, marketing and subediting teams.

== Awards ==
=== 1980s ===
In 1983, The Mancunion won Best Student Media and in 1987, Best College Newspaper both at the Guardian Student Media Awards.

=== 1990s ===
In 1999, Merope Mills won the Feature Writer of the Year award at the Guardian Student Media Awards.

=== 2000s ===
In 2001 and 2003, Student Direct won Photographer of the Year at the Guardian Student Media Awards. In 2003, Ravi Somaiya won Columnist of the Year.

In 2004, Stuart MacLean was runner-up for Reporter of the Year and Journalist of the Year. In the same year, Tim Hill was named runner-up for Columnist of the Year behind now-Guardian journalist Archie Bland.

In 2005, Daniel Calder was runner-up for Columnist of the Year.

In 2007, Matthew Dixon received the Sports Writer of the Year award.

In 2008, Daniel Calder was also the winner of the Diversity Writer of the Year, and in 2009 Clyde Macfarlane and Girish Gupta received winner and runner-up respectively of the Travel Writer of the Year award.

=== 2010s ===
In 2010, Student Direct: The Mancunion was the runner-up for Publication of the Year, behind Kingston University's The River.

In 2017 The Mancunion won the Best Design (Newspaper) award at the Student Publication Association (SPA) National Conference Awards. They were also nominated for six Student Publication Association awards, including two 'Best News' articles, Best Student Photographer, Outstanding Contribution to Student Media (Gemma Sowerby - Head Sub Editor) and Best Publication.

In 2018, The Mancunion's News Editor Cameron Broome was Highly Commended in the Outstanding Contribution category at the SPA National Conference Awards.

=== 2020s ===
In 2020, The Mancunion was awarded 'Highly Commended Best Publication' at the SPA National Conference Awards

In 2022, Jess Walmsley, Editor-in-Chief, led The Mancunion to win 'Best Publication in the UK & Ireland 2022', which is the highest achievement.

In 2022, Ella Robinson, Managing Editor of News & Current Affairs 21/22, won 'Best Journalist in the North' and 'Highly Commended Best Reporter in the UK & Ireland'

In 2024, The Mancunion won 'Best Website'.

In 2025, The Mancunion was awarded 'Highly Commended Best Publication in the North'.
