= RED Radio =

Red Radio
- Colchester; England
- Broadcast area: University of Essex campus, 1404 AM, and online.
- Frequencies: 1404 kHz (until 2008); Live Stream Real/WM

Programming
- Format: Various

Ownership
- Owner: University Of Essex Media Guild

History
- First air date: 1971

Links
- Website: www.essexstudent.com/media/red_radio

Red Radio was a student radio station of the University of Essex.

RED, as it is called in short, was part of the University of Essex Media Guild, along with newspaper The Rabbit and television station SX:TV. RED is a member of the Student Radio Association (SRA), and was nominated for best show in November 2007.

== History ==
The station was originally called University Radio Essex (URE), and was founded in 1971, making it one of the first student radio stations in the UK.

It was broadcast on 998 kHz (301 metres) using a "leaky cable" system which ran through ducting in the 'six towers' of student residences and was designed to ensure it could not be heard off-campus.

The frequency changed to 999 kHz with the realignment of medium wave broadcasting to 9 kHz spacing and in the 1980s it moved to 963 kHz (312 metres). After Radio Caroline re-commenced broadcasting on the same wavelength, URE moved back to 999.

It was renamed "RED AM 1404" in 2001 (by the station committee), renamed to "RED - 1404 AM" in 2007, and simplified to RED Radio in 2008, when it stopped transmitting in AM.

The station originally had three studios, and in 1998 transmitted on FM for a month, this number was reduced to two in 2004, and then to only one, renovated in 2007.

RED organised many events throughout term, including "The End": a BYOB and live music semi "rave", that occupied all 3 of the main squares of the University of Essex.

Red Radio used to broadcast during term time across the university campus and parts of Colchester on 1404AM/MW and over the internet. It was one of the first student radio stations in the UK to be licensed to broadcast on LPAM (instead of induction loops). It ran solely on the voluntary efforts of students, who dedicated their free time to keep it running, and the efforts of a part-time Station Manager, appointed by the University of Essex Students' Union. The decision to appoint a Station Manager was part of a process to have the UoE SU's Media Heads all be paid.

The station had a partial rebranding again in 2008 to overcome the problems with students not knowing what 'RED' was. The idea was to "bring it into age", dropping the 1404am and promoting the online aspects of the station, by marketing with the name and logo of 'RED Radio'. As of 2009 it became Rebel Radio.
