= Fuse FM =

Student radio station in Manchester

Coordinates: 53°27′51.8″N 2°13′55.8″W

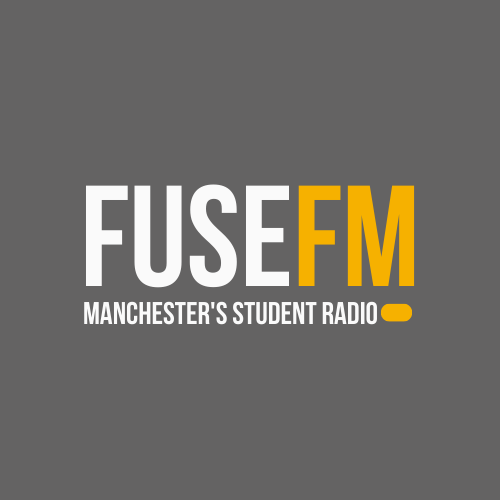
- (United Kingdom) UK - National Internet Manchester FM; England
- Broadcast area: Online
- Frequency: Online at www.fusefm.co.uk

Programming
- Format: Alternative/Student
- Affiliations: Manchester Media Group, The Mancunion, Student Radio Association

Ownership
- Owner: UMSU; (University of Manchester Students' Union)

History
- First air date: 15 February 2001
- Former frequencies: 106.2 FM

Links
- Webcast: www.fusefm.co.uk/
- Website: www.fusefm.co.uk

Fuse FM is a student radio station broadcasting every day during term time from Manchester Students' Union at the University of Manchester.

Fuse FM is run entirely by volunteers studying at the university, led by an elected Station Manager and Deputy Station Manager. In addition to broadcasting online, Fuse FM provide a platform for local DJs and bands. The station is a member of The Student Radio Association.

Currently, the station managers are Joe McCormick, Pearl Spencer, and Jude Bull.

== History ==
The Student Union Executive accepted a proposal to create the station in July 2000 and work began on creating a base for the station, which was originally called Mint FM. The name was changed to Fuse FM in October 2000. Space in the Union basement was converted into a fully functioning broadcast studio and production suite. Fuse FM went on air for the first time on 15 February 2001 at 06:00, broadcasting on 106.2 FM as well as via internet streaming.

Alex James Atkinson was elected as the first Station Manager for the station. Atkinson is now a presenter on the Sony Award nominated show In:Demand, which is broadcast from Hits Radio.

The first song played was R.E.M. - The Great Beyond, and traditionally each broadcast ends with Green Day - Good Riddance (Time of Your Life).

On Monday 9 November 2009, Fuse FM welcomed comedian Jack Whitehall as a one-off presenter. He was welcomed back once again on Wednesday 10 March 2010, taking the place of the station's regular premier show Craig & Jake's Afternoon Delight.

From 2003 to 2011, Fuse FM was broadcast for four weeks in each academic semester (September to October and February to March). However, since September 2011, the station has moved to broadcasting throughout the academic year, from September to June. The station also dispensed with FM broadcasting, with only online streaming via the website now available.

On 29 April 2012, Fuse FM began broadcasting from new state of the art studios on the first floor of the Steve Biko building. With support from the BBC, the Your Manchester Fund and the University of Manchester Students' Union, Fuse FM now has some of the best student radio facilities in the country, including two sets of Studer Micro Series digital sound desks.

On 26 April 2013, Fuse took part in the first ever Manchester Student Media Awards, which was organised by Station Manager Joe Kearney, taking place in Academy 2 in the Students' Union. Also awarded were the University's student paper, The Mancunion, and the student TV station, Fuse TV. The evening was hosted by Adam Brown, host of weekend breakfast on Capital FM Manchester. After all the awards were presented, there was a sound clash featuring DJs from both Fuse FM and The Hits Radio.

Commencing on 11 October 2016, 'Fuse Live' was introduced by Sophie Nebesniak, Ciaran Algar, Liam Armstrong, Temur Ahmed and Robin Loo. The first event at Academy 3 featured various acts, and a second one on 6 December 2016 included different performers. The third 'Fuse Live' on 16 March 2017, at Fallow Cafe in Fallowfield, sold out before headliners Howl performed, showcasing diverse artists.

In June 2023, Fuse FM worked alongside Manchester Media Group and the University of Manchester Students' Union to create Alive Festival, spotlighting local artists and DJs. This returned for a second iteration in October 2023, selling out at 1000 ticket sales.

The station was rebranded in 2023 with a new logo and website.

In September 2026, the station underwent further rebranding, with a new logo and brand identity created by Charlie O’Neill, and a complete website redesign directed by Deputy Station Manager, Jude Bull in collaboration with Spotlight Studios.

== Structure ==
Fuse FM broadcast daily from 9 am to 10 pm weekdays, 11 am to 10 pm Saturdays, and 2 pm to 9 pm Sundays during term time, presenting a mix of music, DJ, talk, sport, and news shows. Currently, there are over 120 members of Fuse FM.

== Awards ==
Fuse FM has a history of high quality student broadcasting, with its DJs having won many awards at the National Student Radio Awards. In 2023, Honor Mant, Head of Talk Shows, won Best Entertainment Programming at the annual Student Radio Awards in London. Fuse FM was won silver for Best Branding.

Student Radio Awards
Year	Award	Nominee	Status
2025	Best Multiplatform Initiative	Fuse FM	Gold Prize
2024	Best Station Branding	Fuse FM	Silver Prize
2024	Best Technical Achievement	Fuse FM	Silver Prize
2023	Best Entertainment Programming	Honor Mant	Gold Prize
2023	Best Station Branding	Fuse FM	Silver Prize
2012	Female Presenter of the Year	Hattie Pearson	Gold Prize
2010	Best Newcomer	Chelsea Dickenson	Gold Prize
2007	Female Presenter of the Year	Becca Day-Preston	Bronze Prize
2006	Male Presenter of the Year	Andrew Jackson	Gold Prize
2005	Female Presenter of the Year	Minnie Stephenson	Gold Prize
2003	Website of the Year	Ian Gregory, Kate Fitzpatrick and Graham Nimbley	Bronze Prize

As part of her prize, Hattie covered an early morning breakfast slot on BBC Radio 1 on Friday 29 March 2013.

== See also ==
- The Mancunion
- The University of Manchester's Students' Union
- Student Radio Association
- Student Radio Awards
