= Nottingham University Gliding Club =

Student club

The University of Nottingham Gliding Club (UoN Gliding) is the gliding club of the University of Nottingham. The aim of the club is to provide affordable flying in order to introduce as many members as possible to unpowered flight. Affiliated with the Cranwell Gliding Club (CGC), the club is open to any full or associate member of the University of Nottingham Students' Union.

== Current status ==
The club is one of some 28 University Gliding clubs within the UK, and with over 130 members for the 2016–2017 academic year is also one of the largest. Flying takes place all year-round on weekends and bank holidays at RAF Cranwell, though several expeditions to other gliding sites are organised throughout the year.

== History ==
The club was formed in the 1970s, and was officially affiliated to the Buckminster Gliding Club at Saltby Airfield. The founding member was Mr Brian Spreckley, then an undergraduate at the university, and subsequently the 1987 World Gliding Champion. In 1987 he was awarded the Gold Medal of the Royal Aero Club. Then, in 2005 he was also the recipient of the FAI Paul Tissandier Diploma for services to gliding.

In 1990 the club moved from Saltby to begin a new affiliation with the Four Counties Gliding Club, flying from RAF Syerston until 2004, and subsequently at RAF Barkston Heath. The affiliation with Four Counties ended when that club moved to RAF Wittering.

Since May 2005 UoN Gliding have been affiliated to and fly with Cranwell Gliding Club at RAF Cranwell.

== Club fleet ==
The current club fleet consists of:

- Grob G103a Twin II Acro (NU2). Purchased in December 2006 from the RAFGSA, the ‘Twin II’ Acro is a high-performance two-seater sailplane made by Grob Aerospace. The aircraft is of T-tail configuration, with glass fibre construction, and is fitted with a non-retractable undercarriage and upper-surface airbrakes. It is designed for training, high performance, and aerobatic flying.
- G102 Astir CS 77 (NU). Purchased in 2011, the Astir CS 77 is a high-performance single-seater sailplane made by Grob Aerospace. The aircraft is of T-tail configuration, with glass fibre construction, and is fitted with a retractable undercarriage and upper surface airbrakes. It is designed for cross-country flying.

In addition to the UoN Gliding fleet, club members also have access to Cranwell Gliding Club's extensive fleet. This includes:

- Two-seaters
  - Duo Discus (16)
  - ASK 21 (R18)
  - ASK 21 (R21)
  - Scheibe SF-25C (G-SACN)
- Single-seaters
  - LS8 (R4)
  - Discus CS (R8)
  - Astir CS (R57)

The club's members are not charged soaring fees (i. e. not charged a 'per minute' fee) when flying their gliders. Cranwell gliders are charged at either 20p or 25p per minute of flight time (first 10 minutes free). As per standard gliding custom, neither UoN Gliding nor Cranwell Gliding Club charge for instruction.

=== Fleet history ===
Current & previous aircraft owned by the club:

Type	Reg	Date Bought	Date Sold	Additional Comments
Grunau Baby V	BGA1903	1973	1976	
T.21	n/k	n/k	n/k	Nicknamed Rhubarb and Custard.
Ka 2 Rhönschwalbe	BGA2439	1979	1984	Damaged after a failed winch launch at Saltby Feb 1984. Flying again in May after extensive repairs. However, in June it was written off in an incident at Camp Hill.
Blaník	G-ASVS	1984	1994	Now flies under the trigraph EVR.
ASK 13	HPE	1994	2008	Sold to Dumfries & District Gliding Club.
K 8B	EPT	n/k	1997	1/2 share. Now flying at Lasham Gliding Society.
Schleicher Ka 6cr	FNP	1997	2001	Bought from a member of Buckminster GC. Sold to Trent Valley Gliding Club.
Astir CS	NU	2002	2006	Written off at Keevil Airfield, June 2006 (Pilot unharmed). Wreckage was brought by private owner who repaired it and now flies it at Peterborough & Spalding Gliding Club
Acro	NU2	2007	Present	Glider refinished in 2018
Skylark II	CCS	2007	2012	Donated to the club as a replacement for NU, later gifted to Lincolnshire gliding club.
Astir CS-77	NU	2011	Present	

== Competitions ==
The club, and its members, have a long record in competing in Inter-University, Regional, and National competitions.

=== Club ===
As a club, a number of competitions are participated in each year. These include events such as the Inter University Gliding Competition and the Inter Club League.

=== Individual ===
Many of the club's members have competed with success at the Junior National Gliding Championships, the premier Gliding Competition for those under 26 years of age in the UK. Some members have also gone on to compete in both National Championships and at International level. The club's founder, Mr Brian Spreckley, has gone on to become a Gliding World Champion (see club history above), and ex-committee-member Mr David Bromley was the 2017 UK national champion in the standard class, placed 5th in the 2015 European standard class championship, and 13th in the 2018 standard class World championship.
