= University of Manchester Students' Union =

English representative body of students

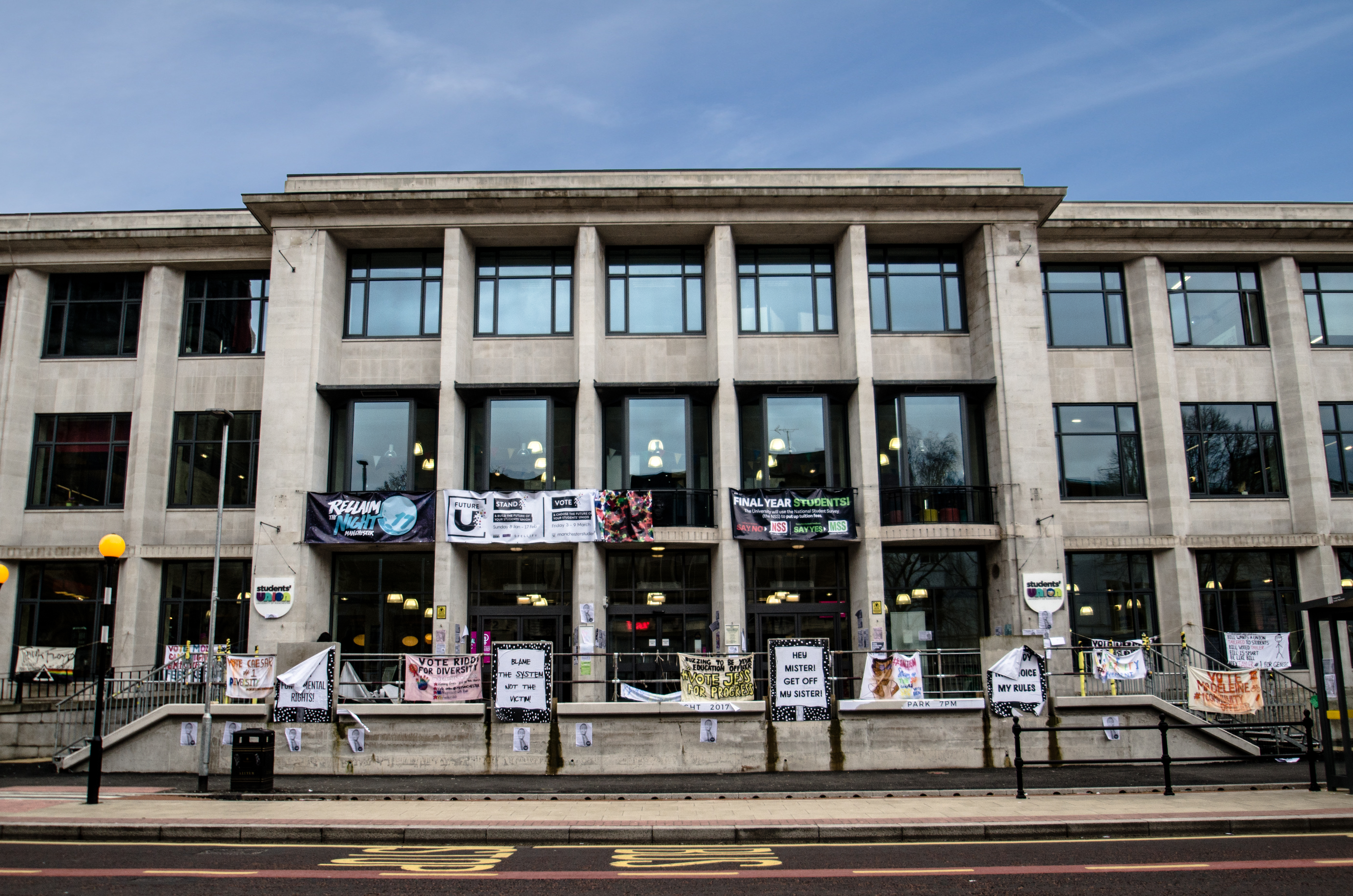
- Motto: We’re your student life, amplified.
- Institution: The University of Manchester
- Location: Steve Biko Building, Oxford Road, Manchester, England
- Established: 2004 (after merger of USA and UMU)
- CEO: Ben Ward
- Executive officers: Hannah Mortimer (Co-Chair); Aisha Akram; Tesnime Safraou; Robbie Beale; Katie Jackson; Raluca-Elena Valcescu; Raheel Ansari; Ansab Ali
- Trustees: Peter Ptashko (Co-Chair); Leo Fields; Renarta Guy; David Weatherall; Benjamin Hobbs
- Members: 40,000+
- Affiliations: National Union of Students, Aldwych Group
- Website: manchesterstudentsunion.com

The University of Manchester Students' Union is the representative body of students at the University of Manchester, England, and is the UK's largest students' union with over 40,000 members. It was formed out of the merger between UMIST Students' Association (USA) and University of Manchester Union (UMU) when the parent organisations (UMIST and the Victoria University of Manchester) merged on 1 October 2004.

It does not have a president, but is instead run by an 8-member executive team who share joint responsibility.

== Governance and decision making ==
=== Executive Team ===
The current University of Manchester Students' Union Exec Team contains eight full-time sabbatical officers. All have their own areas of responsibility, but share joint responsibility as trustees of the Students' Union. Any student can stand to be an elected member of the Exec Team in the student elections that take place in March. All students are eligible to vote in these elections online. For the academic year 2026–27, the current roles are as follows:

- Union Affairs - Anna Ward
- Activities & Culture - Aaina Mohapatra
- Postgraduate Research - Beck Heslop
- Wellbeing & Liberation - Grace Hollingsworth
- City & Community - Hasan Patel
- Faculty of Humanities - Alec Severs
- Faculty of Science & Engineering - Jack Newton
- Faculty of Biology, Medicine and Health - Ann Lee

== Facilities ==
=== Steve Biko Building ===
The Steve Biko Building (often referred to simply as the Biko Building, or Students' Union) is the Union's primary building and the home of its administrative offices. The building went under major redevelopment in 2012 which included a renovation of the foyer and meeting rooms, the addition of the new Café and the introduction of a new store and sandwich shop. The building also contains a hairdressers and a print shop. Further renovation in 2023 added various food stalls. The building is named after anti-apartheid activist Steve Biko.

In October 2012, the university announced that it would be awarding £4 million to the Students' Union in order to make further building improvements. This is likely to involve the construction of another floor on the Steve Biko building and should be completed by 2018.

=== Barnes Wallis Building ===
The Barnes Wallis Building, named after Barnes Wallis, is situated on the former UMIST Campus (now North Campus). It originally contained the offices for the UMIST Students' Association. Unlike in the Biko building, the Students' Union does not occupy the whole building but has facilities on the ground floor. In 2013, the Union withdrew from these premises as part of the University of Manchester's Campus Masterplan.

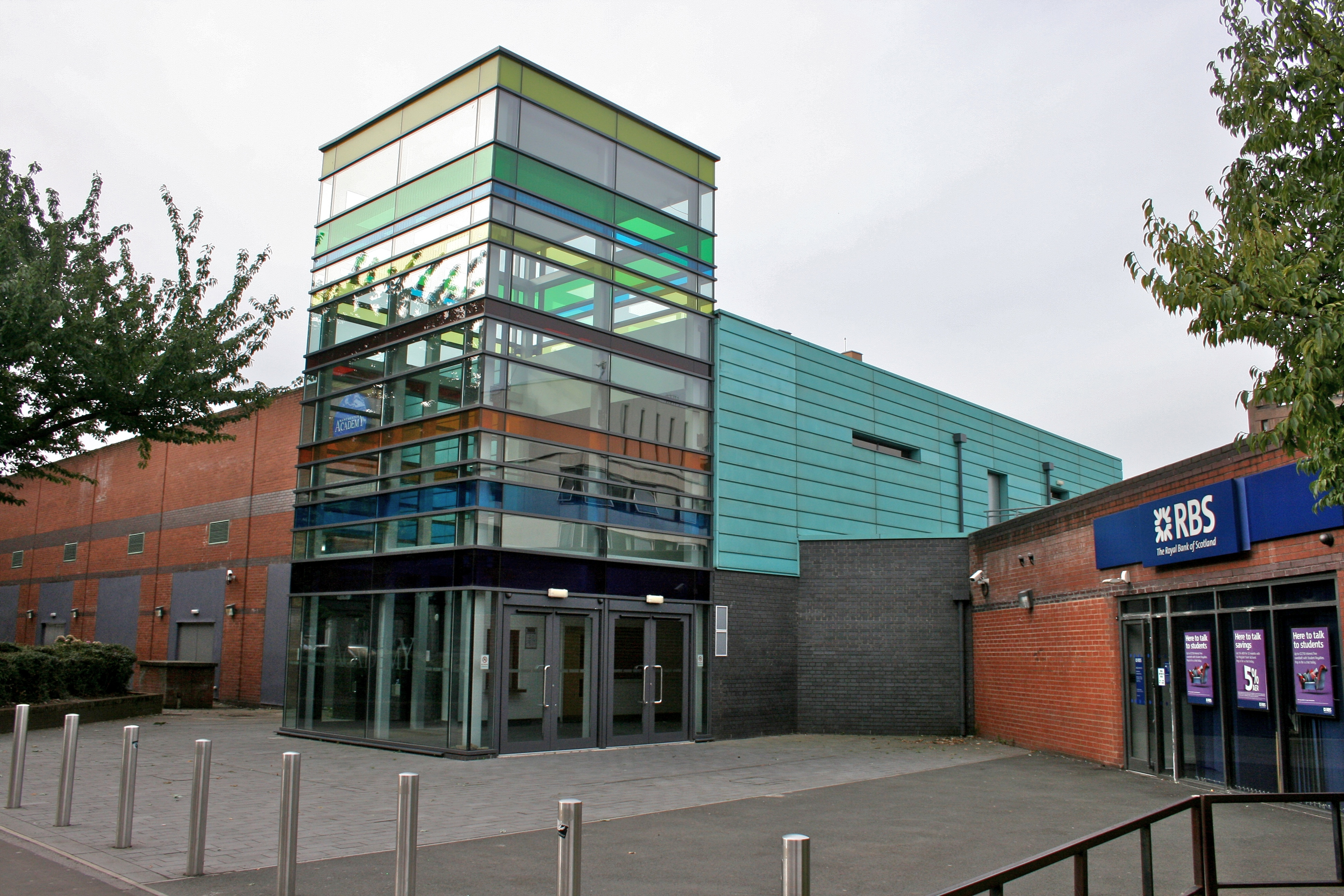
The Manchester Academy

=== Manchester Academy ===
Manchester Academy refers to the University of Manchester Students' Union's four concert venues. They are situated on Oxford Road both within and adjacent to the Biko building. "Manchester Academy" was originally the name of the largest of these venues (see picture), but became an umbrella term for both itself and the Union's other venues in 2003. It has hosted such big names as Ian Brown, Muse, Prince, Kylie Minogue, The Stranglers, Super Furry Animals, Deftones, Pink Floyd, The Cure, The Coral, Blur, Oasis, George Clinton, Nirvana, Manic Street Preachers, The Libertines, The Ramones, Billy Talent, Fightstar, Lost Prophets, Babyshambles, Lee "Scratch" Perry, Supergrass, It Bites and Death Cab for Cutie.

== Student activities ==
There are many student-run activities which involve thousands of students in various roles including media, community volunteering fundraising for charity and over 250 societies.

=== Pangaea Festival ===
University of Manchester Students' Union is notable for regularly organising and hosting what is reportedly the largest student-led festival in Europe. This is a triannual event where approximately 6000 students are invited to the Students' Union to enjoy a multi-venue music and arts night utilising rooms throughout the Steve Biko Building and the adjacent Manchester Academy 1 building, to mark the end of most University of Manchester undergraduate exams and a special "Freshers" edition in September.

=== The Mancunion ===
The Mancunion is the University of Manchester's Students' Union's newspaper. It is distributed across the city and has a readership of 20,000. The current Editor-in-chief is Charlie Spargo, the Deputy Editor-in-chief is Marcus Johns, and it has an Editorial Team of around 30 volunteers. The paper has widespread circulation within the Greater Manchester student community and it is believed to have the largest circulation of a student paper in the United Kingdom.

=== Student Action ===
Student Action is a community volunteering project that sends student volunteers out to work in the local community. In 2010, there were over 2500 active volunteers working anything from 20 to 300 hours over the year.

=== Manchester RAG ===
Manchester RAG is the official fundraising arm of the University of Manchester Students' Union. It is responsible for helping facilitate the fundraising activities of all students in Manchester, and in doing so promoting the personal development of students. Last year Manchester RAG helped University of Manchester students raise £190,000 for a variety of charities, ranging from small community based charities in the North West, to large international development organisations. The vast majority of funds raised come from the many events that Manchester RAG organise throughout the year. Popular events include Jailbreak, a sponsored hitch where participants have to get as far away from Manchester without spending a penny in 30 hours, Bogle, a 55-mile walk around greater Manchester, and Beerfest, a three-day student run beer festival which attracts over 1500 students annually. RAG also runs many "challenge" events such as sponsored expeditions to Mt Kilimanjaro, Everest Base Camp and the Great Wall of China. All fundraising is conducted by hundreds of student volunteers, and the organisation of RAG is run primarily by a committee of students who volunteer their time in addition to their studies.

=== Fuse FM ===
Fuse FM is University of Manchester Students' Union radio station. The Student Union Executive accepted the a proposal to create the station in July 2000 and work began on creating a base for the station, which was originally called MintFM. Space in the Union basement was originally converted into a fully functioning broadcast studio and production suite. Fuse FM went on air for the first time on 15 February 2001 at 06:00, broadcasting on 106.2 FM as well as via internet streaming. Since 2003, Fuse FM has broadcast for four weeks in each academic semester. Fuse Fm was briefly denied its Spring 2008 licence to broadcast, due to the startup of community radio station RockTalk. However RockTalk collapsed in late 2007 and Ofcom granted a licence for FuseFM's 16th Broadcast.

In September 2011, Fuse FM went online only broadcasting throughout the university term time. And on 29 April 2012 began broadcasting from new state of the art studios on the first floor of the Steve Biko building after generous funding from the Manchester Learning Enrichment Fund and donation of equipment from the BBC.

Fuse has a history of high quality student broadcasting and its DJs have won awards in the past three National Student Radio Awards. In 2007 Becca Day-Preston won the Bronze Prize for Female Presenter of the Year, Andrew Jackson won Male Presenter of the Year in 2006, while Minnie Stephenson claimed the Female Presenter of the Year award in 2005.

=== Societies ===
There are many clubs and societies operating within the union and the university. Common areas include sports, hobbies, politics and religion. Sports societies are not operated by the union but rather by the university itself through the athletics union. There are several fairs during the freshers period in which various clubs and societies promote themselves.

There are a wide range of religious societies and places of worship within the university. A religions fair is held too, where information is distributed about the different societies. There are large Christian, Muslim, Jewish, Hindu, Sikh, Buddhist and Baháʼí Faith societies, which hold regular events and meetings.

Most of the large subjects have their own society, which generally represents the interests of students in that subject as well as offering advice and support to students and arranging socials. Examples include the BA Econ society, the history society and the faculty of life sciences society.

The university also has a strong drama tradition and former students include Meera Syal, Adrian Edmondson, Rik Mayall and Ben Elton. The drama society holds a yearly drama festival, involving 13 plays in five theatres and over 120 students, as well as coordinating several independent student-run productions. The fringe society in 2006 took twelve plays and over 70 students to the Edinburgh Fringe festival under the company name "Johnny Miller Presents". The company was awarded a ThreeWeeks Editors' Award, which honours the most talked about and exciting people and companies at the festival.

Other academic societies combine leisure and learning to create events and to build a community of members interested in particular areas or subjects. These include the molecular networks society, the UKSEDS Society, the consulting society, and the astrobiology society. In February 2021, the latter put together a panel of experts in Astrobiology for the event "Universal Dialogues", one of the biggest online events in the history of the University of Manchester, with over 700 attendees from all over the world. Richard Dawkins, Didier Queloz, Carol Cleland, David Duner, Philip Ball and Richard J. Roberts discussed together topics such as the definition and meaning of life, whether we are alone in the universe or not, or the social and cultural implications of encountering an extraterrestrial civilisation.

The University of Manchester is the inaugural home of fraternities in the United Kingdom as we have them today, being the first to host a professional fraternity in Europe, with Alpha Kappa Psi installing chapters in 2001 at University of Manchester Institute of Science and Technology (UMIST), University of Manchester (UOM) and Manchester Metropolitan University (MMU). The chapter at the Manchester Metropolitan University later closed, with the remaining chapters merging to form the Sigma Upsilon Phi chapter we still have today. The chapter was founded by former Students' Union executive, Kash Haroon. Subsequently, more professional fraternities have taken interest in the inaugural British presence, with student Andrew W. Fretwell standing up a chapter of the engineering fraternity, Theta Tau, in 2026.

== Notable campaigns and issues ==
=== Twinning with a Palestinian university ===
University of Manchester Students' Union is twinned with An Najah University, Nablus, Palestine. A motion to enact the twinning was passed in a General Meeting in March 2007. The meeting was attended by over 600 students and the motion was passed by a majority of over 50 votes.

In November 2007 a motion was proposed in the general meeting. It resolved to freeze the University of Manchester Students' Union's association with Al Najah University whilst awaiting a statement "denouncing terror and disassociating it from all terrorist organisations".

An-Najah responded to the motion with a full statement written by the Right to Education campaign. An-Najah rejected the motion and all the accusations: "Neither the University nor its Student Council is a terrorist organisation, and the implication that they are is insulting." They added that the motion is: "defamatory because it repeatedly implies that ANU and its Student Council promotes, facilitates or has links with terrorism".

An amendment was put forward by the "protect our twinning campaign". The amendment resolved to accept the invitation made by An-Najah University for an olive tree from the university to be planted on campus at Manchester as a gesture of peace and as a symbol of life, rather than requiring An Najah to accept the statement denouncing terrorism. This amendment passed with almost a two-thirds majority of the attendance of over 1100 students.

The twinning would have ended in March 2010, in accordance with University of Manchester Students' Union bye-Laws; however the sign was renewed by a decision of the executive team and remained. In October 2014, a motion was brought to the students' union to renew the sign and the twinning motion for an additional three years, and the idea went to referendum, with 693 votes in favour and 204 against. However, a legal challenge was brought about the nature of the twinning motion and the sign itself, and the students' union responded by removing the large sign in March 2015.

== History ==
A students' union and refectory building existed at Owens College on the site afterwards used for the Christie Library (1898). A larger union and refectory building was built in 1909 on Burlington Street. Both these buildings were adjoined by a gymnasium. The union and refectory building was enlarged in 1936 but the union moved to the new union building built at 242–256 Oxford Road by J. S. Beaumont from 1953 to 1956. In 1960-65 the same architect was responsible for a new refectory and staff house on the Burlington Street site (a building which included the Moberly Tower hall of residence).

More recently, the Students' Union has experienced a number of controversies around the treatment of students employed as staff members in the union's bars, cafes and admin offices. In 2021, UMSU was accused by student staff of trying to coerce them into agreeing to 'poverty wages' as part of the government's furlough scheme; the union also allegedly failed to communicate with student staff about wages, workplace safety and hours during lockdown. The union only appeared to reverse its decision following criticism in both student and local media.

In a 2026 referendum, the members of the Students' Union voted to disaffiliate from the National Union of Students (NUS). A major part of the campaign to disaffiliate was the NUS's "lack of public engagement with the Palestinian cause".

=== Visits ===
In 1968 the Labour Secretary of State for Education, Patrick Walker, gave a speech, interrupted by many protesters. The protesters were expelled from the university for the rest of the year.

Michael Heseltine visited in November 1983, and was attacked with paint. His time of visit was disclosed the day before. Two hundred anti-nuclear protestors were outside the student union, and one sprayed Heseltine with red paint, from a detergent bottle concealed in a plastic bag. Students chanted 'better red than dead'. Heseltine was to speak to Conservative students at 12pm. Heseltine entered the building but student protesters prevented him from getting him into the venue to speak, for fifty minutes. At around 12.50pm, eighteen uniformed officers, and a battering ram, got Heseltine in to speak. Heseltine borrowed a white shirt from one of the police. As Heseltine walked across the platform, two eggs were thrown, but missed. Student chants, littered with vile obscenities, interrupted Heseltine's ten minute speech, from around thirty protesters. One chant of 'jobs not bombs' went on for one minute. The Manchester University CND emphatically did not support the attack, and said that the attack was caused by the Socialist Worker and Revolutionary Communist Party students. Fifty demonstrators had stopped traffic by laying down on the main road outside, including the Rev Alfred Willetts.

Also on Friday 19 November 1983, 1,500 peace demonstrators had gathered at the University of Birmingham, where Heseltine was to speak, with two eggs hitting his car. Inside, he was persistently heckled in his hour long speech, and Barry Blinko, of the Socialist Worker Students Society, took to the stage, shouting for two whole minutes. Half of the audience gave Mr Heseltine a standing ovation.

Leon Brittan visited on 1 March 1985 at 6.30pm, known as the 'Battle of Brittan'. After Heseltine, the local police were not taking any chances whatsoever, and would take any brutal method required, with any disruption. Across the building was a large banner 'Support the miners one year on'. From out of nowhere, around thirty police from Greater Manchester Police's Tactical Aid Group, similar to London's Special Patrol Group, arrived from Dover Street, and forced people out of the way, injuring many people in the process. Thirty three people were charged with public order offences, three were charged with assault, and two convicted. Protesters had planned to 'turn their back' on Mr Brittan, as he spoke. But after the brutality of the police Tactical Aid Group, the protesters changed their mind, and there followed an 'improvised rant'. Of 200 in the audience, half were hurling foul-mouthed abuse. Brittan called the foul-mouthed student protesters 'a bunch of lunatics'. The THES described the protesters as 'infantile', and it gave 'higher education a bad name with the public'. At the courts, nineteen protesters were convicted in April and May 1985. The BBC featured the protest in an episode of Brass Tacks entitled 'A Fair Degree of Force'. The Welfare Secretary of the union had been brutally assaulted by the police, and as a qualified doctor, took civil action against Greater Manchester Police in 1991.

== Notable former officers ==
- Daniel Brennan, Baron Brennan (president 1964–65)
- Anna Ford (president 1966–67) - Anna Ford was the first female president of UMU in 1966-67 and, on recommendation of the students' union became chancellor of the Victoria University of Manchester on 16 December 2001. Upon the merger with UMIST she became the co-chancellor of the new University of Manchester.
- Liam Byrne (communications officer 1992–93) - (former Chief Secretary to the Treasury)
- Jeff Smith MP (entertainments officer 1984–85) - (Member of Parliament)
