= K.W. Electronics =

British manufacturer of amateur radio equipment between 1950s and 1970s

K.W. Electronics was a British manufacturer of amateur radio equipment founded in the mid-1950s by the late Rowley Shears G8KW. It was based in Dartford, Kent, and manufactured a wide range of high frequency band receivers, transmitters and accessory equipment. The company was taken over by DECCA and subsequently ceased production during the 1970s.

== Products ==
- KW Vanguard transmitter
- KW Valiant transmitter
- KW Viceroy SSB transmitter
- KW Vespa SSB transmitter
- KW 76 receiver
- KW 77 receiver
- KW 103 SWR meter
- KW 105 Antenna Tuning System
- KW 107 Supermatch ATU (antenna tuning unit)
- KW 108 Monitor scope
- KW 109 High power version of KW 107
- KW 110 Q multiplier
- KW 160 transmitter NB KW 160 was also the designation for a 160-meter Aerial Matching Unit.
- KW 201 receiver
- KW 202 receiver
- KW 204 transmitter
- KW 600 linear amplifier
- KW 1000 linear amplifier
- KW 2000 transceiver
- KW 2000A transceiver
- KW 2000B transceiver
- KW 2000E transceiver
- KW Atlanta transceiver
- KW PEP METER
