= University of Nottingham Students' Union =

- Institution: University of Nottingham
- Location: Portland Building, University Park, Nottingham, NG7 2RD
- Established: c. 1880 (as cycling club); 1913 (as a formal entity)
- Chairperson: Nicola Maina
- Chief Executive: Richard Evans
- Members: 34,670 (2018–19)
- Affiliations: Russell Group Students' Unions, National Union of Students, British Universities & Colleges Sport, Universitas 21 Student Network, National Postgraduate Committee Citizens UK
- Website: www.su.nottingham.ac.uk

The University of Nottingham Students' Union (often abbreviated as UoNSU ( /ˈjɒnsuː/)) is the students' union at the University of Nottingham, England. It is a representative body that aims to represent students to both the university and the wider community.

The Students' Union is housed in the Portland Building on University Park campus, a building shared with some non-student union activities. The union receives a block grant from the university of over £2 million to support its activities, although the union also raises money through income streams such as the Union shop and a bar.

All members of the University of Nottingham are automatically members of the Students' Union, unless they use their right to opt out of membership. As such the University of Nottingham Students' Union has over 34,000 members. The Union obtained charitable status in 2010 and is overseen by a Board of Trustees made up of student-elected sabbatical officers and full-time staff.

== History ==
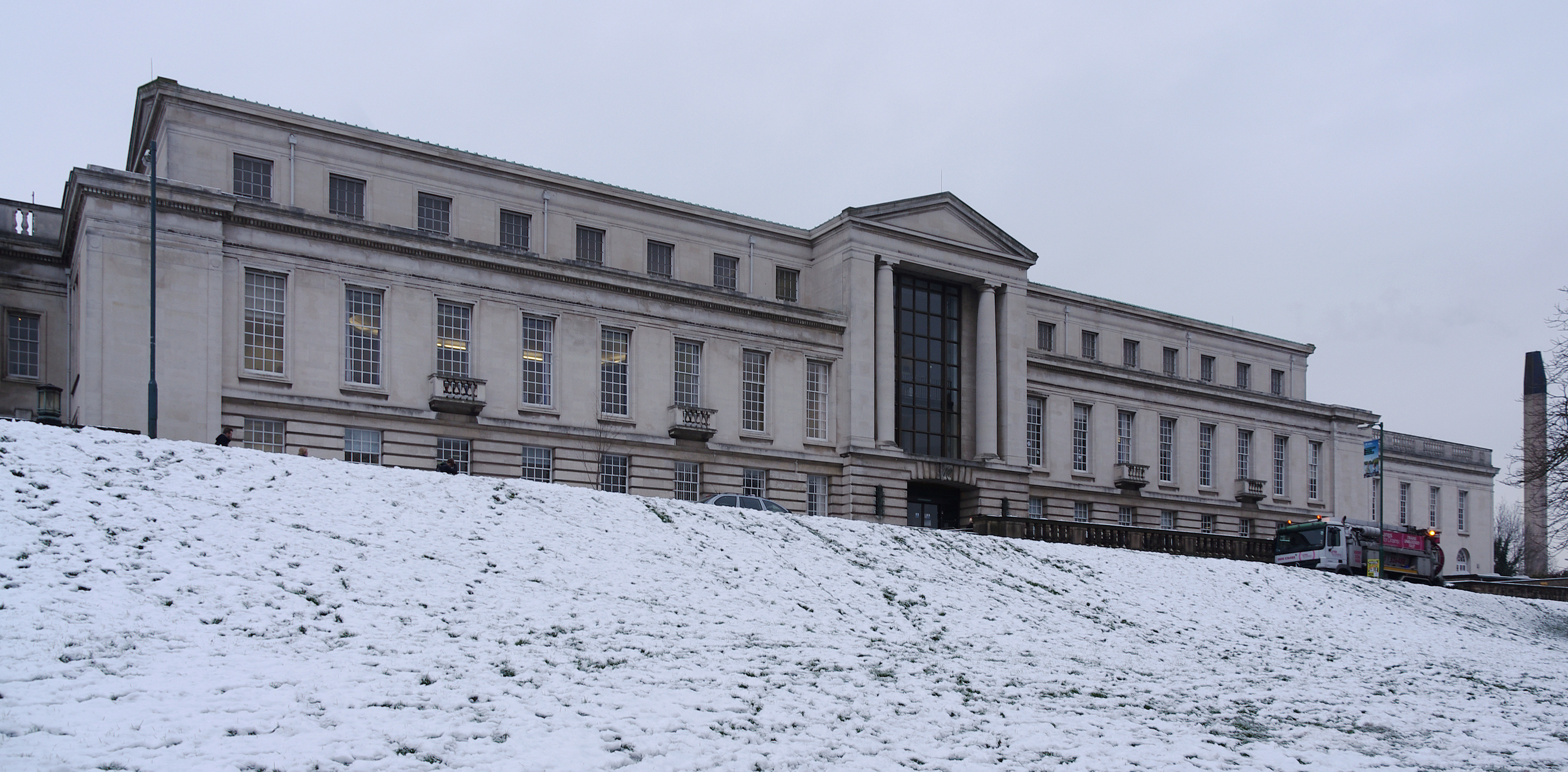
University of Nottingham Students' Union is housed in the Portland Building (pictured) on University Park Campus, Nottingham

The Students' Union is a charitable organisation, enshrined by legislation such as the Education Act 1994, and responsible for a number of areas of work: student representation, student activities, student advice on education and welfare, and campaigning.

=== Early years ===
The Union's activity started in the 1880s when a cycling club was formed. At the old university college site in the city centre the 'RAG' started in 1923. The Gong Magazine (now Impact, having been Gongster and Bias at various points) initiated in 1939 was an early sign of developing union life.

=== Expansion ===
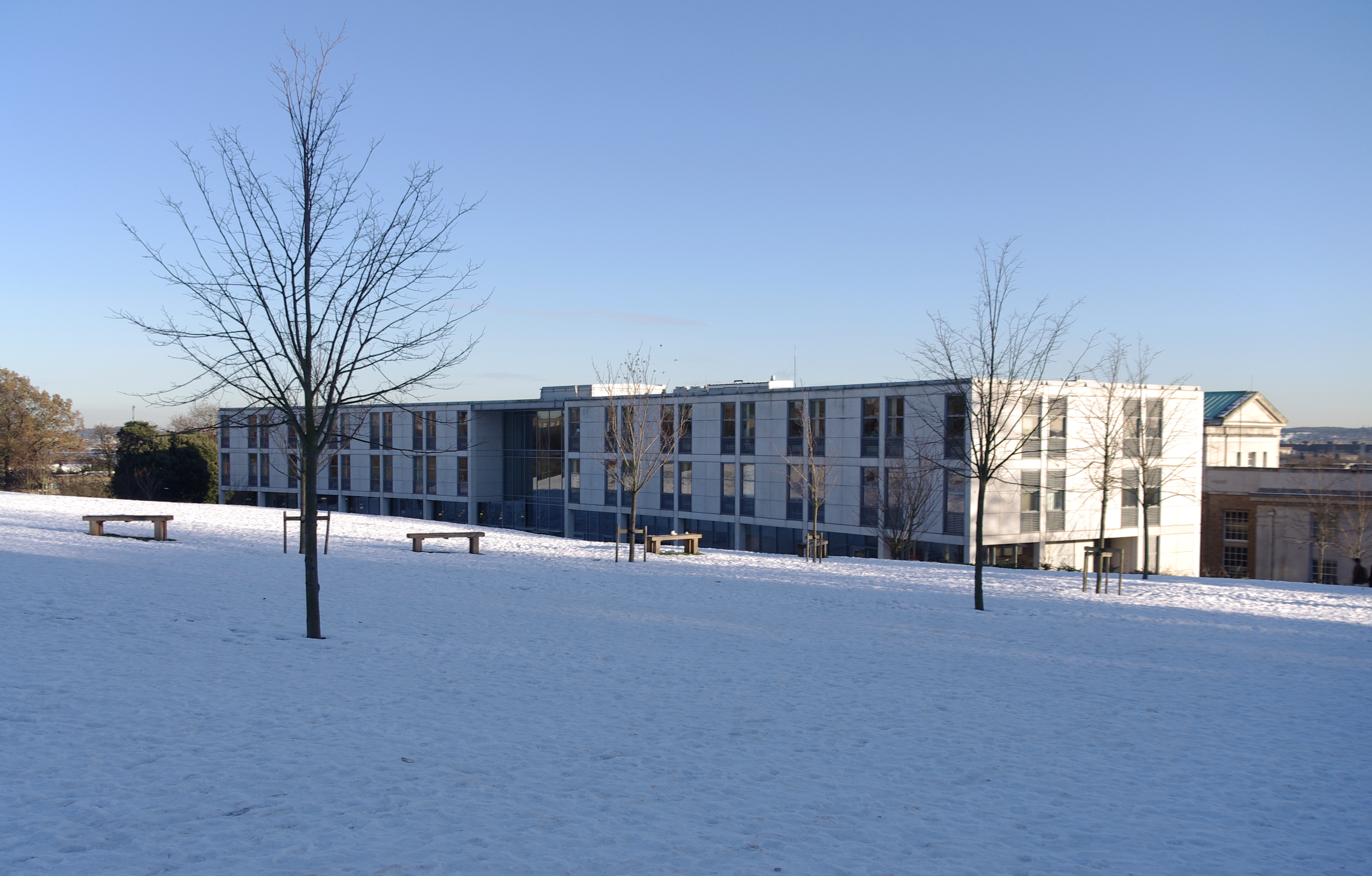
The Portland Building's rear entrance during snow in December 2010

In 1928 the expanding college moved to the new out-of town Highfields Estate and here the Union's first permanent residence was in the lower corridor of the Trent Building. By 1956, the Portland Building had been opened, and was originally designated as a Union building, but although the Union is the major user, the management of the building has always rested with the university.

In the 1960s, the Union rationalised its representative system into a series of guilds, mostly based on halls of residence as 'constituencies'. This system worked well for over two decades, before a critical mass of students came to live outside halls, at which point the strong communities on which the guild system was based lost their universality.

During the 1970s the Union took on a more militant air, with sit-ins and student strikes. This did lead to some positive results, such as student representation of many university committees – an opportunity openly satirised by the 1980s as less of a revolutionary shift than expected.

The pace of change in the Union accelerated after the Robbins Report, as rises in student numbers drove it towards a bigger capacity, more permanent staff and sabbatical officers, more rooms and offices and bigger turnovers and budgets. Income rose from £250,000 in 1982 to £1,480,000 in 2006. Membership rose by 23,000 in the same period, whilst staff numbers more than trebled.

=== Incidents ===
David Hunt, Baron Hunt of Wirral visited on Friday October 26 1984, and was blocked from speaking, by 400 students, striking miners and the Socialist Workers Party.

Norman Tebbit was drowned out by megaphones, when he visited.

=== UNU ===
Prior to 2000, the University of Nottingham Students' Union was known as the University of Nottingham Union, abbreviated to UNU. The renaming was intended to clarify the Union's status as a students' union.

Recently, the Union has started to address a number of pressing challenges presented by the dynamism and growth of the university under Sir Colin Campbell – such as provision of union services to members at East Midland sites beyond the main Nottingham campuses.

== Governance ==
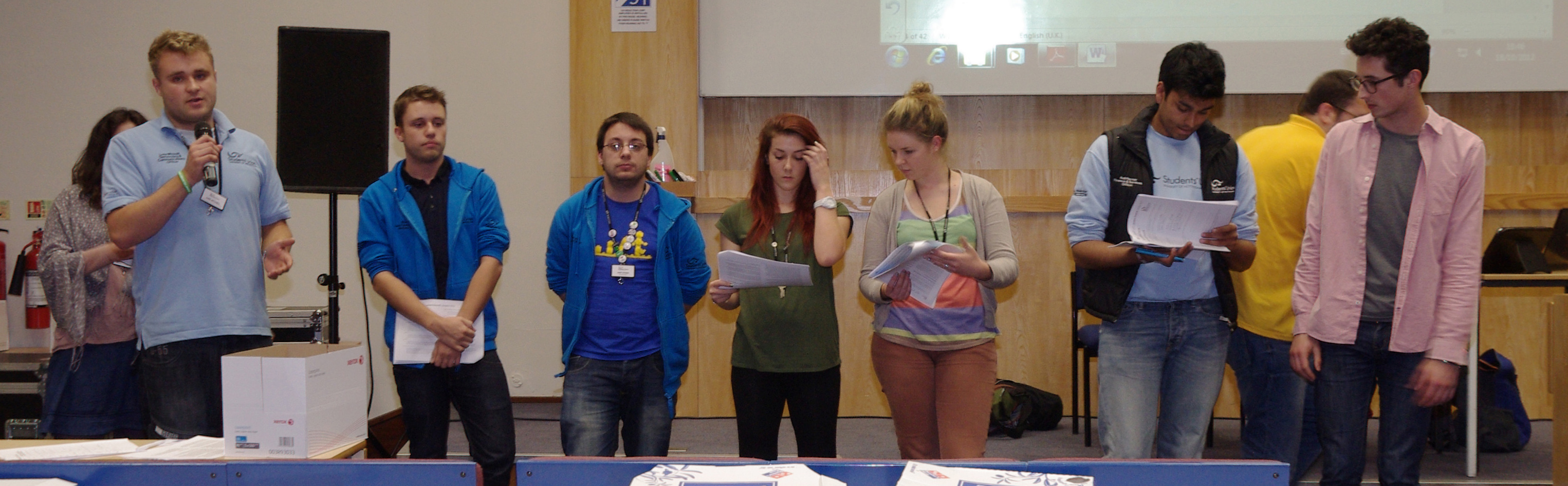
The union executive committee 2012/13, taking questions at the 411th (1st) Union Council in October 2012.

The Students' Union is governed by its Constitution and Regulations, a document which is informally known as the 'Big Red Book'. The Students' Union also maintains a policy file, which outlines its stance on various issues. The Students' Union is established by the statutes of the university, which provide that "There shall be a Union of Students of the University" and that "Ordinances shall prescribe the constitution, functions, privileges and other matters relating to the Union of Students." Ordinance XI: Union of Students fulfils this role. Changes to the Constitution, Regulations and Policy File are typically made by Students' Union Council; however, the whole membership can vote on a policy in a referendum. In 2016 a referendum was held on whether the Students' Union would remain a member of the National Union of Students. The referendum was one of a number of referendums held by Students' Unions following the election of Malia Bouattia as National Union of Students President. The Referendum came back with a strong Yes Vote, this was despite strong and substantiated evidence that the No Campaign predominantly led by students from Nottingham University Conservative Association had been supported including financially by UNiDAYS which caused huge controversy and accusations of incompetence on the part of the returning officer.

=== Council ===
Students' Union Council is the highest regularly meeting decision-making body of the Students' Union. It meets at least seven times per year. For Council to make any binding decisions it has to be quorate; the quorum for Students' Union Council is set at 50% of voting members of council. Members of Students' Union Council can be either voting or non-voting members. The voting members are designed to be representative of the membership of the Students' Union as a whole. Most non-voting members sit on council to represent various views that it is felt important to have represented at this level, but where they do not represent a clear constituency of students. Each Student-Run Service, for example, has a non-voting seat on Council, since it is felt that there will be issues that it will be useful to have their input on, but that those involved in their organisation are already represented through a council rep.

The constituencies for voting members of students' union council are, for the most part either residential or subject-based. Generally, first year undergraduates are grouped into constituencies determined by their residence, with students in subsequent years represented through their subject or faculty. The remaining Council positions are held by the Executive Officers, JCR and Association Heads, and Student-Run Service Heads.

In 2011 democratic reforms were announced that would in effect abolish Council and replace it with a new democratic structure. The current democratic structures have only been quorate 17% of the time in the past 10 years and it was widely felt that they were not publicised well enough.

=== Officers ===
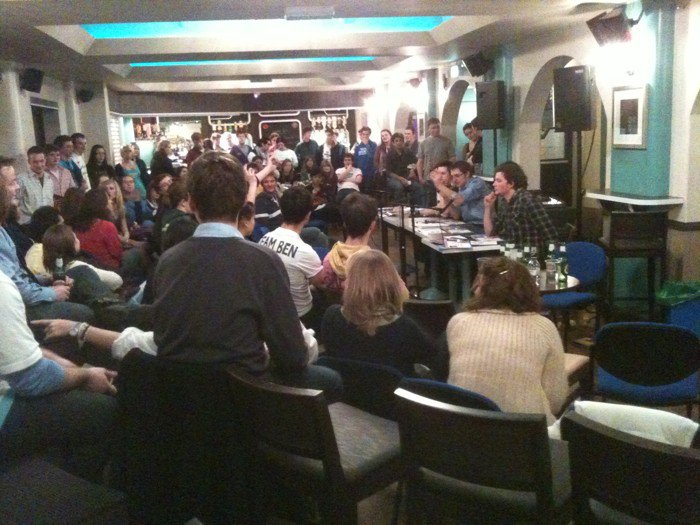
Candidates attending a Candidate Question Time held on Sutton Bonington campus

There are six Executive Officers of the Students' Union. These are sabbatical roles, which involve the office-holder either taking a year out from their studies, or taking office for a year after they finish their course. An individual is allowed to hold a sabbatical position for a maximum of two terms. These are elected by a cross-campus ballot of all students.

The current Executive Officers are:

- Riffat Shaheen, president
- Isatu Kargbo, vice president liberation and welfare
- Alma Ying Ying, vice president education
- Farhan Khan, vice president postgraduate and international
- Jasmine Murray, vice president sports
- Tabish, vice president activities and development

From 2008 to 2025, there were also several unpaid non-sabbatical 'Part-time' Officers, who held their positions alongside their studies. These Officers would work to represent select constituencies of students and their interests, such as the Disabled Students' Officer or the LGBT+ Students' Officer. These officers were elected by a cross-campus ballot of students who self-define into the constituency of the respective officer.

== Activities ==
=== Residential associations ===
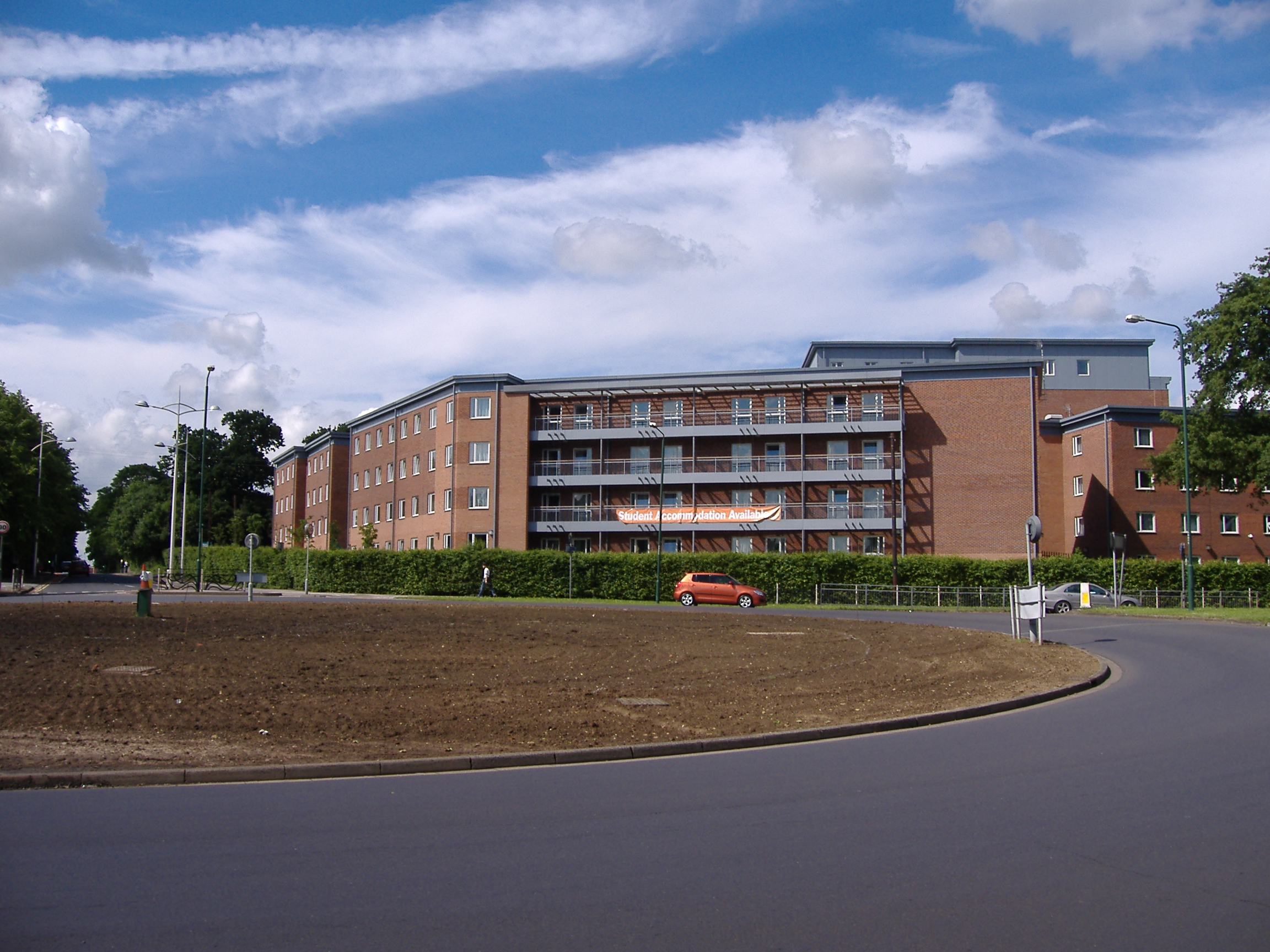
Broadgate Park (pictured) has a residential Association which represents over 2000 people.

More commonly called JCRs (junior common rooms) these committees are elected from students in halls to put on social events throughout the year. There is also a Regional Students Association for students who are not living in halls.

There is a Presidents' Committee ('Pres Com') where presidents of halls can share best practice. The JCRs are supported by a member of staff called the JCR development worker.

=== Networks ===
There are several student networks chaired by the respective Part-Time Officers.

- Disabled Students' Network
- BME Network
- LGBT Network
- Mature Students' Network
- Women's Network
- Environment and Social Justice Network
- International Students' Network

=== Student-Run Services ===
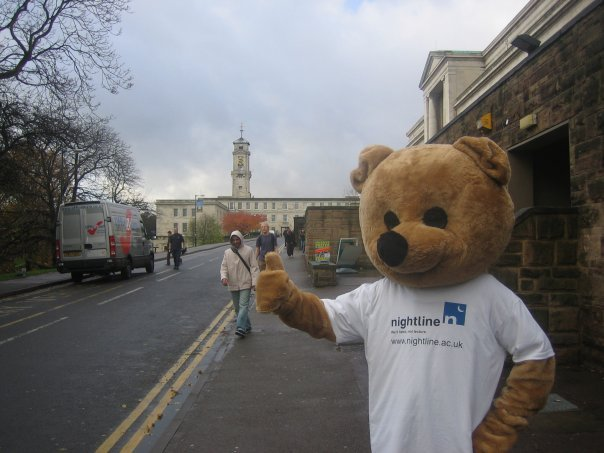
The Nightline Bear (pictured) is a mascot used to promote awareness of a confidential student listening service available to all students

The Student-Run Services (SRSs) are set apart from societies since they exist for the benefit of the wider student body. Each Student-Run Service is run by an elected student committee. As of January 2021 there are eight Student Run Services.

- TEC PA & Lighting – Company providing technical services for SU and external events such as concerts and club nights. The group was founded in the 1940s.
- Portland Music Library – CD & Record Library running since the 1970s with over 10,000 CDs and 4000 vinyl records available.
- Impact – the official magazine for students at the University of Nottingham
- Karnival – Europe's largest student-run charitable organisation – A rag group which raises money for charity
- New Theatre – Student Theatre company
- Nightline – Welfare-based telephone listening and information service
- URN – Student Radio for Nottingham
- NSTV – Nottingham Student Television, previously known as 'NUTS' or Nottingham Union Television Station. Re-branding took place in 2014.

Previous Student Run Services have existed including Week One which put on events in freshers week to welcome new students but was abolished in 2014/2015 after Week One Reps had been found encouraging the chanting of violent necrophilia and sexism. The non-SRS replacement Welcome Program was subsequently established to undertake a similar role to Week One with greater oversight to prevent any repetition of such incidents.

=== Societies ===
The University of Nottingham Students' Union administers one of the largest student society programmes in the United Kingdom, with over 450 student groups as of 2026. The Union claims that this is the highest number of societies of any UK university. Societies operate across a broad spectrum of interests, including academic and subject-based groups, cultural and faith societies, political organisations, performance and creative arts groups, and recreational and specialist hobby societies. Activities range from traditional pursuits such as chess and gliding to more niche interests and activities such as medieval combat.

The Nottingham Economics & Finance Society (NEFS) is reported to be the largest society at the university, claiming a membership of over 4,000 students. This figure is partly due to the fact that all first-year economics students at the university are entitled to free membership as part of their course.

The Nottingham Debating Union is among the oldest student organisations at the university, having existed in some form since 1927. The society has historically organised weekly debate training sessions, participated in inter-university debating competitions, and hosted public debates on campus. Other longstanding societies include the Nottingham University Conservative Association, founded in 1933, and the Bellringing Society, established in 1958. These societies reflect the longstanding tradition of organised extracurricular activity at the university.

Societies at the University of Nottingham are student-led and typically managed by elected committees, with oversight and administrative support provided by the Students' Union. They organise a range of activities including regular meetings, competitions, performances, conferences, and social events throughout the academic year.

=== Sports ===
There are over 70 sporting clubs affiliated to the Students' Union. As well as the Sports Clubs, the Union also runs one of the largest intramural sporting programmes in the country with hundreds of teams competing each week in a variety of sports including rugby, football (5-a-side and 11-a-side), hockey, basketball, ten pin bowling and volleyball. The winners of each sport then compete in an annual intramural varsity match against Loughborough University.

==== Varsity Series ====
Held annually, the Varsity Series is a series of sports matches against Nottingham Trent University held over the Spring term in ten different disciplines: rugby union (men's and women's), hockey (men's and women's), basketball (men's and women's), football (men's and women's), ice hockey (men's), Netball (women's), cricket (men's), swimming (men's and women's combined) and rugby league (men's).

The series is one of the best attended series in the UK, with over 6,000 watching the ice hockey, and 3,500 watching the football and rugby. The games are held at the top sporting venues in Nottingham; both the football and rugby at Meadow Lane (home of Notts County), and the ice hockey at the National Ice Arena.

=== Education Network ===
The Education Network is the name given to the Course Rep system. The Network is chaired by the Education Officer. There are 5 Undergraduate Faculty Coordinators and 5 Postgraduate Faculty Reps (both elected in cross campus elections). There are School Reps for each School/Department and finally Course Reps (currently around 1000).

== Campaigns ==
The Students' Union has run a number of campaigns over the years on a wide range of subjects affecting students. These include B-EAT aimed at helping those with eating disorders and an Exam Stress campaign aimed at helping students get through the exam period. Around January when students begin to consider housing options for the next year a campaign is run to help students look for housing. The Student Advice and Representation Centre are also available to check housing contracts free of charge.

=== Living wage and anti-casualisation campaign ===
Started in 2012/2013 the Living Wage campaign is an ongoing campaign to see the University of Nottingham become a Living Wage Foundation Accredited Employer together with the Students' Union. The Campaign is led by student campaigners with the backing of the Students' Union alongside the University and College Union, Unite and Unison Trade Unions and Nottingham Citizens.

== Prizes and awards ==
There are currently four levels of awards granted by the Students' Union to graduating students:

- Ordo Caligulae
- Honorary Life Membership
- Union Prize
- Student Experience Award

The Students' Union makes the following awards to non-students:

- Don Varley Award
- Golden Jubilee Award

=== Ordo Caligulae ===
The Ordo Caligulae is the highest award of the Students' Union, and includes Honorary Life Membership of the Students' Union, and consequently members of the Ordo Caligulae enjoy those benefits detailed under Honorary Life Membership. Membership of the Ordo Caligulae (literally, "The Order of the Boot") is granted to those "who have given outstanding contribution to the University of Nottingham Students' Union." It is probably named after Jesse Boot (later Lord Trent), who was a great benefactor of the university.

Members entering the Ordo Caligulae are presented with a cast metal boot on a pedestal at the Union's Annual General Meeting.

=== Honorary life membership ===
Honorary Life Membership is conferred on those who have furthered the achievements of the aims of the University of Nottingham Students' Union.

The Students' Union Constitution lays down certain rights of its members (including Honorary Members):

1. Take part in functions organised by the Students' Union.
2. Become members of all Clubs and Societies affiliated to the Students' Union.
3. Attend Union Council, Executive Committee and Standing Committees
4. Wear official university colours.

(Further rights, such as the ability to stand and vote in Students' Union Elections, are reserved for "Full Members" – those registered as students at the university). In recent years typically five to eight new Honorary Life Members have been created in any year.

With typically thirty recipients each year (from a graduating class numbering around 8000) the Union Prize is presented to graduating students of the University of Nottingham in recognition of their contribution to the benefit of the students.

== See also ==
- Nottingham Trent Students' Union
- List of students' unions in the United Kingdom
