= Student Radio Association =

British student broadcasting organisation

Student Radio Association Ltd (SRA)
- Predecessor: National Association of Student Broadcasting (NASB)
- Formation: August 2019
- Type: Private company limited by guarantee
- Purpose: Student radio
- Headquarters: 167-169 Great Portland Street, 5th Floor, London W1W 5PF
- Location: United Kingdom
- Website: studentradio.org.uk

The Student Radio Association (SRA) is a representative body which supports and acts on behalf of the UK student radio community, comprising radio stations that are associated with or linked to a place of education. It is a not-for-profit organisation, which exists to encourage and facilitate communication between student stations. It was dissolved by Companies House in May 2018, but was reincorporated on 30 August 2019 as the Student Radio Association Ltd Ltd.

== History ==
The SRA was formed following the liquidation of the National Association of Student Broadcasting (NASB), which was formed as a limited company on 5 August 1988. NASB, a Private company limited by guarantee, was dissolved in January 2002, although had collapsed as a business in 1991. That year saw the creation of the SRA as a community. In November 2007, the SRA was incorporated as a Private Company Limited by Guarantee. There are 65 member stations of the SRA, which includes student radio stations across the UK. Membership to the SRA is on a yearly basis.

The SRA receives support from a number of industry partners, some which have been associated with the organisation for many years. The Radio Academy provides free membership for SRA members. Students involved with the SRA automatically become part of the Association of Student Radio Alumni (ASRA) following their graduation, which is a network of people formerly involved in student radio. Other associated organisations include Global Media & Entertainment and BBC Radio, which provides speakers at SRA events.

== The SRA Officers ==
The SRA is run by officers that have various roles within the organisation. The SRA is governed by an elected executive team, with elections held annually and voted by the station managers of member stations. The latest elections took place online, with the following individuals elected to office from July 2026:

- Chair – Adam Clark
- Deputy Chair & Operations Officer – Kenzie Pickersgill
- Growth & Development Officer – Jamie Woods
- Marketing and Communications Officer – Lily Stuart
- Membership Officer – Joshua Dodd
- Events Officer – Matthew Wakeham
- Music Officer - Erin Strom

Administrative roles within the SRA are chosen by the departing executive team. The SRA also appoints regional officers that provide support for stations in a region of the UK. Candidates for regional officers are elected to the role following a vote by the station managers in their region.

== The Student Radio Awards (SRAs) ==
The Student Radio Awards (SRAs) is an awards scheme celebrating talent within the UK student radio industry, held annually since 1996 and supported by BBC Radio 1 and Global Radio. The awards are announced in a ceremony in November, with past presenters including well-known radio personalities, such as Fearne Cotton, Greg James, and Nick Grimshaw. The first awards took place at the University of London Union. Due to the increased popularity of the event, the SRAs moved to The indigO2 in London in 2008. The awards on offer range from Best Newcomer, Best Interview, and Best Live Event, up to the most prestigious, Best Student Station of the Year. . Each year, the Awards features a chairperson, with previous chairs including Steve Lamacq, Stephanie Hirst, Huw Stephens, and Dev.

In 2008, the Kevin Greening Creativity Award was introduced to reward students that had displayed new and innovative radio. The award is named in honour of Kevin Greening, a former chair of the awards and presenter on Cambridge University Radio. Greening co-hosted The Radio 1 Breakfast Show with Zoë Ball from 1997 to 1998, prior to his death in 2007.

The following are the winners of some of the major awards since 2020:

	2020	2021	2022	2023	2024	2025
Station of the Year	RAW 1251AM	University Radio Nottingham (URN)	Spark Sunderland	Leeds Student Radio		Spark Sunderland
Best Presenter	Not Awarded	Nila Varman	Chrissy Cameron	Hope Lynes	Matt Hallsworth	George Gompertz
Joe Lyons Award for Best Producer	Seb Cheer	Chris Steers	Ella Wydrzynska	Connor Begley	Joshua Dodd	Emma Stigter
Kevin Greening Award for Creativity	'Dancing For Peace' by Nikki O	'Letters From a Stranger' by Ella Bicknell	'Plane Ticket' by Queen's Radio	Rebekah Newnes	'Carols at the Minster in 5.1 Surround Sound' by University Radio York	'Down The Black Trail' by University Radio York
Best Newcomer	Ricky Eatough	Chrissy Cameron	Grace Daily	Fion Cudmore	Helen Lumsdon	Luke Carr

== SRA Conference ==
Each year, the SRA holds a conference, usually during the University Easter break. Each year, member stations submit a conference proposal to hold the conference at their university. The SRA committee selects the winning station towards the start of each year. The conference takes place over 3 days and is funded through ticket sales. At the SRA Conference, speakers are invited to speak on a variety of subjects, including the future of Student Radio and radio techniques. Speakers are invited from radio organisations, such as the head of BBC Radio 1 Aled Haydn Jones.

From 2010, the 'Amplify Awards' (formerly 'I Love Student Radio' awards) have been held at the conference. These are in addition to the SRAs and are dedicated to rewarding the people behind the scenes of student radio. Awards include the "Most Improved Station", which was won in 2024 by Fuse FM. As well as the awards, the SRA annual general meeting is held at the conference.

The locations of all conferences since 2006 are listed below:

Year	Host University	Source
2006	University of Southampton	
2007	University of York	
2008	University of Bath	
2009	University of Leeds	
2010	Nottingham Trent University	
2011	University of Hertfordshire	
2012	University of Bradford	
2013	De Montfort University, Leicester	
2014	Newcastle University	
2015	University of Exeter	
2016	Cardiff University	
2017	De Montfort University, Leicester	
2018	University of East Anglia	
2019	Swansea University	
2020	Not held due to COVID-19 pandemic	
2021	Virtual Conference	
2022	Newcastle University	
2023	University of Exeter	
2024	University of Leeds	
2025	University of Salford	
2026	University of Salford	
2027	Bids Open	

== SRA Chart Show ==
The SRA runs the National Student Radio Chart Show, which broadcasts live across the UK every Sunday from 2pm. The chart broadcasts from a different member station each week, with student presenters from that station in charge of the show. The show is aired on member stations that have signed up to air the show and is repeated on across the student radio network throughout the week.

The show lasts for 120 minutes, counting down the top 20 biggest hits playing on student radio across the UK. Stations that host the show are eligible to enter the Best Student Radio Chart Show category at the Student Radio Awards.
