= Campuses of the University of Nottingham =

The University of Nottingham operates from five campuses in Nottinghamshire and from two overseas campuses, one in Ningbo, China and the other in Semenyih, Malaysia.

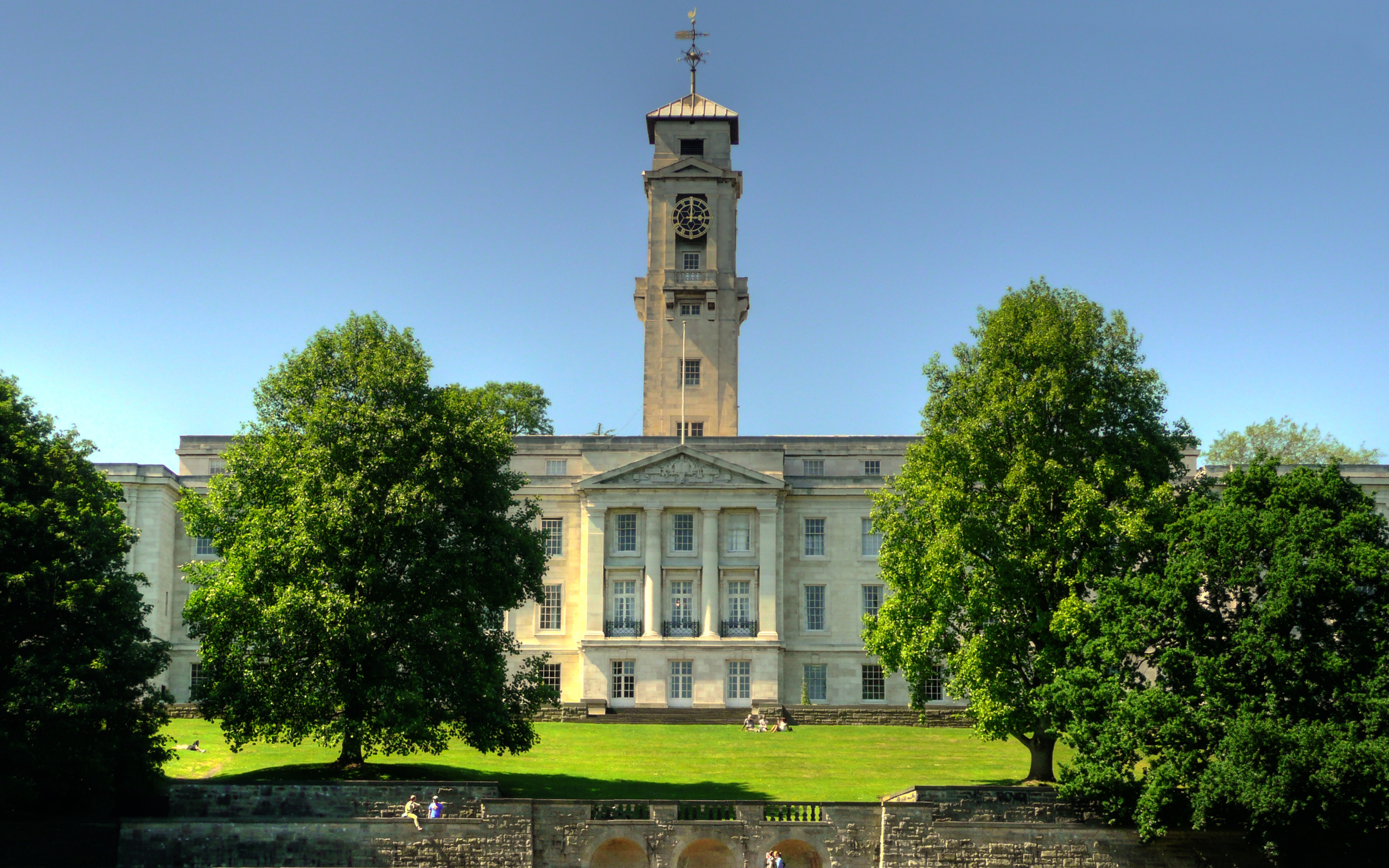
Trent Building, University of Nottingham

The Ningbo campus was officially opened on 23 February 2005 by the then British Deputy Prime Minister, John Prescott, in the presence of Chinese education minister Zhou Ji and State Counsellor Chen Zhili. The Malaysia campus was the first purpose-built UK university campus in a foreign country and was officially opened by Najib Tun Razak on 26 September 2005. Najib Tun Razak, as well as being a Nottingham alumnus, was Deputy Prime Minister of Malaysia at the time and has since become Prime Minister of Malaysia.

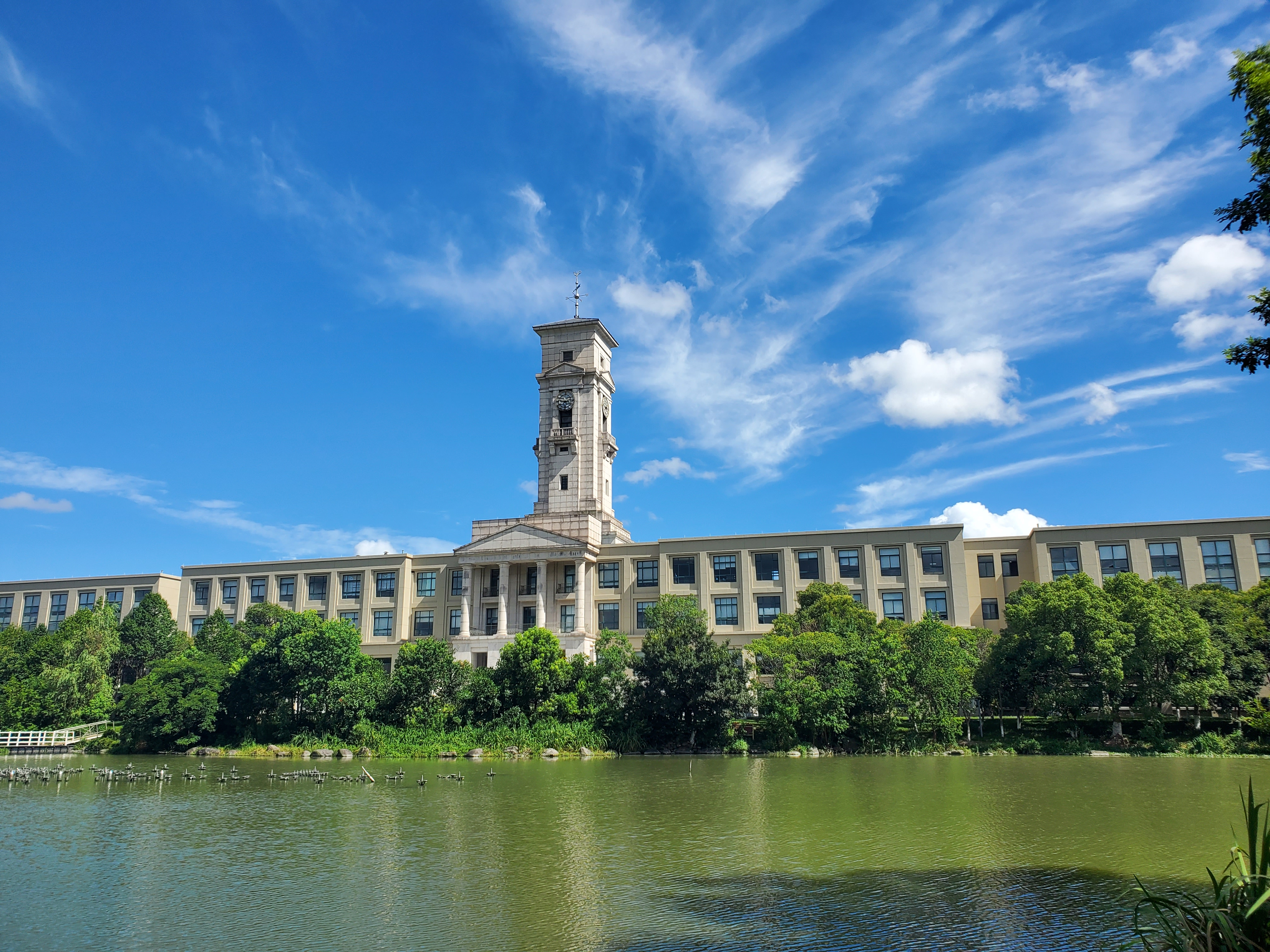
University of Nottingham, Ningbo, China

University Park Campus and Jubilee Campus are situated a few miles from the centre of Nottingham, with the small King's Meadow Campus nearby. Sutton Bonington Campus is situated 12 miles (19 km) south of the central campuses, near the village of Sutton Bonington.

== University Park Campus ==
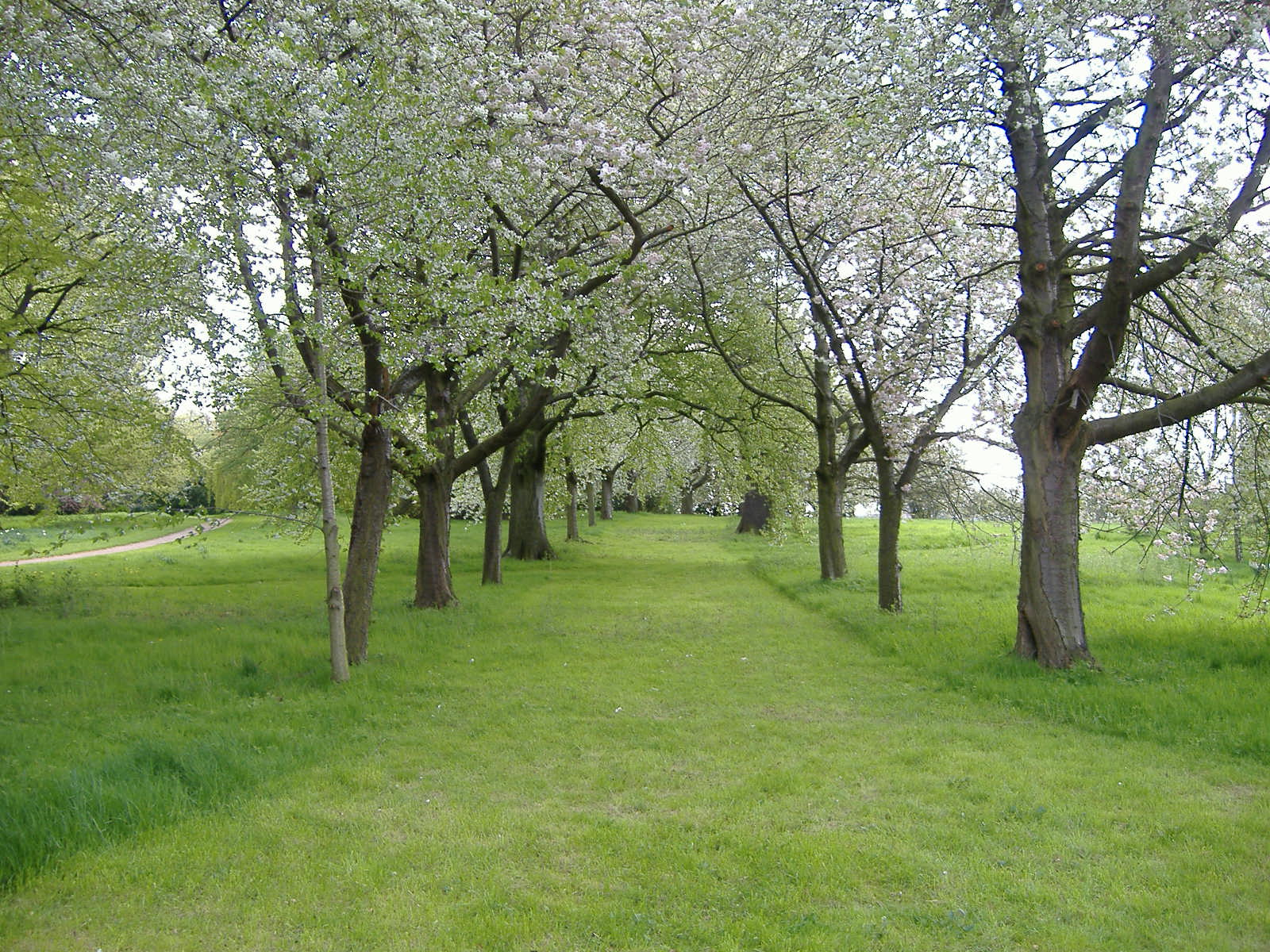
University Park

University Park Campus (52.94°N 1.19°W) is the main campus of the university. A few miles from the centre of Nottingham, the 300-acre (120 ha) site is one of the largest university campuses in the United Kingdom, and home to the majority of the university's 43,561 students. The campus contains 12 halls of residence, of which the largest is Hugh Stewart Hall, as well as academic and administrative buildings. The campus contains 13 listed buildings.

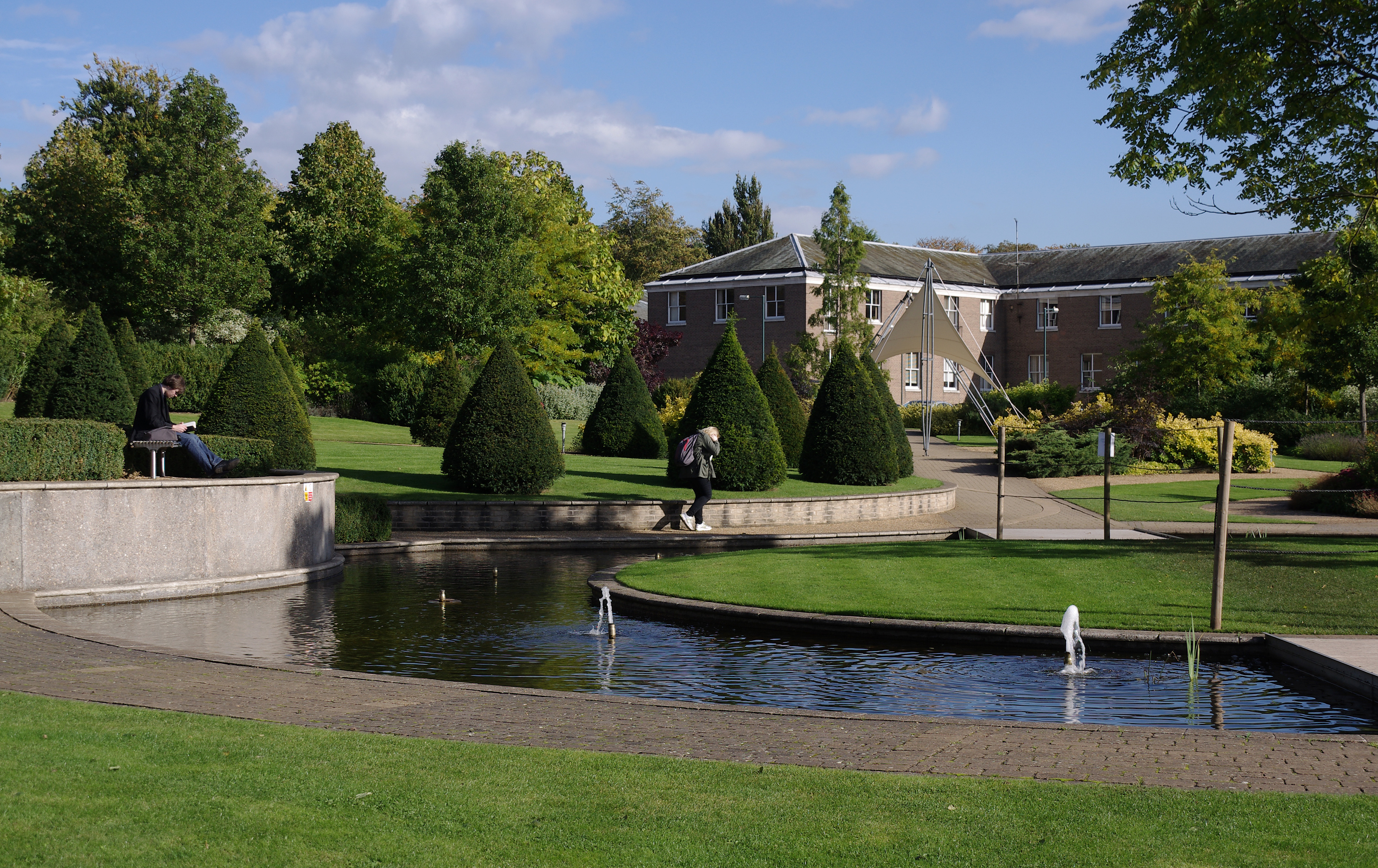
The Millennium Garden

=== Gardens ===
Of particular note are the formal Jekyll Garden, allegedly designed by Gertrude Jekyll, next to Lenton and Wortley Hall; the walled Highfield Garden near the Trent Building, which is home to the national collection of Canna; and the Millennium Garden, formally opened on 4 July 2000. In addition there is extensive planting elsewhere on campus, particularly in lakeside Highfields Park. The campus also has a number of green roofs as part of the Garden in the Sky Project and University wide goal to be more sustainable. These can be found at The Orchard Hotel, Maths Building and George Green library.

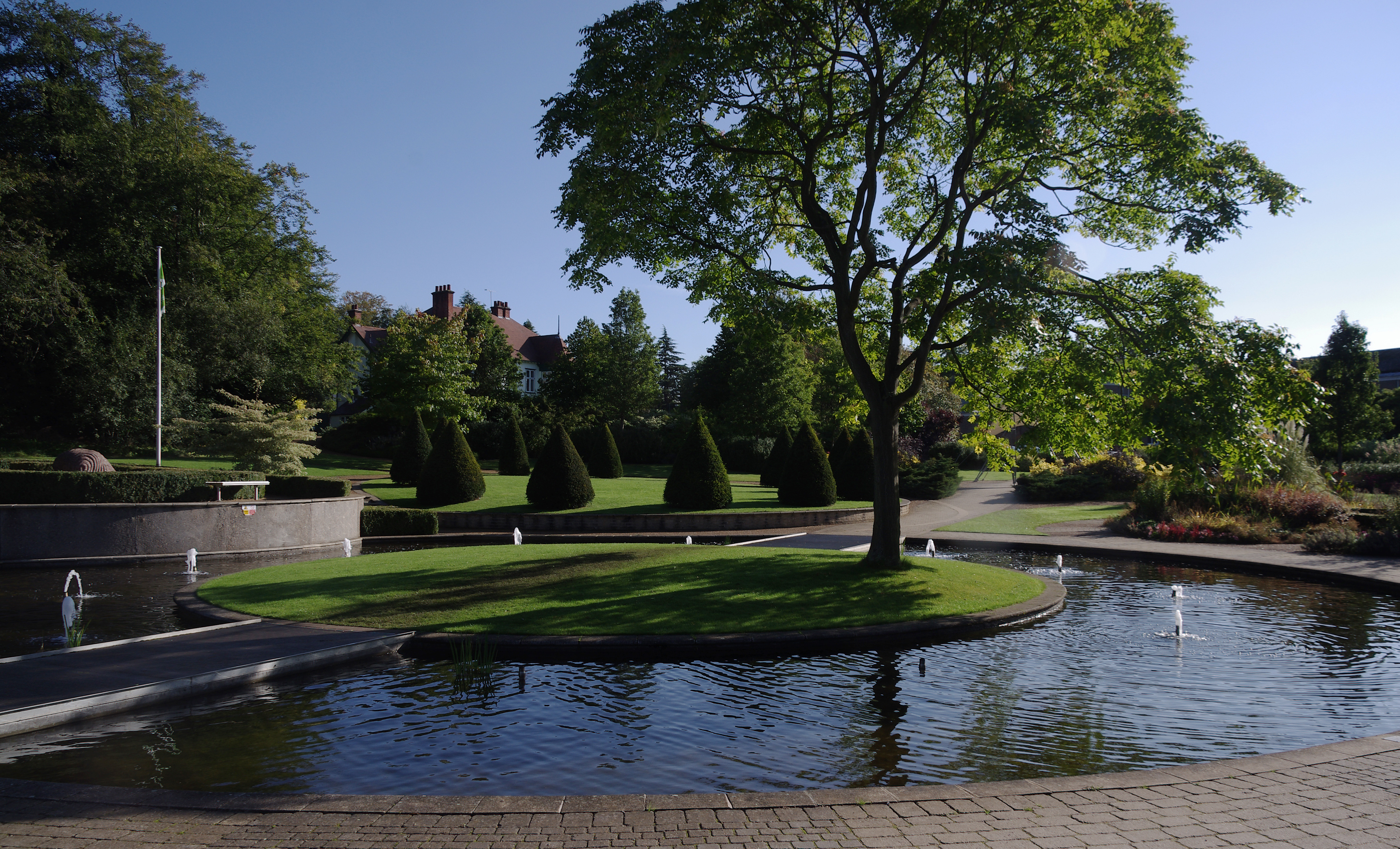
Millennium Garden

=== University Park Campus halls of residence ===
- Ancaster Hall
- Cavendish Hall
- Cripps Hall
- Derby Hall
- Florence Boot Hall
- Hugh Stewart Hall
- Lenton and Wortley Hall
- Lincoln Hall
- Nightingale Hall
- Rutland Hall
- Sherwood Hall
- Willoughby Hall

=== Notable buildings ===
==== Trent Building ====
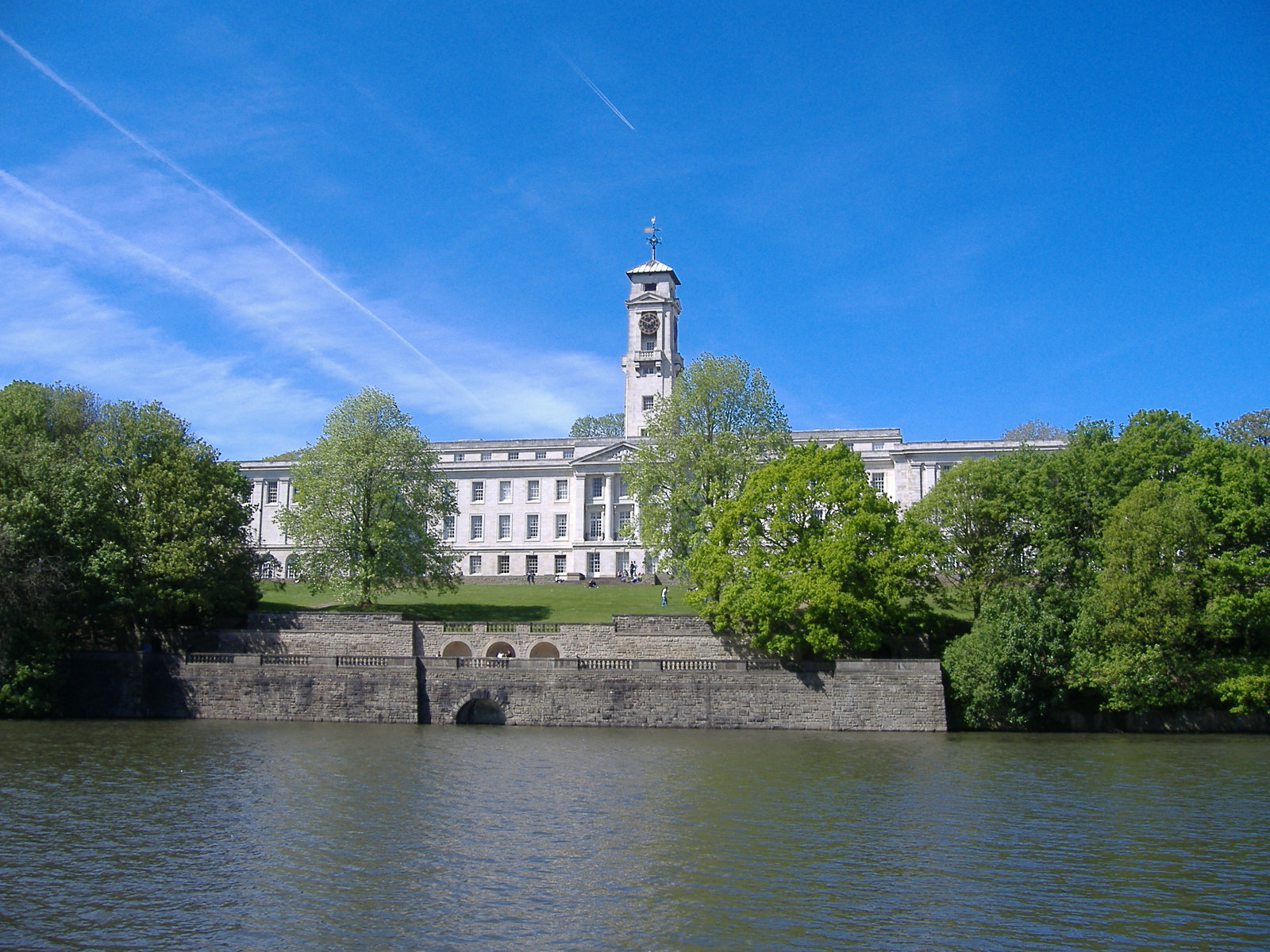
Trent Building

The Trent Building serves as one of the main administrative buildings of the University of Nottingham. It also contains academic facilities, principally for the arts and social sciences.

The foundation stone was laid on 14 June 1922 by Richard Haldane, 1st Viscount Haldane. London architect Morley Horder created the Trent Building in the classical architectural style. The building is topped by a campanile (clock tower), is built of Portland stone and is protected as a grade II listed building. King George V and Queen Mary presided at the building's opening on 10 July 1928.

The building's Great Hall has hosted many distinguished visitors, including Albert Einstein, Mahatma Gandhi and Queen Elizabeth II.

The writer D. H. Lawrence described the building as looking like an "iced cake".

It gained its Trent Building name in 1953 when the adjacent Portland Building was opened.

The main buildings of the university's campuses in China and Malaysia are both modelled on University Park's iconic Trent Building. In the case of the China campus this includes an exact replica of the clock tower.

==== Hallward Library ====
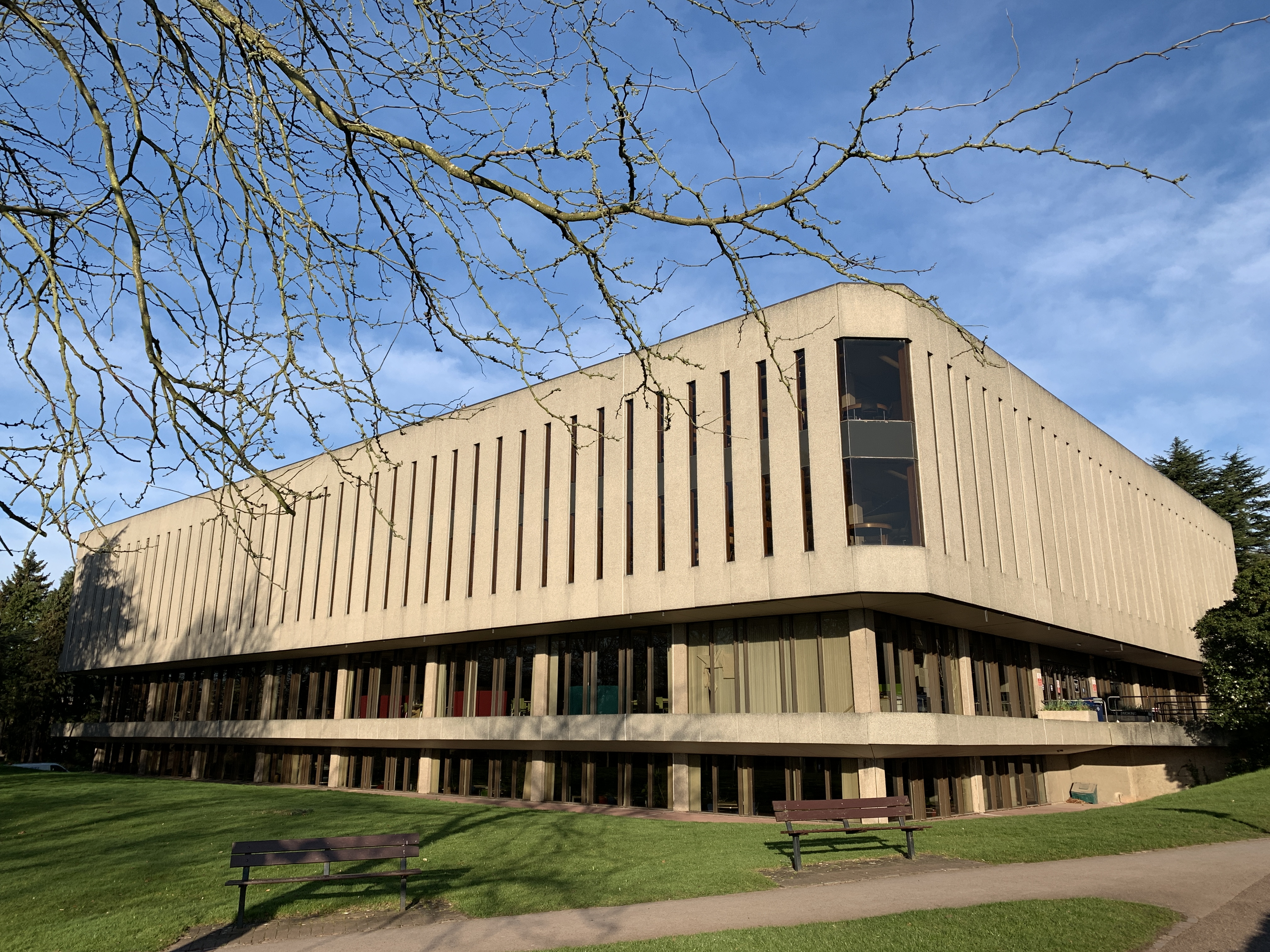
Hallward Library

The Hallward Library is the principal library of the University of Nottingham. It was designed by the architect Harry Faulkner-Brown and won the RIBA East Midlands Regional Award for Architecture prize in 1974. It is named after Dr Bertrand Hallward, first vice-chancellor of the university.

The contractors were W.J. Simms, Sons and Cooke Ltd. Construction started in 1971 and it opened in December 1973. It was designed to hold 500,000 volumes and construction cost £805,000 (equivalent to £8,752,900 in 2025).

It houses the university's arts, humanities, law and social sciences collections and a European Documentation Centre.

==== Portland Building ====
The Portland Building is faced with Portland stone but is actually named after William Arthur Henry Cavendish-Bentinck, 7th Duke of Portland, who was the university's second chancellor.

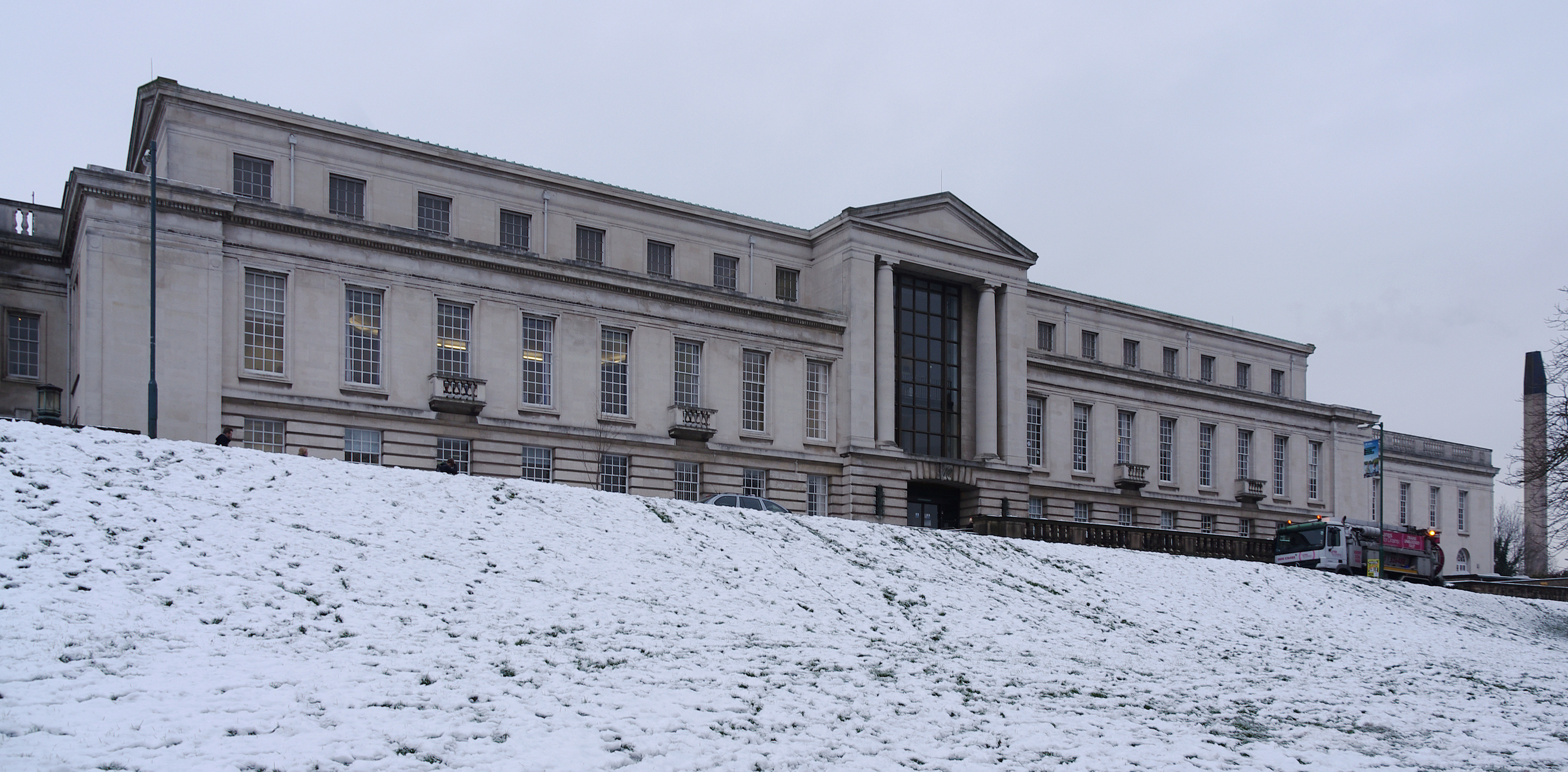
The Portland Building

The plans for the building were drawn up in 1948 but post war restrictions on capital expenditure delayed the start of construction work until March 1953. It was opened by David Maxwell Fyfe, 1st Earl of Kilmuir, Lord Chancellor, on 26 October 1956.

It houses the University of Nottingham Students' Union, Impact magazine, University Radio Nottingham and Nottingham Student Television.

==== Other notable buildings ====
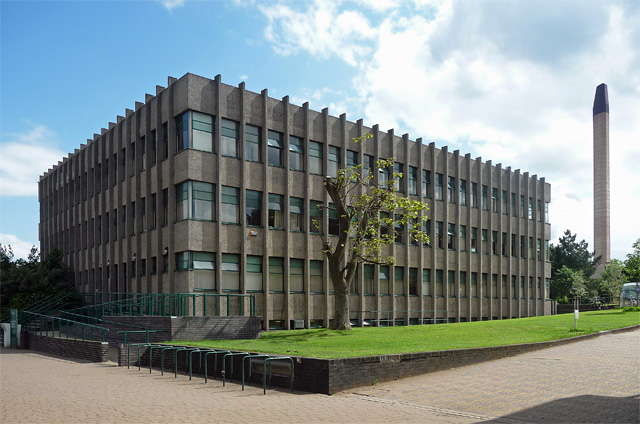
George Green Science Library, Andrew Renton and Associates, 1961-64

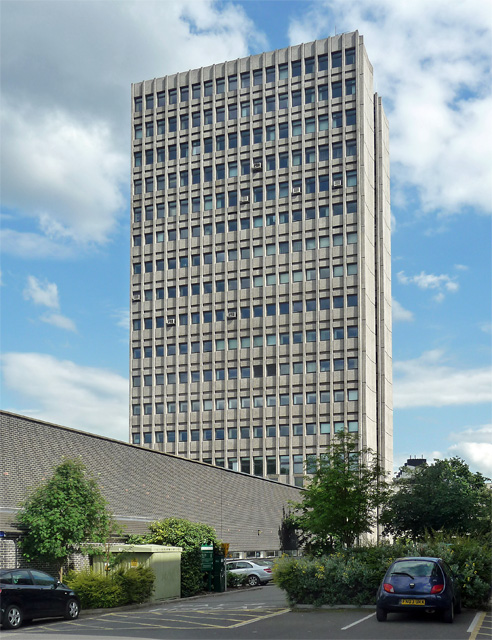
Electrical and Electronic Engineering Department Tower, Andrew Renton and Associates, 1963-65

- Coates Building, architect Basil Spence
- Chemistry Building architect Basil Spence and partners 1961
- Creative Energy Homes
- D.H. Lawrence Lakeside Pavilion, architects Marsh Grochowski 1998-2001
- Djanogly Arts Centre and Recital Hall, architect Graham Brown 1989-92
- East Midlands Conference Centre
- Electrical and Electronic Engineering Department Tower, architects Andrew Renton and Associates, 1963-65
- George Green Science Library, architects Andrew Renton and Associates, 1961–64.
- Highfield House built for Joseph Lowe by architect William Wilkins the Elder, 1797–8. Grade II listed
- Institute for Pharmaceutical Science, architects Pick Everard 1998–99
- Lenton Abbey, for James Green, the superintendent engineer of the Nottingham and Grantham Canal 1798-1800 Grade II listed
- Lenton Eaves, for Benjamin Walker Jnr, a lacemaker, 1875
- Lenton Firs, built 1800 for Thomas Wright Watson a Nottingham hosiery manufacturer, remodelled by Thomas Chambers Hine 1862, Evans and Jolley 1888, and Evans and Son 1904
- Lenton Grove, (Department of History) ca. 1825 for Francis Evans, a Nottingham attorney Grade II listed
- Lenton House, (guest accommodation for the Boots Company) ca. 1800 built for Matthew Needham, a master hosier. Grade II listed
- Lenton House Lodge, ca. 1800. Grade II listed
- Lenton Hurst, built for William Goodacre Player by architects Arthur George Marshall and George Turner, 1896
- Lenton Mount (now University Club), for William Sidney Hemsley, a lace and hosiery manufacturer by architect William Dymock Pratt 1906–07
- Lodges (West and East) by Percy Morley Horder 1932. Both Grade II listed.
- Paton House, originally West Hill House for Samuel Herrick Sands JP by architects Evans and Jolley 1881
- Physics and Mathematics Building architect Basil Spence and partners 1961-63
- Pope Building, architect Basil Spence
- Redcourt, architects Martin and Hardy.
- School of Pharmacy, architects Renton Howard Wood Associates 1967
- Social Sciences and Education building, architect Donald McMorran 1960–61
- The Orchards, for Alfred Thomas Richard, managing director of Imperial Laundry of Radford Boulevard by architect William Dymock Pratt 1904

== Jubilee Campus ==
Jubilee Campus (52.9529°N 1.1872°W) primarily houses the School of Education, the School of Computer Science, and the Nottingham University Business School. The campus is also the location of the National College for School Leadership and the university's Global Engagement Office.

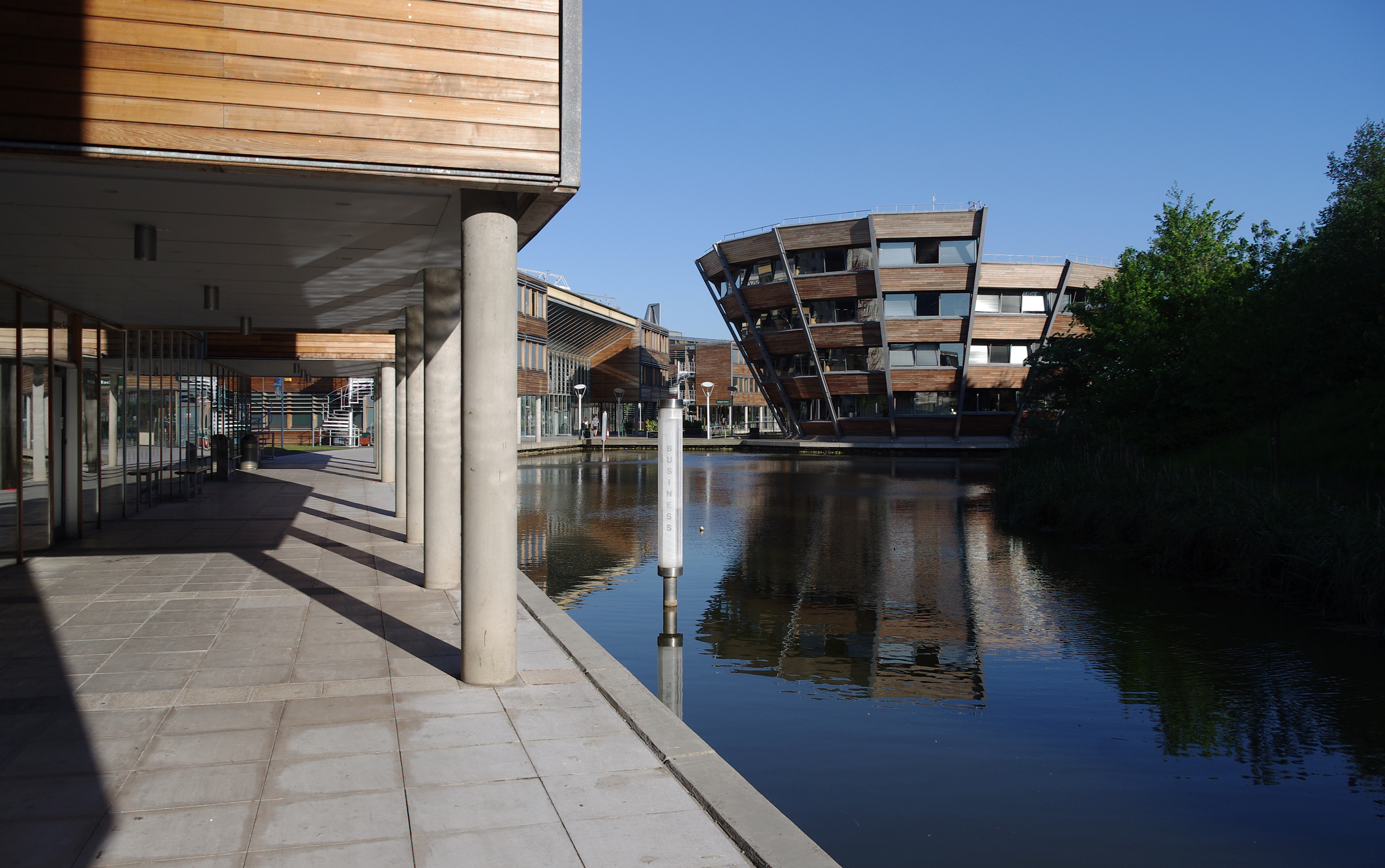
Jubilee Campus. On the right is The Sir Harry and Lady Djanogly Learning Resource Centre.

The campus opened in 1999, and is located about a mile to the east of the main University Park Campus on the site of the former Raleigh Bicycle Company factory. The campus plan and the buildings for first phase of the campus were designed by the architects Michael Hopkins and Partners following selection through an architectural design competition managed by RIBA Competitions and won the 2000 BCI Award for "Building of the Year" and the 2001 RIBA Journal Sustainability Award. The campus name derives from the fact that 1998 was the Golden Jubilee of the granting of the Royal Charter that made the university an independent degree-granting organisation.

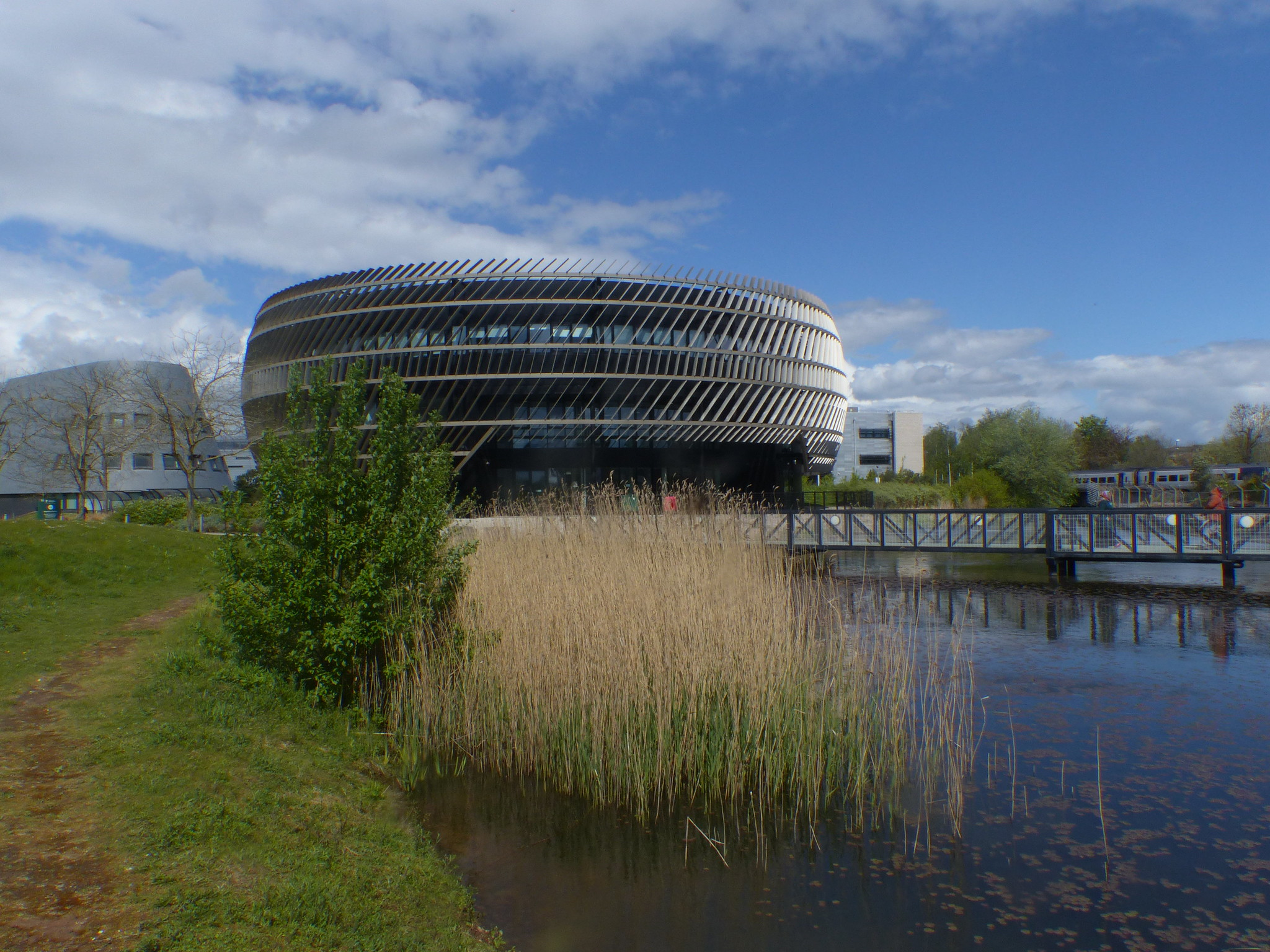
Ingenuity Centre, Jubilee Campus

Like the University Park Campus Jubilee has been constructed around an artificial lake and with similar green surroundings. The Hopkins buildings also contains many innovative environmental elements such as living roofs (Sedum) aiding storm drainage, insulation and promoting biodiversity, and solar panels. Particularly striking is the library, the Sir Harry and Lady Djanogly Learning Resource Centre, a circular building situated in the middle of the lake with only one, spiraling, floor.

For the second phase of the campus, Make Architects were retained by the university. They produced a revised campus plan, which moved away from Hopkins' north–south orientation, and creates an east–west axis beyond the confines of the site. The first stage includes a group of three prominent buildings by the practice.

The new plan is centred on the Aspire sculpture, designed by Make Architects, which was the country's tallest piece of free-standing art until the construction of Orbit in 2012.

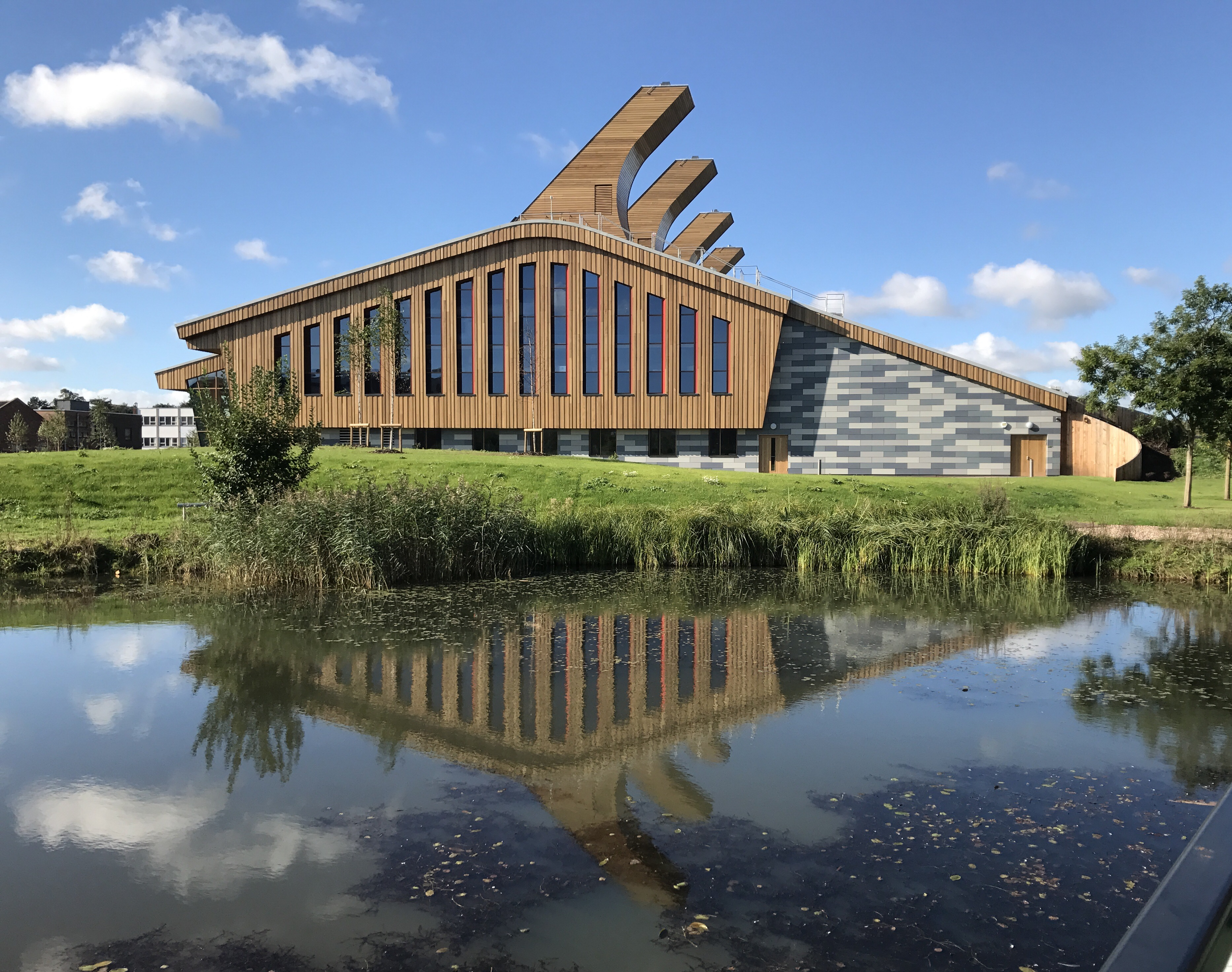
GlaxoSmithKline carbon neutral building at the Jubilee Campus, University of Nottingham

International House and the Amenity Building have facades in multiple shades of red terracotta, whereas the Gateway Building is covered in galvanized zinc shingles. Critical reception to Make's buildings for the second phase has been mixed. The new campus buildings were runner up for Building Design magazine's 2009 Carbuncle Cup.

The GlaxoSmithKline Carbon Neutral Laboratory for Sustainable Chemistry is the UK's first carbon neutral laboratory. The lab is built from natural materials and opened on 27 February 2017. During the construction of the lab a large fire broke out on 12 September 2014 and burnt the building down, resulting in a delay of completion.

=== Jubilee Campus halls of residence ===
- Newark Hall – undergraduate, 400 students
- Southwell Hall – undergraduate, 200 students
- Melton Hall – postgraduate, 140 students

Each of the above halls are ensuite, and Southwell and Newark are catered. Many students studying on the main campus live in halls on Jubilee. Transport between campuses is provided by a university-funded bus.

=== Gallery ===
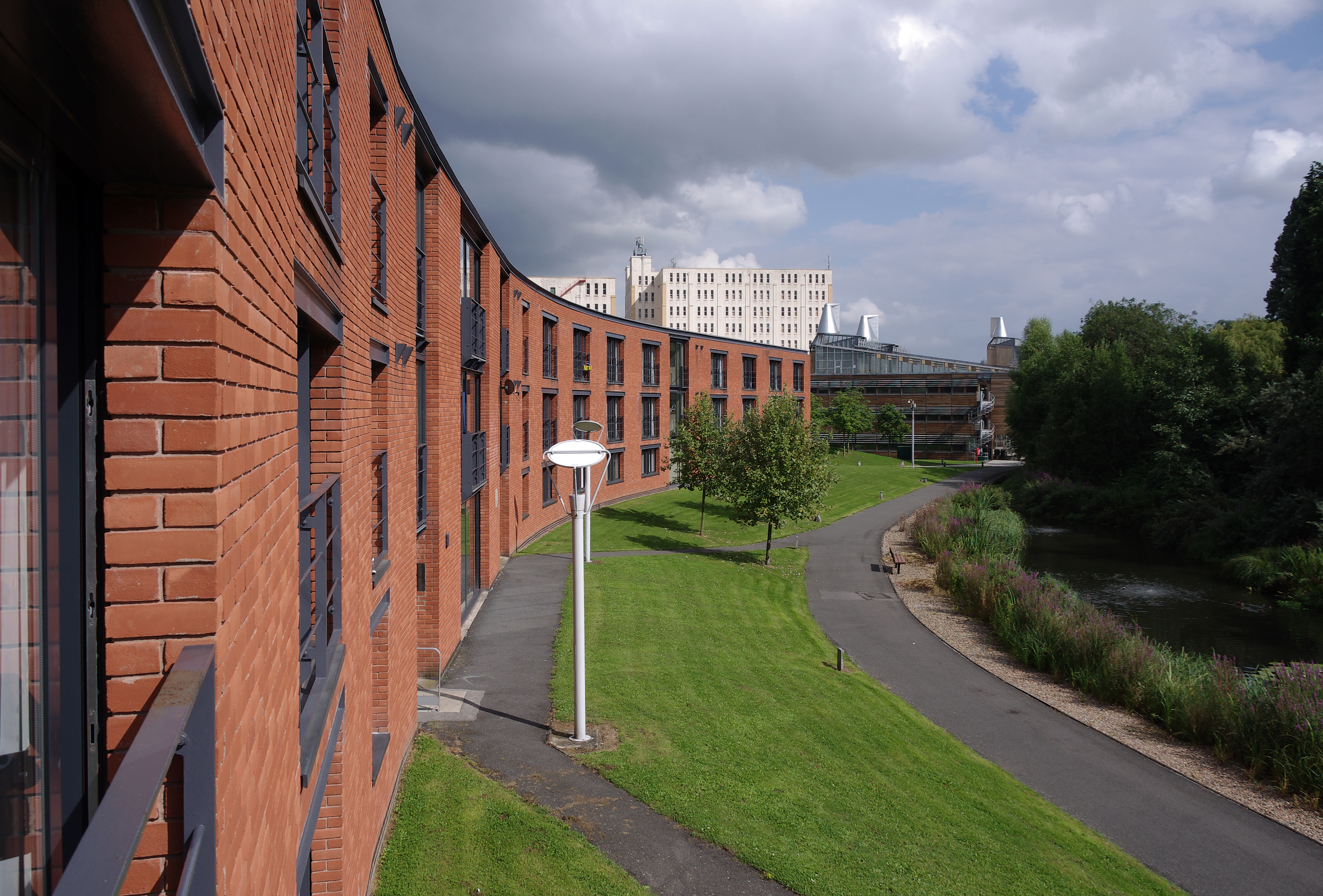
Melton Halls of residence

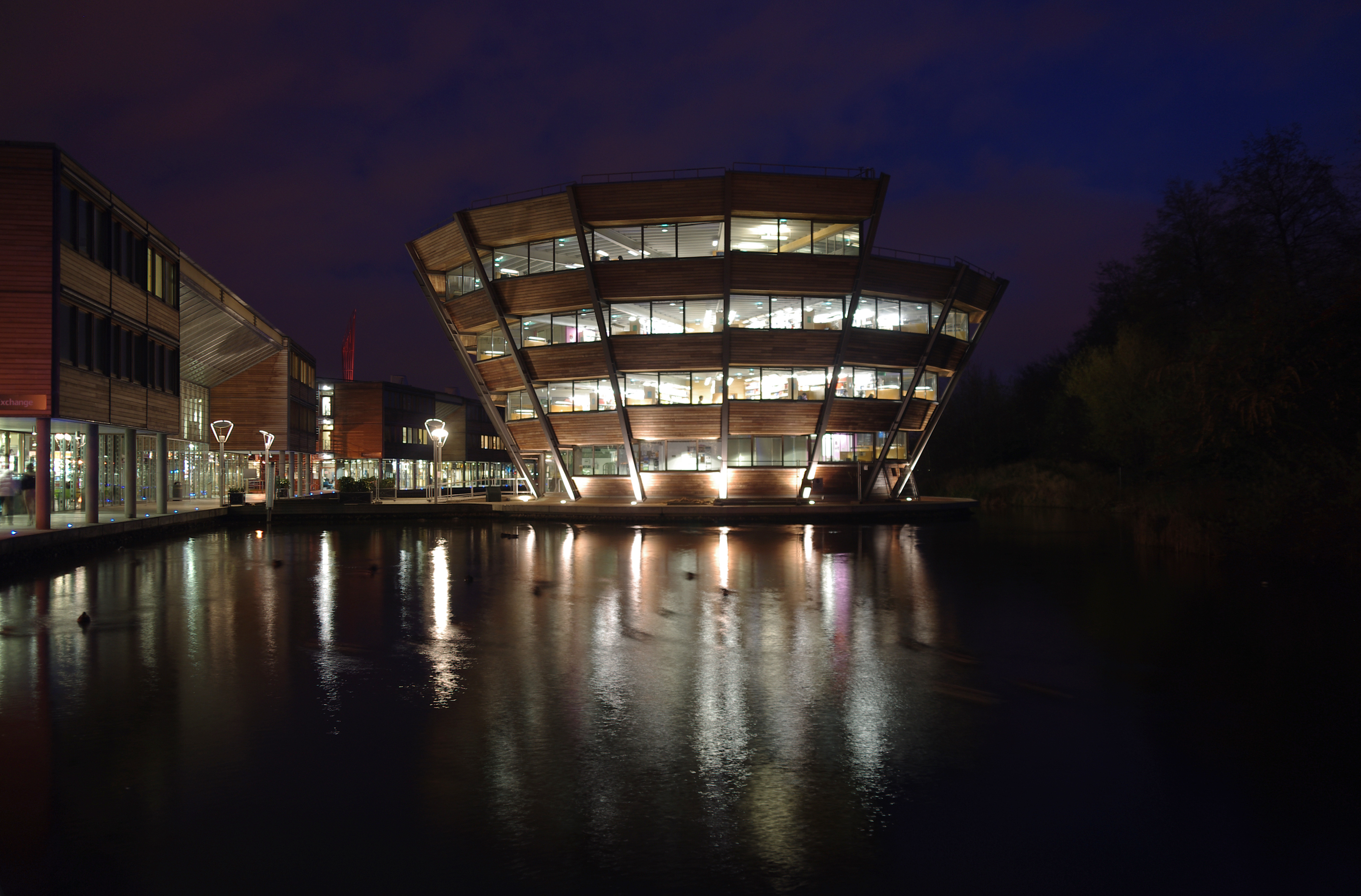
Sir Harry and Lady Djanogly Learning Resource Centre

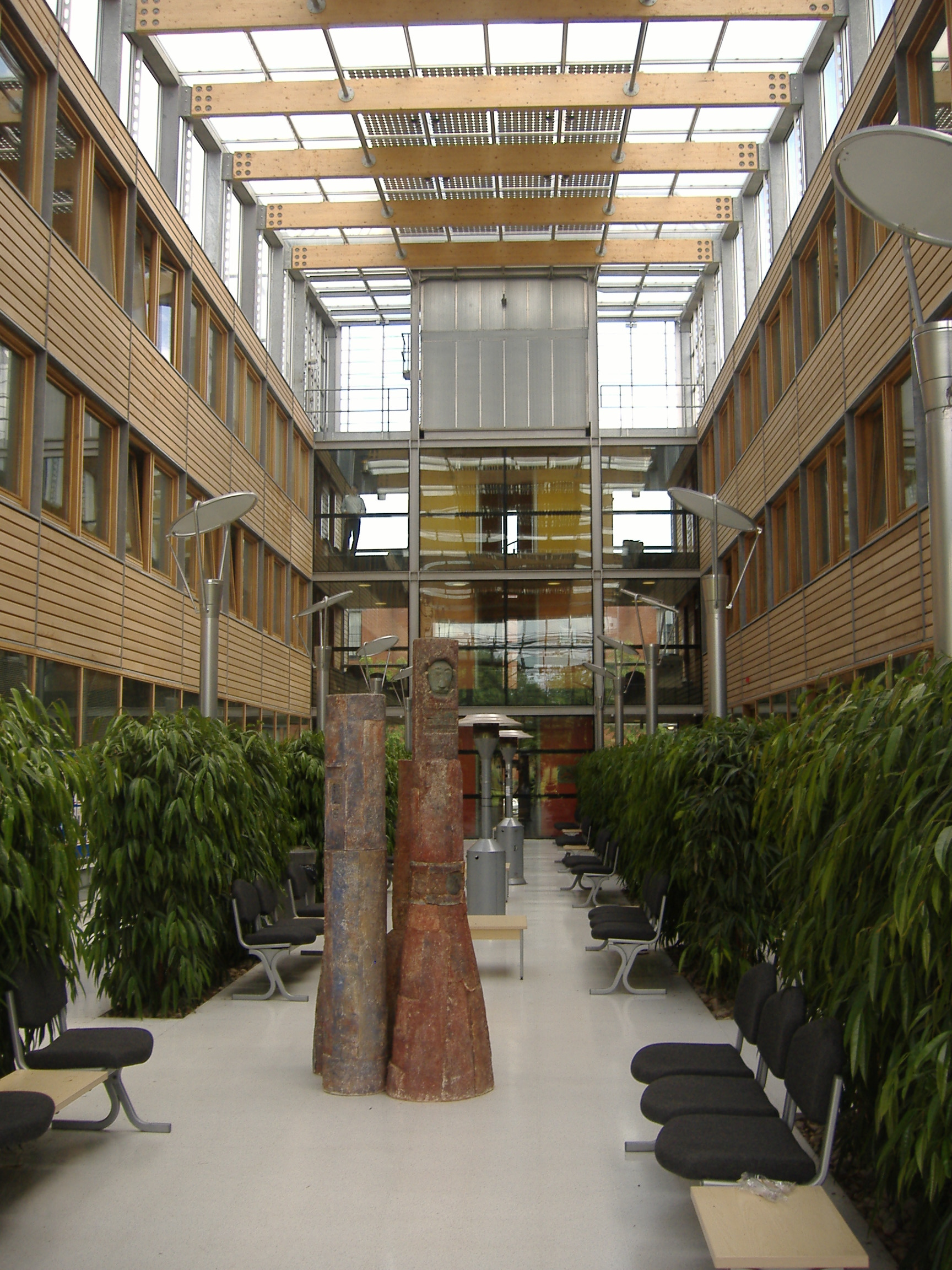
Dearing Building, interior

== King's Meadow Campus ==
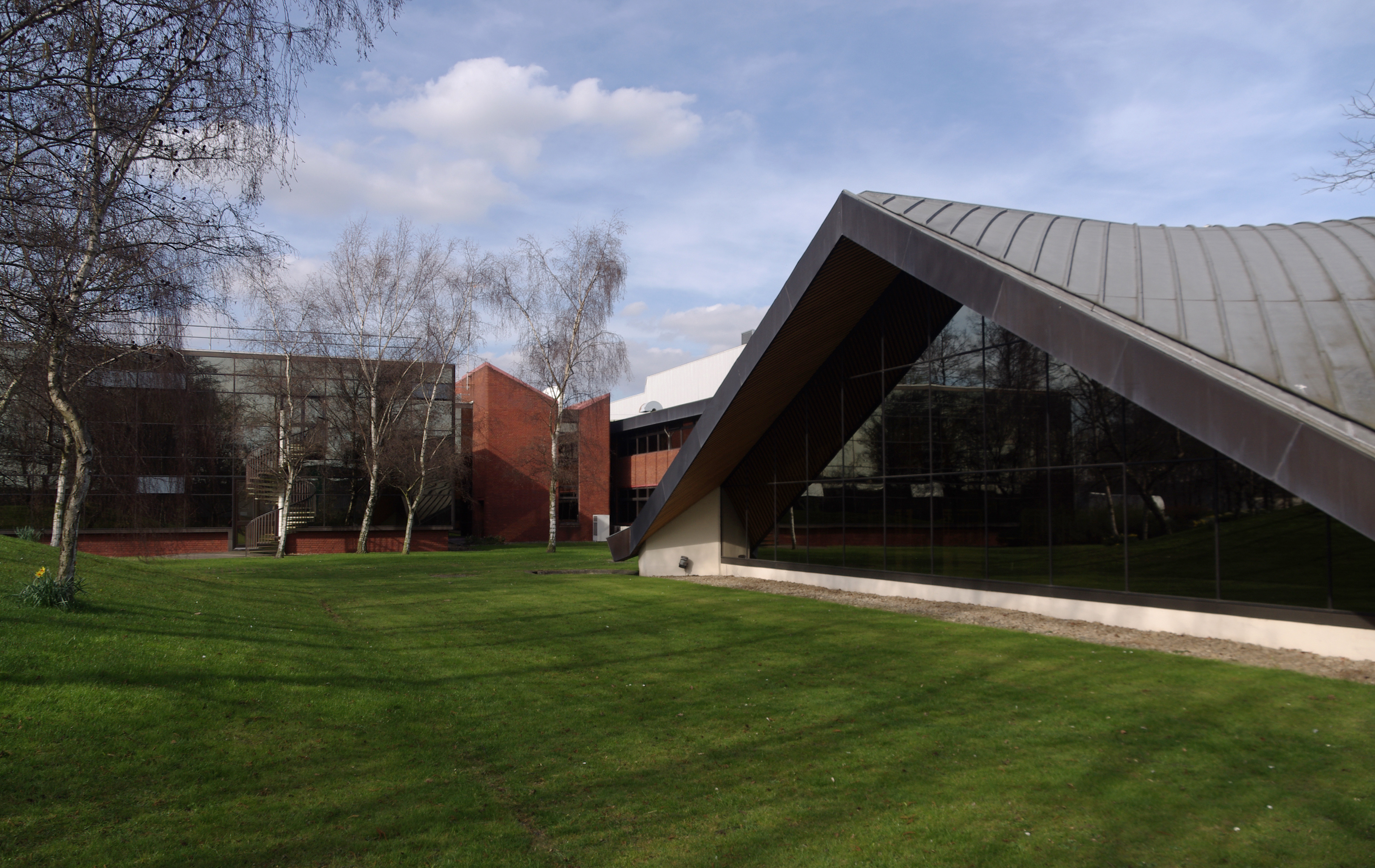
The main building on King's Meadow Campus.

King's Meadow Campus (52.9386°N 1.1719°W) is a 16 acres (64,750 m^{2}) campus that was formerly the East Midlands studios of Carlton Central. The university's department of Manuscripts and Special Collections is now housed at the King's Meadow Campus. Information Services, Human Resources and much of the Finance Department are now also housed at this site.

== Sutton Bonington Campus ==
Coat of Arms

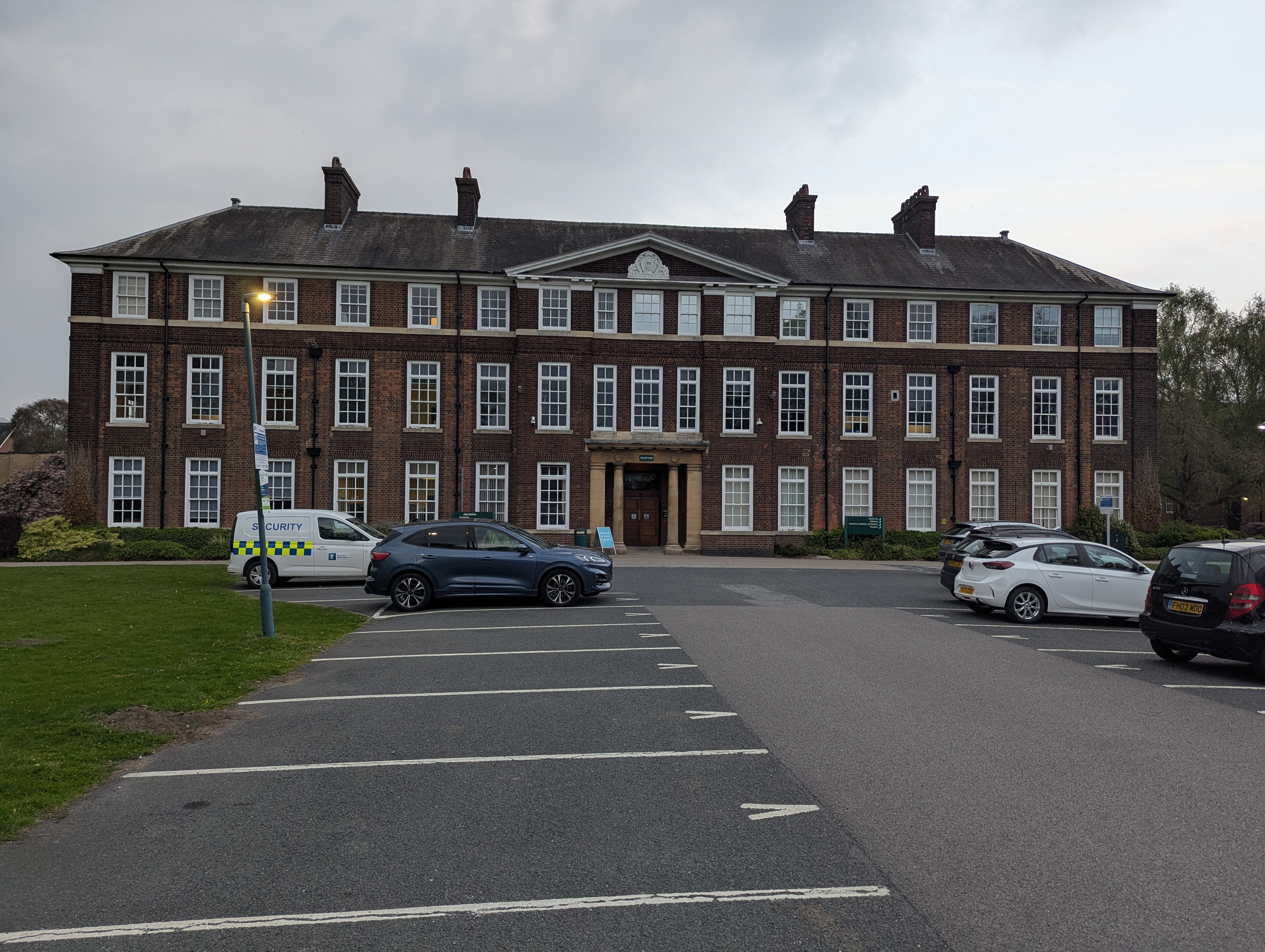
The front of the main (original) building of the Sutton Bonington Campus, which was once an agricultural and dairy college.

The Sutton Bonington Campus,(52.8302°N 1.2524°W) formerly the Midlands Agricultural and Dairy College, became part of the University of Nottingham in 1947. It houses the school of biosciences and the school of veterinary medicine and science. The campus is a 420-hectare (1,000-acre) site in a rural location near Sutton Bonington village, 12 miles (19 km) south of the main, University Park Campus and 1 mile (1.6 km) from junction 24 of the M1 motorway. The campus has its own coat of arms and motto: Aras, Seris, Metis (Plough, Sow, Reap). The campus contains research buildings and teaching facilities, a large library and is also home to Bonington Halls, the university's largest hall of residence, which accommodates around 650 students. A 400-hectare (990-acre) commercial farm, University Farm, and a dairy are also part of the site.

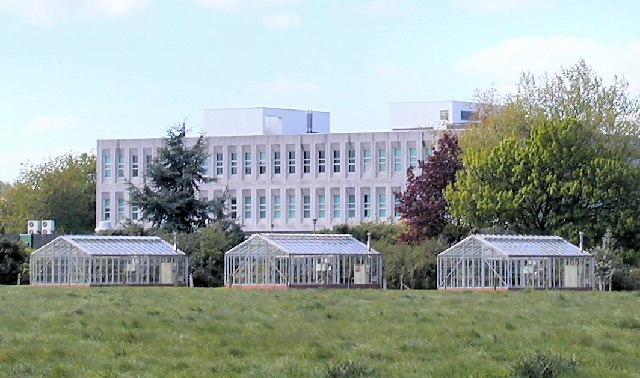
University of Nottingham School of Agriculture

The Barn, a student amenities building which opened in 2014, accommodates the student bar, student service centre, refectory, graduate school hub, faith spaces and a private dining room. There is also a cafe, 'The Mulberry Tree', shop and two cashpoint machines on campus.

Sports facilities on the campus include a gym, a sports hall, and an astro-turf pitch. External sports facilities run alongside the university between the main road and the railway line. There is also a music room available to students in the music society and a bouldering wall available to students in the climbing club.

The Midlands Agricultural and Dairy College was originally located in Kingston on Soar, about a two-minute walk down the road from the current campus, but relocated to its current location after the First World War. The site (which had been built but not yet occupied prior to the war) was used as a prisoner-of-war camp during the First World War.

=== Student organisations ===
The Sutton Bonington Campus is the home of the Sutton Bonington Students' Union Guild, an association of the University of Nottingham Students' Union. All officers of the 'SB Guild' are non-sabbatical and elected annually by an anonymous ballot, which follows the Students' Union procedure of using STV. The Guild used to be separate from the union, and still has a degree of independence. The Guild run 40 of its own clubs and societies. In addition it also has its own international students organisation (ISSB). Societies at Sutton Bonington Campus are student-run and apply directly to the Guild for funding- they are also separate from the main university societies in many cases.

The old students association for both the campus, and the hall of residence is known as OKA (the Old Kingstonian Association, the name pre-dating the move to Sutton Bonington), and its members include both students from the Midlands Agricultural and Dairy College, and from the university. OKA produces a publication known as Agrimag annually (and has done so since at least the 1920s, when it was called the M.A.D.C Magazine). OKA organises a reunion weekend on the third weekend in November every year for recently graduated students to return.

=== Bonington Student Village ===
Bonington Student Village is the name given by the current provider to the University's halls of residence at Sutton Bonington. It is a mixed sex group of houses and halls, holding both undergraduates and postgraduates, of varying age and design holding between eight and sixty people. Bonington Student Village houses approximately 650 students and is managed by Campus Living Villages (CLV). The houses and halls at Sutton Bonington are named after local villages and are as follows:

- Kingston
- Normanton
- Wymeswold
- Ratcliffe
- Rempstone
- Kegworth
- Dishley
- Hathern
- Lockington
- Zouch
- Stanford
- Barton
- Costock
- Thrumpton

=== School of Veterinary Medicine and Science ===
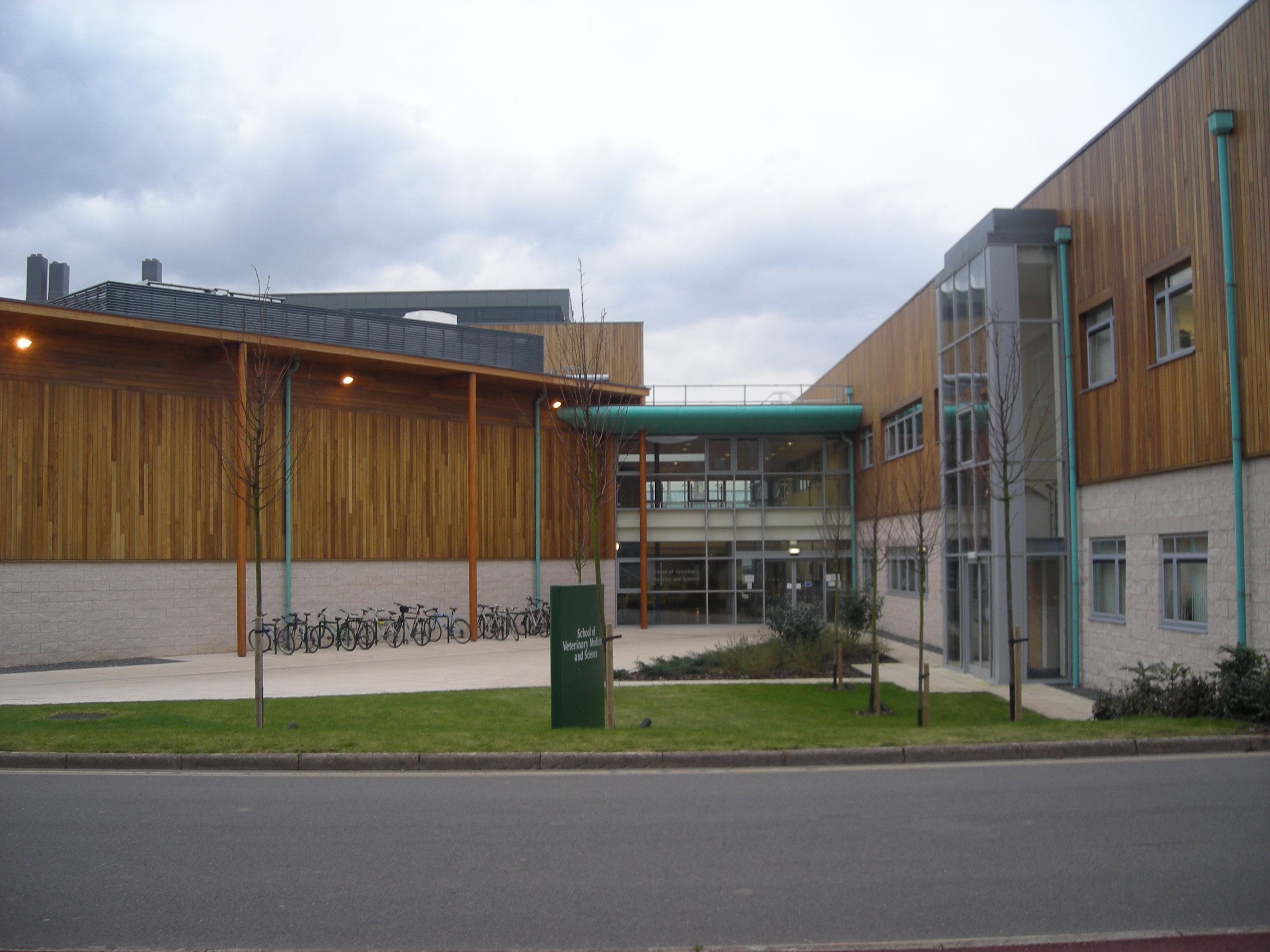
The School of Veterinary Medicine and Science

At the time of development on the campus (opened 2006), the Nottingham Vet School was the first brand new, purpose-built veterinary school in the UK for over 50 years. The academic staff of the School work within 5 strategic research areas: Infection and Immunity; Population Health and Welfare; Comparative Medicine; Reproductive Biology and Veterinary Educational Research. Research is closely aligned with that in the School of Biosciences with whom some research facilities and equipment are shared. The involvement of Clinical Associates and other organisations within the research programs enables the identification of clinical problems in the field and the rapid application of investigational science to these problems in both production and companion animal species. The Foundation Dean and Head of School is Professor Gary England.

=== School of Biosciences ===
The School of Biosciences (previously School of Agriculture and briefly the School of Biological Sciences) predates the School of Veterinary Medicine and Science on the Sutton Bonington Campus by several decades. Current strengths lie in soil and root biology, plant science and microbiology. The School has 95 academic staff, 925 undergraduate students and 300 post-graduate students, The School houses five divisions:

- Division of Agricultural and Environmental Sciences
- Division of Animal Science
- Division of Food, Nutrition and Dietetics
- Division of Microbiology, Brewing and Biotechnology
- Division of Plant and Crop Sciences

The Head of School is Professor Sacha Mooney. Past Heads of School include Paul Wilson, Simon Langley-Evans, Neil Crout, Katherine Smart, Jerry Roberts, Robert Webb, Don Grierson and Peter Buttery. Langley-Evans had a particularly notable tenure which featured a number of reforms which resulted in a reorganisation of the Divisional structure of the School and a radical change in the diversity of the academic staff. The latter included a significant increase in the number of women and people of colour achieving associate professor and professorial appointments in the School.

Notable past and current staff include John Monteith, Keith Campbell (biologist), Malcolm J. Bennett, Edward Cocking, Stephen E. Harding, Brian Heap and Joanne Hort. Well known alumni include Isobel Pooley.

=== University Farm ===
The farm exists to provide facilities, resources and opportunities for research with crops and animals. It also has a key educational role by providing an environment for effective tuition of students in Biosciences, and Veterinary science. The farm is run commercially to be self-financing whilst still fulfilling its role as a teaching and research resource.

=== History ===
The first foundations of the current site at Sutton Bonington date back to the founding of the Midland Dairy Institute in the mid-19th century. The institute gave lectures and short coursers in such subjects as butter and cheese production, the institute had no fixed home but instead toured the various agricultural shows in the area. University College Nottingham was founded in 1877, and in 1892 co-operated with Nottingham County Council in establishing an agricultural department. Then in 1895 the Midland Dairy Institute in conjunction with the five County Councils of Nottingham, Derby, Leicester, Kesteven and Lindsey, agreed to join forces, in an effort to provide both theoretical and practical instruction in agriculture, and especially dairying. Lord Belper leased, to the united body his Fields Farm at Kingston, consisting of 176 acres (0.71 km^{2}) of land, half being in permanent grass, and half arable, to act as a permanent base for the institute. In 1900 the agricultural department of Nottingham University College was combined with the Dairy institute at Kingston, and additional buildings were erected shortly afterwards. In 1905 the institute changed its name to the Midland Agricultural and Dairy College.

In 1912 another farm of 85 acres (340,000 m^{2}), situated in Sutton Bonington parish, but near to the Kegworth Station, was acquired. Initially intended for an experimental station. It however became apparent that the institute was rapidly running out of space, and construction of a brand new purpose-built site at Sutton Bonington began. The construction of the new site had not been completed before the outbreak of the First World War, and the new buildings were appropriated by the government to house German prisoners of war. The college did not regain the site at Sutton Bonington until 1919 and did not fully transfer to the new site until 1928. During the 1930s the college started to offer degree level courses in association with University College Nottingham and London University. As the Second World War started the college was once again appropriated, this time to be used as a training centre for the Women's Land Army (WLA). After a year, however, it was decided that it was unnecessary to provide this level of training, and the college was returned to its original purpose.

In 1947–48 the college merged with Nottingham University College, to form the new Nottingham University (which was granted its charter in 1948), Sutton Bonington was initially home to two of the university's six faculties (Agriculture and Horticulture). This move was part of a major shift in the teaching of agricultural sciences in the region. Each of the original local authorities set up their own agricultural college to teach practical agriculture:

- Brackenhurst College, Nottinghamshire (now part of Nottingham Trent University)
- Broomfield College, Derbyshire (now part of Derby College)
- Brooksby College, Leicestershire (now part of Brooksby-Melton College)
- Caythorpe College, Kesteven (closed 2001)
- Riseholme College, Lindsey (now part of Lincoln University),

In the meantime the new faculties at Sutton Bonington quickly phased out practical courses and instead focused on academic research and graduate and post-graduate teaching. It was initially intended that the new colleges would feed their brightest and most able students into the new university.

The site at Sutton Bonington continued to grow during the latter part of the 20th century, during this period the two initial faculties were merged into one: the faculty of Agricultural and Food Sciences. The end of the 20th century saw the faculty initially merged with the faculty of Biology to form the School of Biology. This was a short-lived experiment which many staff have reported failed due to poor leadership and logistical challenges. Shortly after the purchase of the new Jubilee Campus, the school was split into the School of Life Sciences (based at University Park) and the School of Biosciences (based at Sutton Bonington). Some elements of the School of Biosciences (Environmental Science) retained space at the University Park Campus as their degree courses were delivered at that site. This period also saw the construction of new Plant and Food science buildings at Sutton Bonington.

2006 saw the opening of the School of Veterinary Medicine and Science on the campus, in brand new purpose-built buildings. This was the first new vet school in the UK for over 50 years, and was seen to be part of the government's response to the 2001 foot and mouth epidemic. Controversially, the building of the new school was partly funded by leasing out the halls of residence, catering facilities, bar and shop, to private companies (CRM and Sodexo).

Extensive building and renovation programmes on the site heavily remodelled the campus between 2010 and 2020. New buildings included the Gateway Building (housing the staff of the Division of Agricultural and Environmental Sciences, and the Vet School), the Brewing and Bioenergy Building (including the research brewery of the multinational brewer AbInbev), The Barn (a student hub, housing the refectory and student services administration) and The Firs (animal research facility). At the time of construction, The Gateway was the largest straw built building in Europe, having been constructed using straw obtained from the University Farm. The 1960s North Laboratory building was extensively refurbished to house a new teaching laboratory facility (the Peter Buttery Laboratory) and the staff of the Division of Food, Nutrition and Dietetics. Expansion of the School of Veterinary Medicine and Science has prompted the construction of new clinical teaching areas and a mock veterinary practice on the campus in 2022/23.

=== Sutton Bonington weather station ===
Since 1908 Sutton Bonington has had an official (Met Office listed) automatic weather monitoring station situated on the university campus. The station is at 48m ASL just off Landcroft Lane at 52.8282°N 1.2485°W.

==== Climate ====
The warmest month is July, with an average high of just over 22 °C, whilst the coldest month is January, with a temperature range of 1.9 °C to 7.5 °C. Maximum and minimum temperatures throughout the year are around the England average. The highest temperature recorded at Sutton Bonington was 39.4 °C on 19 July 2022. Frost occurs typically between November and April, with an average of 42 days a year with frost recorded. The sunniest months are July, May and August (in that order).

The average annual rainfall is about 630 millimetres (25 in), with October to January being the wettest period although June is the wettest month, compared with the national average of 870 millimetres (34 in). The driest months are March, February and April (in that order).

Below are average temperature and rainfall figures taken between 1991 and 2020 for the official weather station at the Sutton Bonington campus itself.

Climate data for Sutton Bonington (Note: Weather station is located 9.0 miles (14.5 km) from the Nottingham city centre, and 11.1 miles (17.9 km) from the Derby city centre.), 48 m (157 ft) amsl; 1991–2020 normals, extremes 1924–present
Month	Jan	Feb	Mar	Apr	May	Jun	Jul	Aug	Sep	Oct	Nov	Dec	Year
Record high °C (°F)	15.8 (60.4)	17.9 (64.2)	22.9 (73.2)	26.5 (79.7)	32.3 (90.1)	32.2 (90.0)	39.4 (102.9)	34.8 (94.6)	30.9 (87.6)	28.8 (83.8)	20.0 (68.0)	15.9 (60.6)	39.4 (102.9)
Mean daily maximum °C (°F)	7.5 (45.5)	8.1 (46.6)	10.5 (50.9)	13.6 (56.5)	16.7 (62.1)	19.6 (67.3)	22.0 (71.6)	21.8 (71.2)	18.7 (65.7)	14.5 (58.1)	10.4 (50.7)	7.8 (46.0)	14.3 (57.7)
Daily mean °C (°F)	4.7 (40.5)	5.0 (41.0)	6.8 (44.2)	9.1 (48.4)	11.9 (53.4)	14.9 (58.8)	17.1 (62.8)	17.0 (62.6)	14.4 (57.9)	11.0 (51.8)	7.4 (45.3)	4.9 (40.8)	10.3 (50.5)
Mean daily minimum °C (°F)	1.9 (35.4)	1.9 (35.4)	3.0 (37.4)	4.6 (40.3)	7.2 (45.0)	10.1 (50.2)	12.1 (53.8)	12.2 (54.0)	10.1 (50.2)	7.5 (45.5)	4.4 (39.9)	2.1 (35.8)	6.5 (43.7)
Record low °C (°F)	−16.7 (1.9)	−17.8 (0.0)	−13.3 (8.1)	−6.7 (19.9)	−4.4 (24.1)	−1.1 (30.0)	1.7 (35.1)	1.1 (34.0)	−1.8 (28.8)	−6.7 (19.9)	−9.9 (14.2)	−15.3 (4.5)	−17.8 (0.0)
Average precipitation mm (inches)	50.7 (2.00)	41.2 (1.62)	40.6 (1.60)	44.3 (1.74)	46.3 (1.82)	63.7 (2.51)	61.8 (2.43)	54.6 (2.15)	49.2 (1.94)	62.7 (2.47)	56.9 (2.24)	58.1 (2.29)	630.0 (24.80)
Average precipitation days (≥ 1.0 mm)	10.9	9.6	9.6	9.6	8.9	9.5	9.6	8.6	8.9	10.4	11.0	11.7	118.3
Mean monthly sunshine hours	51.6	76.1	115.6	152.0	182.9	161.8	190.1	175.6	136.7	100.8	61.5	47.7	1,452.4
Source 1: Met Office
Source 2: Starlings Roost Weather

=== Gallery ===
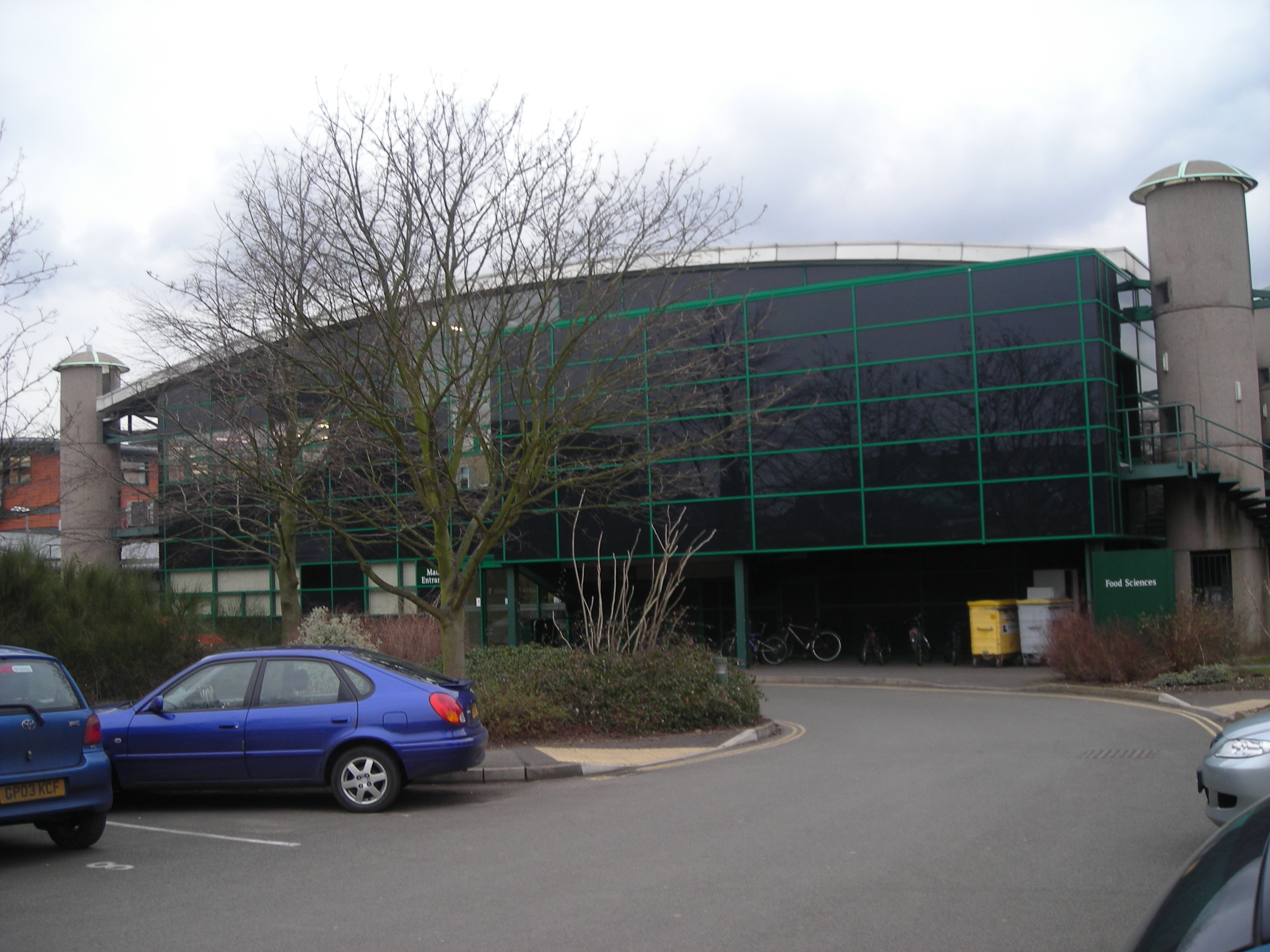
The Food Sciences Building

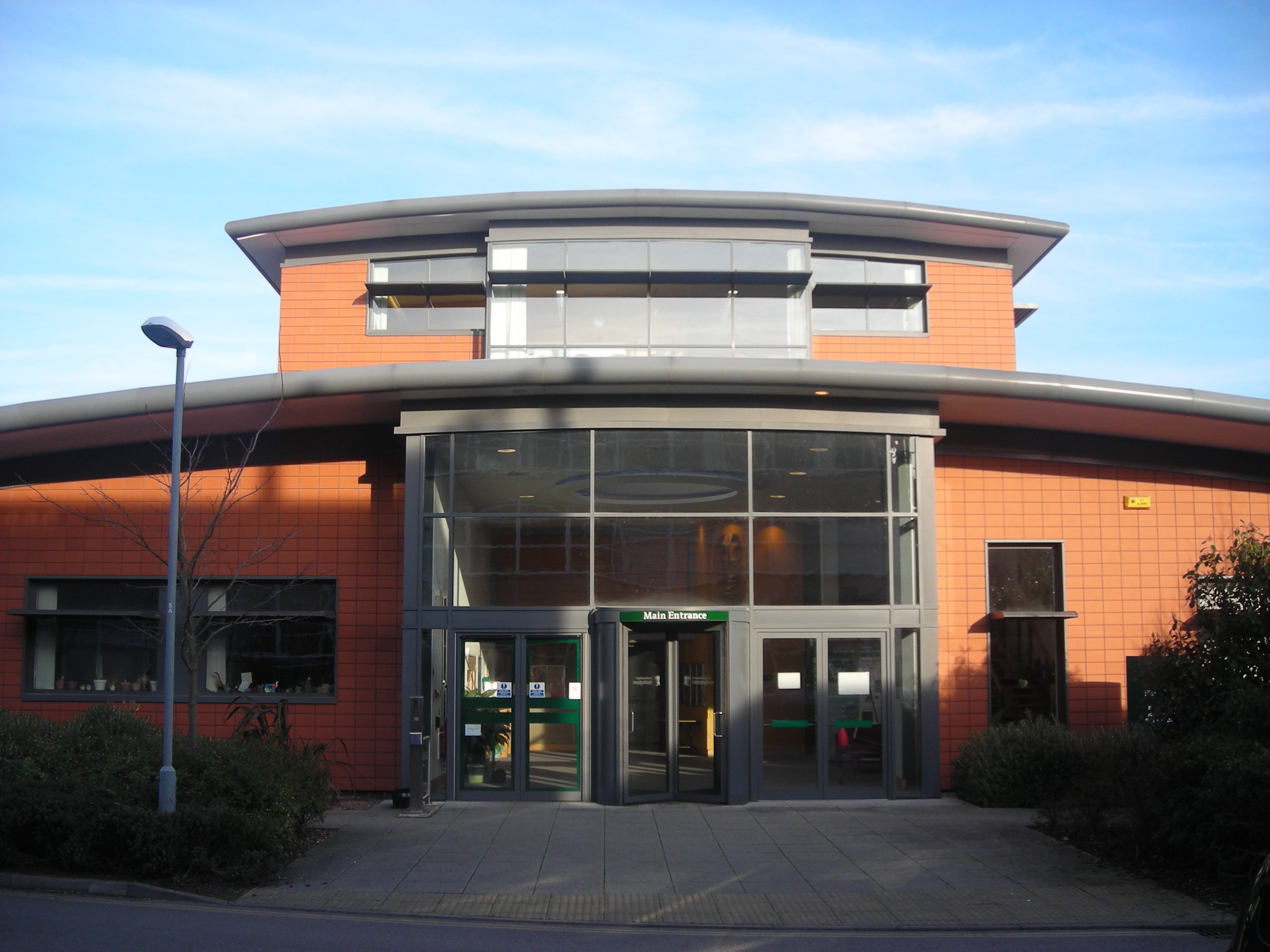
Plant Sciences Building

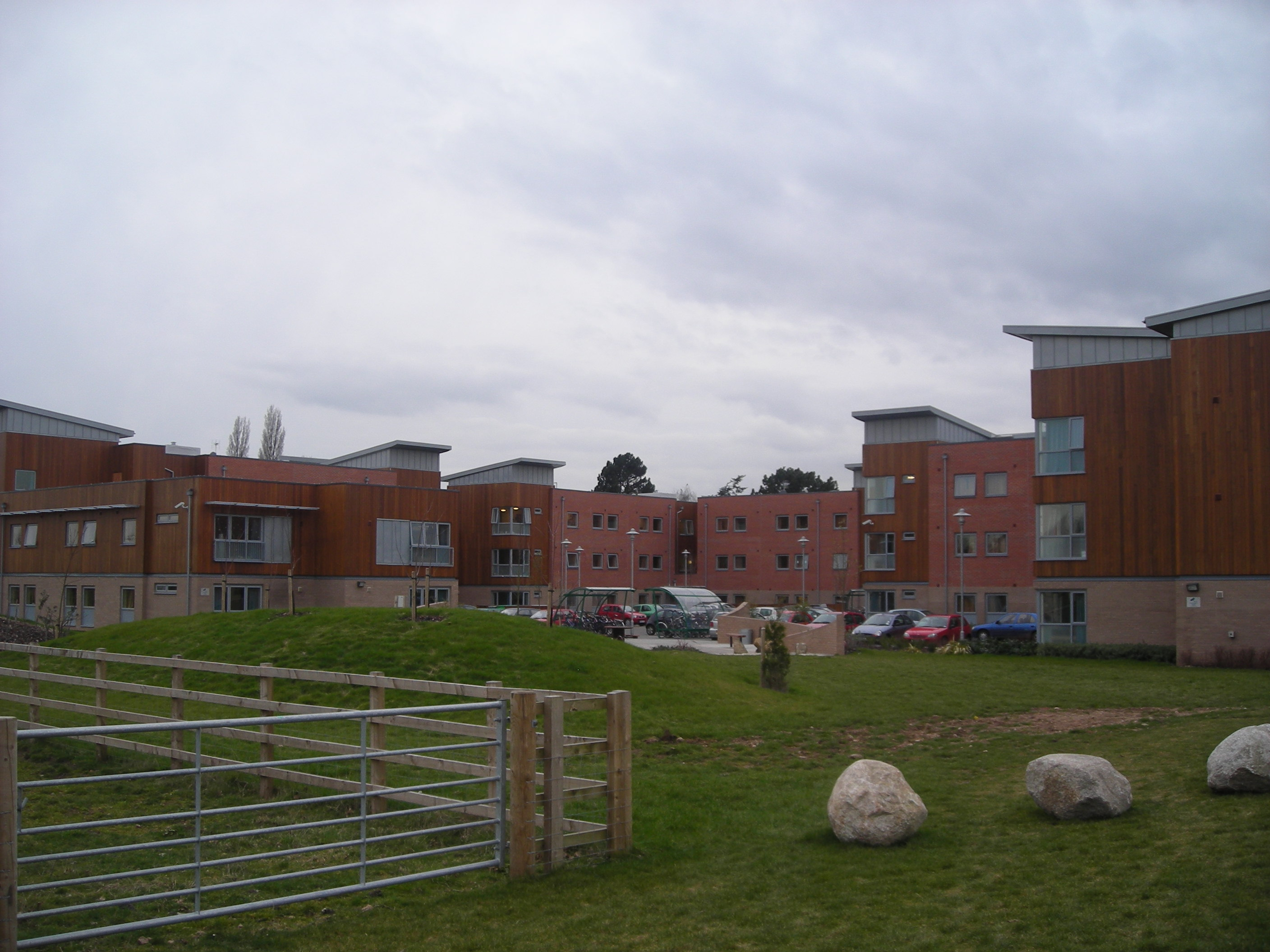
Barton, Stanford and Zouch houses, part of Bonington Halls

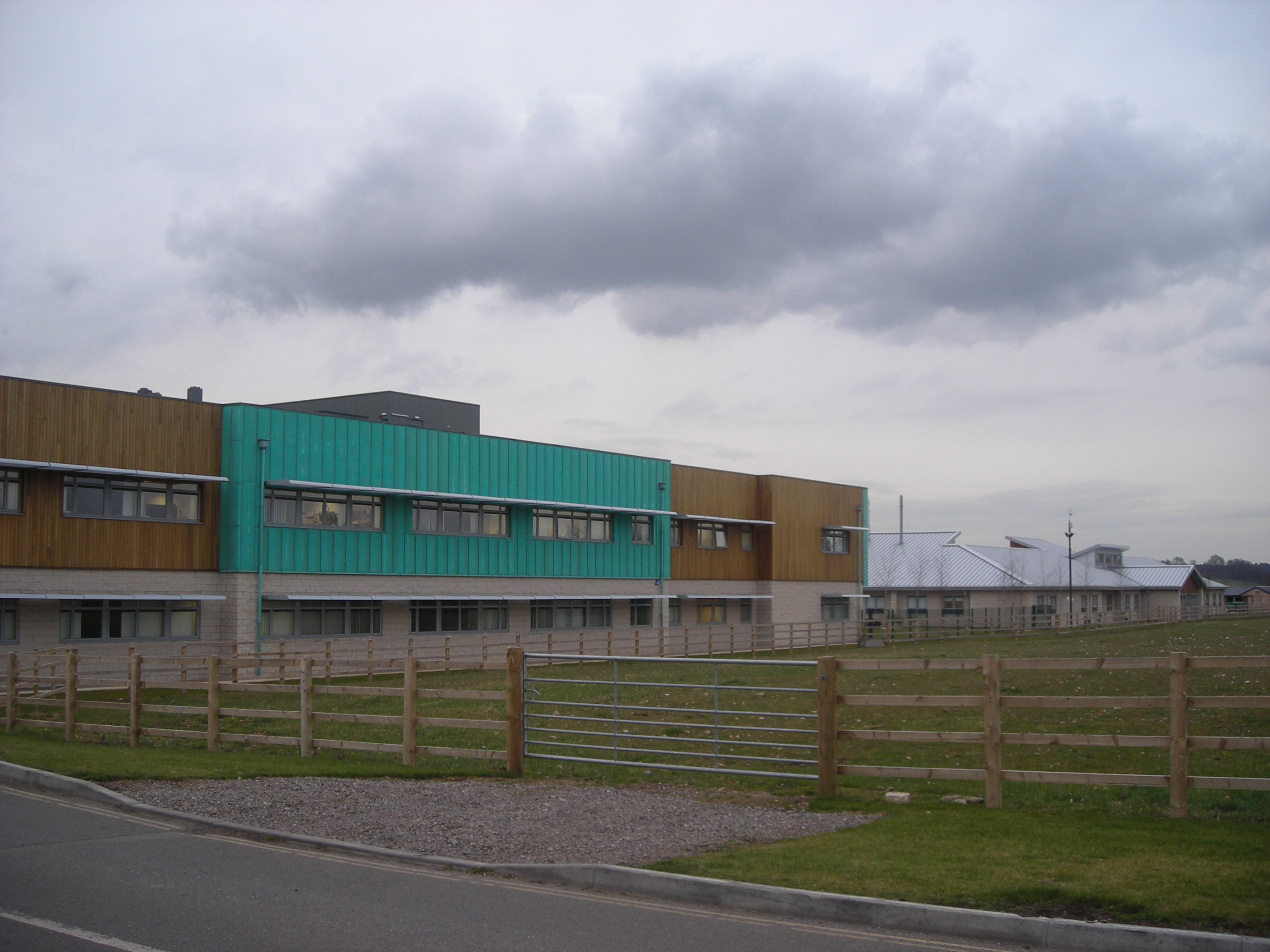
Vet School

== Castle Meadow Campus ==
In 2021, the university purchased the land for the new Castle Meadow Campus. As of November 2022, work is underway to prepare the site to be a new city-centre campus for the university, and will be the new home for the Nottingham University Business School.

== See also ==
- University of Nottingham Medical School
- University of Nottingham Medical School at Derby
