= GlaxoSmithKline Carbon Neutral Laboratory =

Chemistry laboratory at the University of Nottingham

GlaxoSmithKline Carbon Neutral Laboratory for Sustainable Chemistry
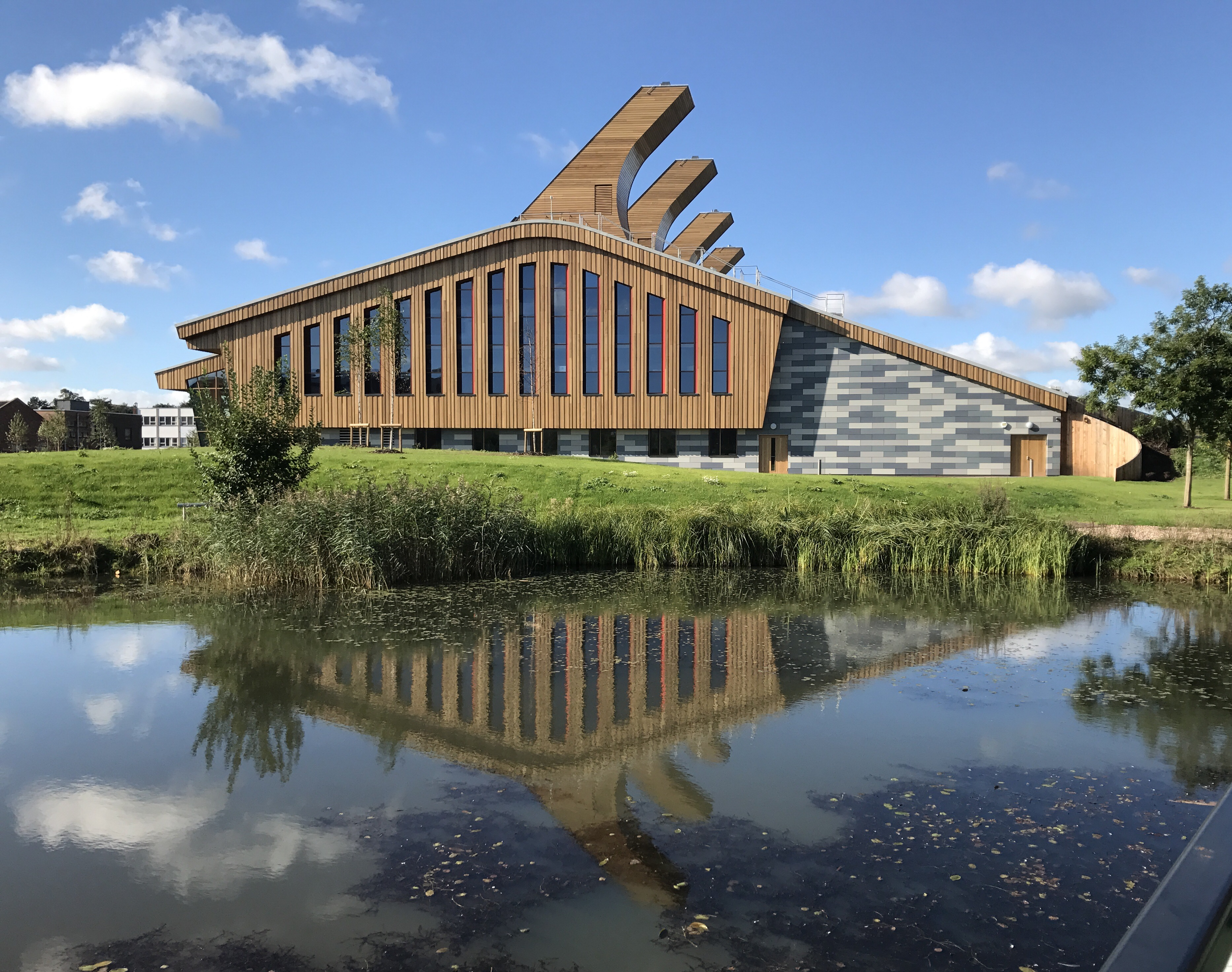
- Profile view of the GSK Carbon Neutral Laboratory
- Interactive map of GlaxoSmithKline Carbon Neutral Laboratory for Sustainable Chemistry
- Alternative names: The Carbon Neutral Laboratory

General information
- Status: Completed
- Location: Jubilee Campus, Nottingham, England
- Coordinates: 52°57′01″N 1°10′58″W
- Opened: 27 February 2017
- Cost: £15.8 million
- Owner: University of Nottingham

Technical details
- Material: German spruce, Austrian spruce, American red cedar
- Floor count: 2
- Floor area: 4,199 m^{2} (45,200 sq ft)

Design and construction
- Architect: Fairhursts Design Group
- Structural engineer: Engenuiti, Aecom
- Main contractor: Morgan Sindall

The GlaxoSmithKline Carbon Neutral Laboratory for Sustainable Chemistry is a chemistry laboratory in Nottingham, England. It is located on the Jubilee Campus of the University of Nottingham, and is part of the university's School of Chemistry. The school carries out research at the carbon neutral laboratory, which is the first of its kind in the UK. The construction was majority funded by GlaxoSmithKline, as part of their commitment to green chemistry first announced in 2010, and saw a grant of £12 million provided to the project.

There are five teaching and research laboratories on the first floor, with write-up space for about 100 researchers. The laboratories have been designed to encourage sharing of equipment, in order to be more collaborative than traditional ones. There are also dedicated instrument rooms, including nuclear magnetic resonance, and space to work with schools on outreach activities. The laboratory contains a number of innovations to reduce its environmental impact including a wooden construction, a green roof, solar panels, and extensive use of passive ventilation.

== Design and construction ==
=== Design ===
The Logo Of GlaxoSmithKline.

The Carbon Neutral Laboratory was designed to minimise the impact on the environment of its construction and operation. The design of the building is made up of modules manufactured off-site. The building support pillars and trusses are made from a combination of German spruce, Austrian Spruce, and American red cedar. The land used for the construction was previously home to the Raleigh Bicycle Company factory.

The designers used computational fluid dynamics to design the curved roof. This enables ventilation of the building by taking advantage of the prevailing wind. One of the laboratories is also ventilated in this way, to determine the viability of doing so elsewhere. The building also features a green roof, and solar panels that cover 45 per cent of the roof area and provide up to 230.9 kW. The four towers on the roof hide the building's plant equipment. Additionally, a 125-kilowatt biofuel combined heat and power system was built on-site, providing the majority of heat needed for the buildings.

The design of the building did not add any additional parking spaces, and staff are encouraged to walk, cycle or use public transport when visiting the building.

The design delivers power savings of more than 60 per cent over a traditional building design, and will use 15 per cent of the energy that a traditional building would have used for heating. This enables the carbon emitted during the construction phase to be "paid back" over a 25-year period. These savings earned the design multiple awards, including BREEAM Outstanding in 2017.

=== Construction ===
Construction of the laboratory began in the spring of 2013 and it was expected to be completed during 2014. Morgan Sindall was the main contractor for the construction of the laboratory. The wooden beams were connected using the "Resix System", by the Simonin Company. This system is completely invisible once construction is completed, and is achieved by the lamination of wood with epoxy and threaded steel bar.

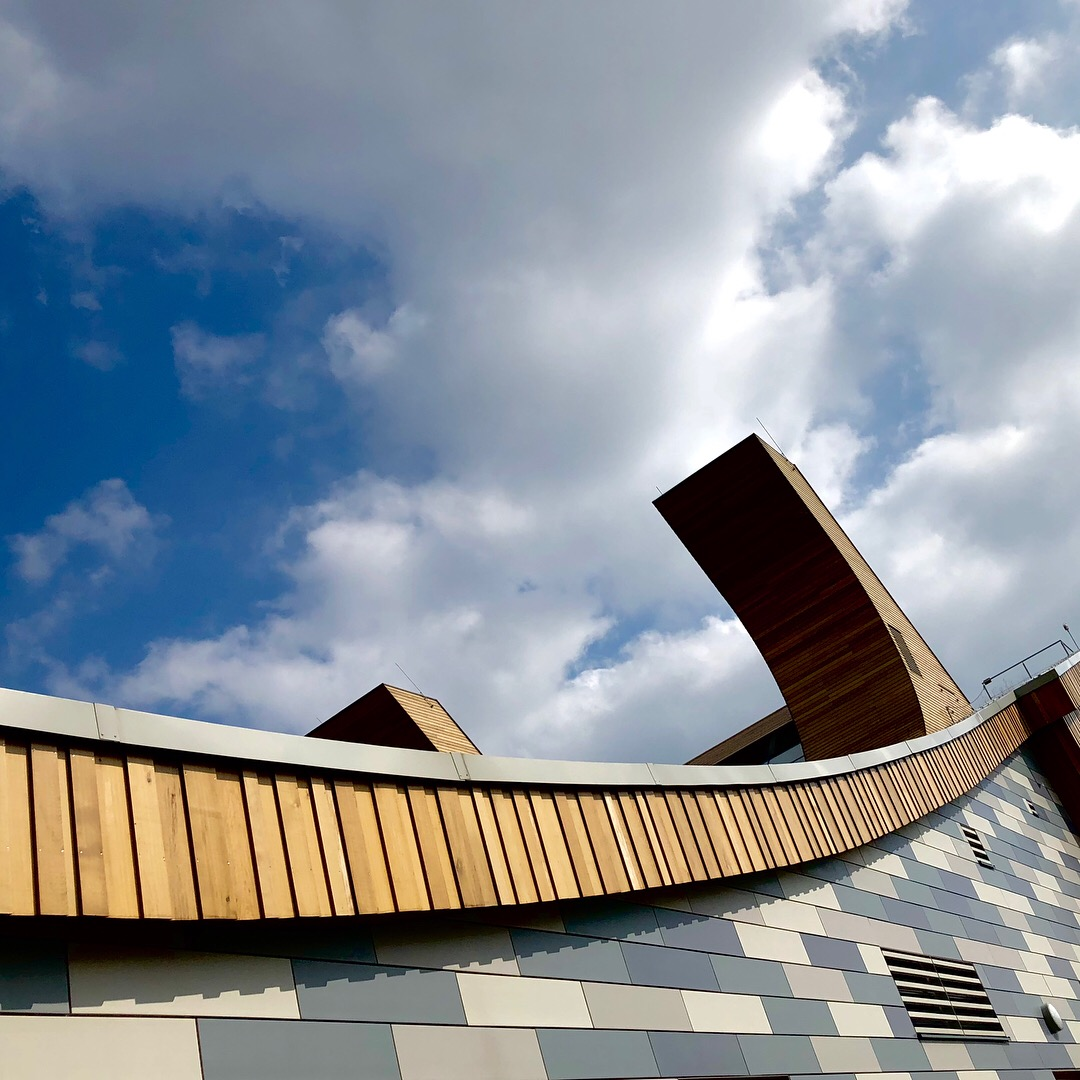
The curved roof line features a grass roof to minimise the building's carbon footprint.

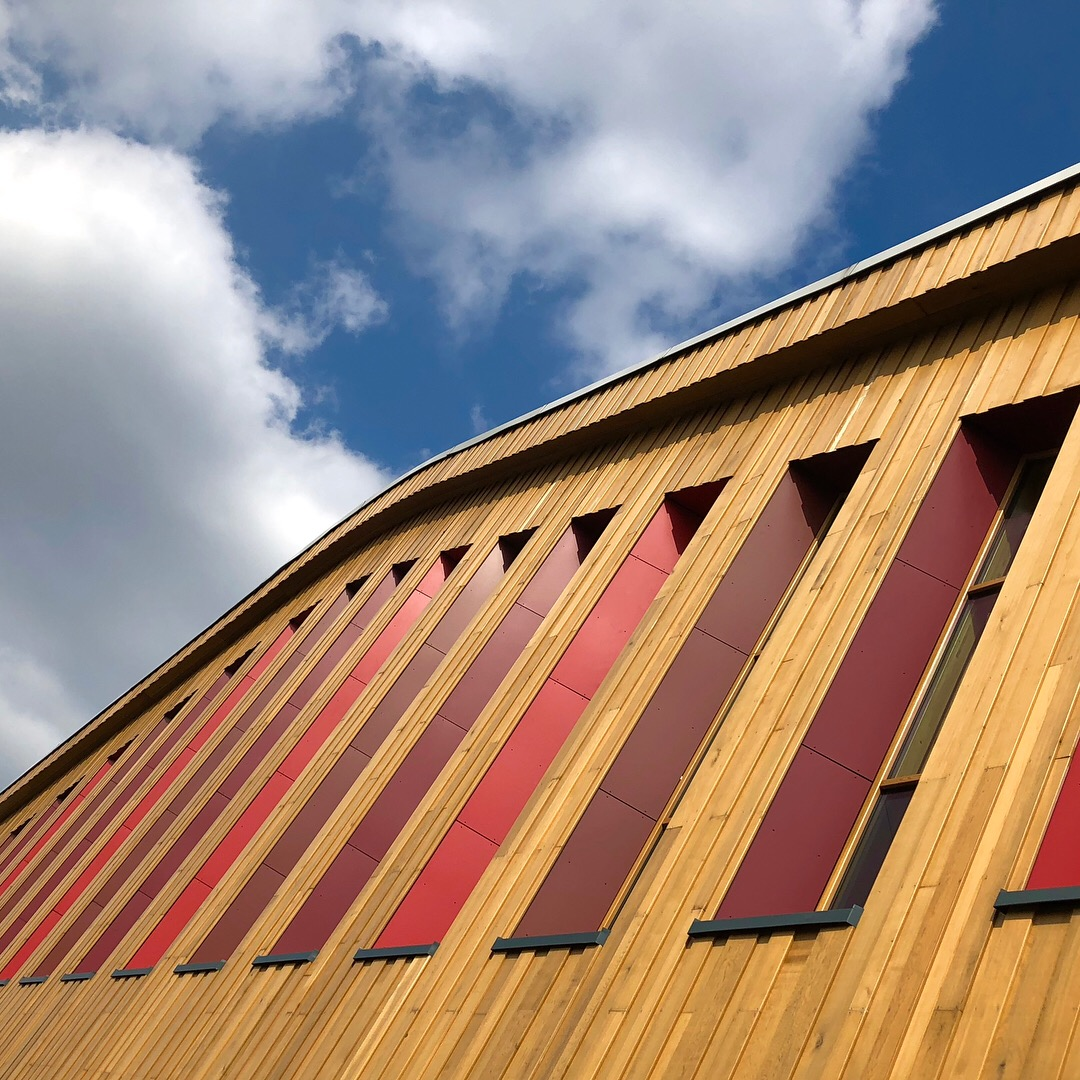
Close up of the wood cladding used in the building

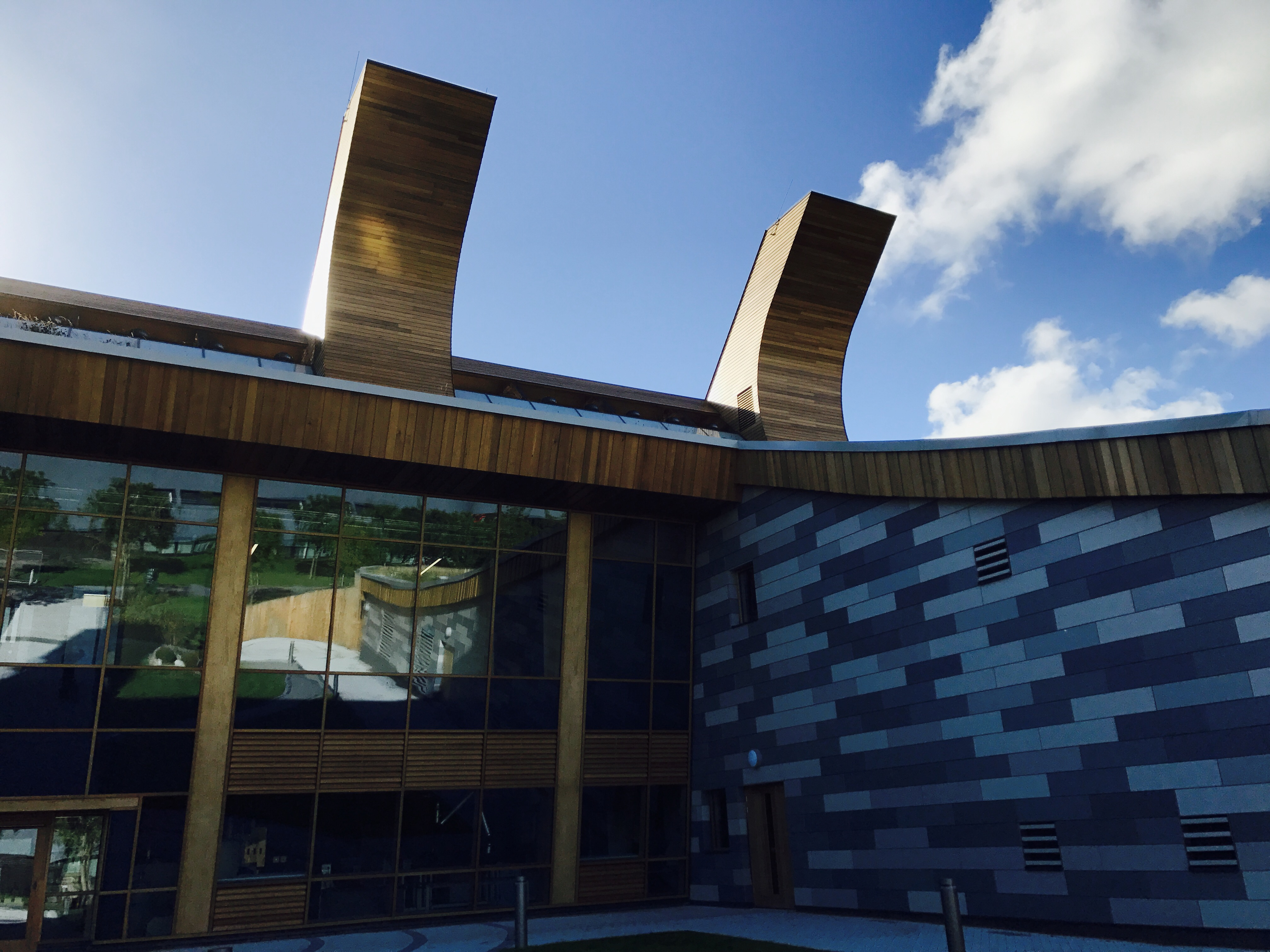
Entrance to the GSK Lab

=== Fire and reconstruction ===
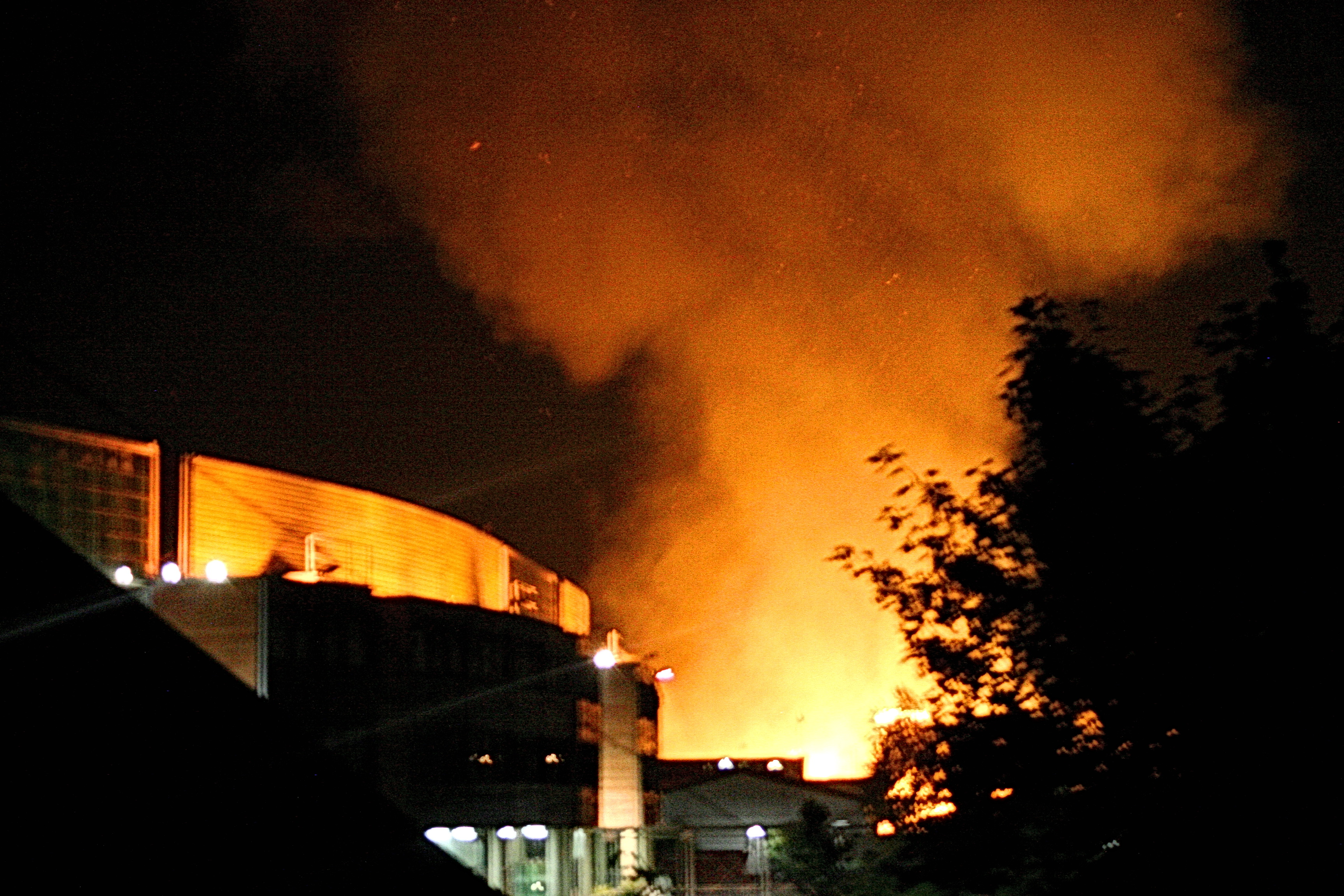
The 2014 fire broke out as construction was nearing completion.

On 12 September 2014, a fire broke out on the construction site at approximately 8:30 pm. The construction of the building was about 70-per-cent complete at the time. Sixty firefighters from five crews attended the scene and gained control, with no injuries or damage to neighbouring buildings reported. An investigation in December 2014 found no associated wrongdoing or arson. It was later announced that the cause was likely an electrical fault with the temporary site power. The report also determined that the rapid spread had been due to the partially completed state of the building, which lacked fire doors or windows, and had open voids within the floor. This allowed the fire to self-ventilate very easily. The building also had not at that point installed fire suppression systems.

The original plan was to open the laboratory in late 2014, but this was delayed due to the damage. The main contractor Morgan Sindall cleared the site after the fire and restarted construction. The opening eventually took place on 27 September 2017, with a conference led by Peter Licence, the head of the Carbon Neutral Laboratory. Around 250 guests visited the lab on its opening day, including Martyn Poliakoff, Paul Anastas and Andrew Witty.

=== Cost ===
The total cost of the laboratory was £15.8 million. GlaxoSmithKline provided the majority of the funding, with a grant of £12 million. The Wolfson Foundation also donated £750,000.
