= University Farm (Nottinghamshire) =

Research university farm in Nottinghamshire, England

Coordinates: 52°49′59″N 1°14′50″W

University Farm is a 445 hectare (4.45 km^{2}) commercial research farm attached to the Sutton Bonington Campus of the University of Nottingham, England. It lies across the parishes of Sutton Bonington and Kingston on Soar. There are two further blocks of land in Clifton on the north bank of the River Trent and at Bunny Park in the village of Bunny. Both these block are several miles from the main campus.

== Facilities ==
The farm is managed as a high performance commercial arable/dairy unit. It provides first class resources in the form of; technologically advanced facilities (including individual cow feeders, robot milking parlours), diverse soil types and cropping, and high health livestock: all of which create significant opportunities for research. It also has a key educational role by providing an environment for the effective tuition of students in biosciences and veterinary science. This is enhanced by the unique proximity of the farm to the campus as it surrounds the Biosciences and Vet School on all sides.

=== Livestock ===
The dairy herd consists of 200 cows, which are milked using 4 Lely robot milking units. Heifers are reared on the farm. Current herd average is 10,700 litres placing it in the top 10% of dairy herds in the UK. Land used by the University Vet School and Bio-Resource unit is also managed by the farm. The dairy herd is managed by Nige Armstrong.

=== Arable land ===
325 hectares are devoted to arable crops including cereals and oilseed rape; a further 5 hectares is currently in an organic rotation. 80 hectares of land is used to grow grass and maize silage for the dairy unit. The arable area will be utilising a direct drill establishment method for cereal and grass crops from Autumn 2012. The remaining land support 20 hectares of mature woodland and 15 hectares in environmental schemes. Approx 18 hectares of the arable rotation is devoted to a range of crop trials. There are a range of soil types across the farm ranging from "blow-away" sands to Keuper Marl clays.

=== Jubilee Woodland ===
As of November 2012 approx 24ha (60 acres) of the farm at Sutton Bonington will be used to plant a Jubilee woodland. The woodland will be linked by a path along the River Soar allowing it to form a stunning educational and amenity area for the university and surrounding communities.
