= Joanne Hort =

New Zealand food science academic

- Education: Sheffield Hallam University
- Scientific career
- Fields: Taste and texture of foods
- Workplaces: University of Nottingham, Massey University
- Thesis: Cheddar cheese : Its texture, chemical composition and rheological properties (1997)

Joanne Hort is a New Zealand food science academic, and as of 2019 is a full professor at the Massey University and holds the 'Fonterra Riddet Chair in Consumer and Sensory Science'.

== Academic career ==
After a 1997 PhD titled 'Cheddar cheese : Its texture, chemical composition and rheological properties' at the Sheffield Hallam University, Hort moved to University of Nottingham, rising to full professor. Hort then moved to Massey University, where she currently (2019) teaches.

Hort's research focuses on the taste and texture of foods, particularly dairy products.

== Selected works ==
- Kemp, Sarah E., Tracey Hollowood, and Joanne Hort. Sensory evaluation: a practical handbook. John Wiley & Sons, 2011.
- Hort, Joanne, and Geoff Le Grys. "Developments in the textural and rheological properties of UK Cheddar cheese during ripening." International Dairy Journal 11, no. 4-7 (2001): 475–481.
- Bayarri, Sara, Andrew J. Taylor, and Joanne Hort. "The role of fat in flavor perception: effect of partition and viscosity in model emulsions." Journal of agricultural and food chemistry 54, no. 23 (2006): 8862–8868.
- Hort, Joanne, and Tracey Ann Hollowood. "Controlled continuous flow delivery system for investigating taste− aroma interactions." Journal of Agricultural and Food Chemistry 52, no. 15 (2004): 4834–4843.
- Marciani, Luca, Johann C. Pfeiffer, Joanne Hort, Kay Head, Debbie Bush, Andy J. Taylor, Robin C. Spiller, Sue Francis, and Penny A. Gowland. "Improved methods for fMRI studies of combined taste and aroma stimuli." Journal of neuroscience methods 158, no. 2 (2006): 186–194.
