= Malcolm J. Bennett =

Professor of Plant Science

Malcolm Bennett, a Fellow of the Royal Society, is Professor of Plant Science at the University of Nottingham.

== Education and career ==
He obtained his BSc in biochemistry with Molecular Biology from the University of Manchester Institute of Science and Technology in 1985 His PhD was from the University of Warwick in 1989. Bennett has held a number of prestigious fellowships including a BBSRC Professorial Research Fellowship, a European Research Council Advanced Investigator Fellowship and a Royal Society Wolfson Research Fellowship. In 2020 he was elected to Fellowship of the Royal Society.

Bennett's research is focused on the ’hidden half of plants,’ exploring how roots grow, develop and adapt to their soil environment. His group has characterised many of the regulatory signals, genes and molecular mechanisms that control root growth and developmental responses. Bennett is co-director of the Hounsfield Facility which uses X-ray based microCT to non-invasively image roots in soil.

Bennett has published more than 200 articles in scientific journals.

== Curiosities ==
At the same institution, the University of Nottingham, there is a professor with the same name and surname, Malcolm Bennett, working at the School of Veterinary Medicine and Science. The research works of both academics are combined on the Google Scholar page of Malcolm Bennett (Plant Science), resulting in a combined H-index of 128 and a total of 58,566 citations.

== Selected publications ==
- Pandey, Bipin K.; Huang, Guoqiang; Bhosale, Rahul; Hartman, Sjon; Sturrock, Craig J.; Jose, Lottie; Martin, Olivier C.; Karady, Michal; Voesenek, Laurentius A. C. J.; Ljung, Karin; Lynch, Jonathan P.; Brown, Kathleen M.; Whalley, William R.; Mooney, Sacha J.; Zhang, Dabing; Bennett, Malcolm J. (15 January 2021). "Plant roots sense soil compaction through restricted ethylene diffusion". Science. 371 (6526): 276–280. Bibcode:2021Sci...371..276P. doi:10.1126/science.abf3013. PMID 33446554. S2CID 231606782.
- Brunoud, Géraldine; Wells, Darren M.; Oliva, Marina; Larrieu, Antoine; Mirabet, Vincent; Burrow, Amy H.; Beeckman, Tom; Kepinski, Stefan; Traas, Jan; Bennett, Malcolm J.; Vernoux, Teva (February 2012). "A novel sensor to map auxin response and distribution at high spatio-temporal resolution". Nature. 482 (7383): 103–106. Bibcode:2012Natur.482..103B. doi:10.1038/nature10791. PMID 22246322. S2CID 4303212.
- Trinh, Duy-Chi; Lavenus, Julien; Goh, Tatsuaki; Boutté, Yohann; Drogue, Quentin; Vaissayre, Virginie; Tellier, Frédérique; Lucas, Mikaël; Voß, Ute; Gantet, Pascal; Faure, Jean-Denis; Dussert, Stéphane; Fukaki, Hidehiro; Bennett, Malcolm J.; Laplaze, Laurent; Guyomarc’h, Soazig (9 July 2019). "PUCHI regulates very long chain fatty acid biosynthesis during lateral root and callus formation". Proceedings of the National Academy of Sciences. 116 (28): 14325–14330. doi:10.1073/pnas.1906300116. PMC 6628829. PMID 31235573.
