= Keynes College, Kent =

College of the University of Kent

Keynes College
- University of Kent
- Established: 1968
- Named after: John Maynard Keynes
- Website: www.kent.ac.uk

Keynes College is the third-oldest college of the University of Kent. It was established in 1968.

Prior to the start of the 2020-21 academic year, the post of College Master was abolished at Keynes and all the other University of Kent colleges.

== Namesake ==
It was named, after much debate, after the economist John Maynard Keynes. Other names considered included Richborough, a town in Kent, and Anselm, a former archbishop of Canterbury. Appropriately the University's department of Economics is located within the building.

== College architecture ==
The college was designed by different architects from Eliot and Rutherford and consequently has a very different design. With limited funds, the initial study bedrooms lacked individual wash-basins, instead having communal facilities, though common areas for groups of study bedrooms were included, a change from the Eliot and Rutherford corridors.

Keynes is notable for having a much clearer separation between the residential and non-residential areas than the other three colleges, with the teaching rooms and old dining hall concentrated at the front and east of the college.

2011 has been a year of change for Keynes College, with bedroom space expanding to almost 700 students. Keynes College is now one of the biggest colleges on the Canterbury Campus and has rooms for catered and self-catered students. Keynes College boast an expanded Dolche Vita where catered students are provided with breakfast and dinner.

== College traditions ==
Every year the college holds "Keynestock", a music festival for UKC artists, which attracts over 1500 students and raises money for charity.
