= UKC Radio =

Student radio station of the University of Kent (1967–2007)

UKCR logo from the 999kHz days

UKC Radio was the student radio station for the University of Kent at Canterbury (UKC). it began life in 1967 as an audio distribution system through the central heating radiators before obtaining a broadcast licence in 1968, at which point it was operated as a student service by the University of Kent Students' Union.

It was replaced by CSR 97.4FM on 15 January 2007, an FM radio station broadcasting to the city which is a joint venture between the University of Kent and Canterbury Christ Church University.

== History ==
The broadcasting station that became UKC Radio had its origins in the autumn term of 1967 as an audio feed through the radiator system. This was inspired by an article in the magazine Practical Wireless entitled ‘Communications through the Ground’. The article explained how an audio signal injected into two separate earthing points could be detected by connecting an amplifier to two more earthing points nearby. Budding electronics students decided to test this out in Eliot College by connecting the loudspeaker output of a HiFi amplifier between the mains earth and the central heating radiator system. The signal could be heard loud and clear in study bedrooms throughout the college by connecting a modified transistor radio, used as an audio amplifier, between the radiator and the metal table lamp, which provided a connection to the mains earth.

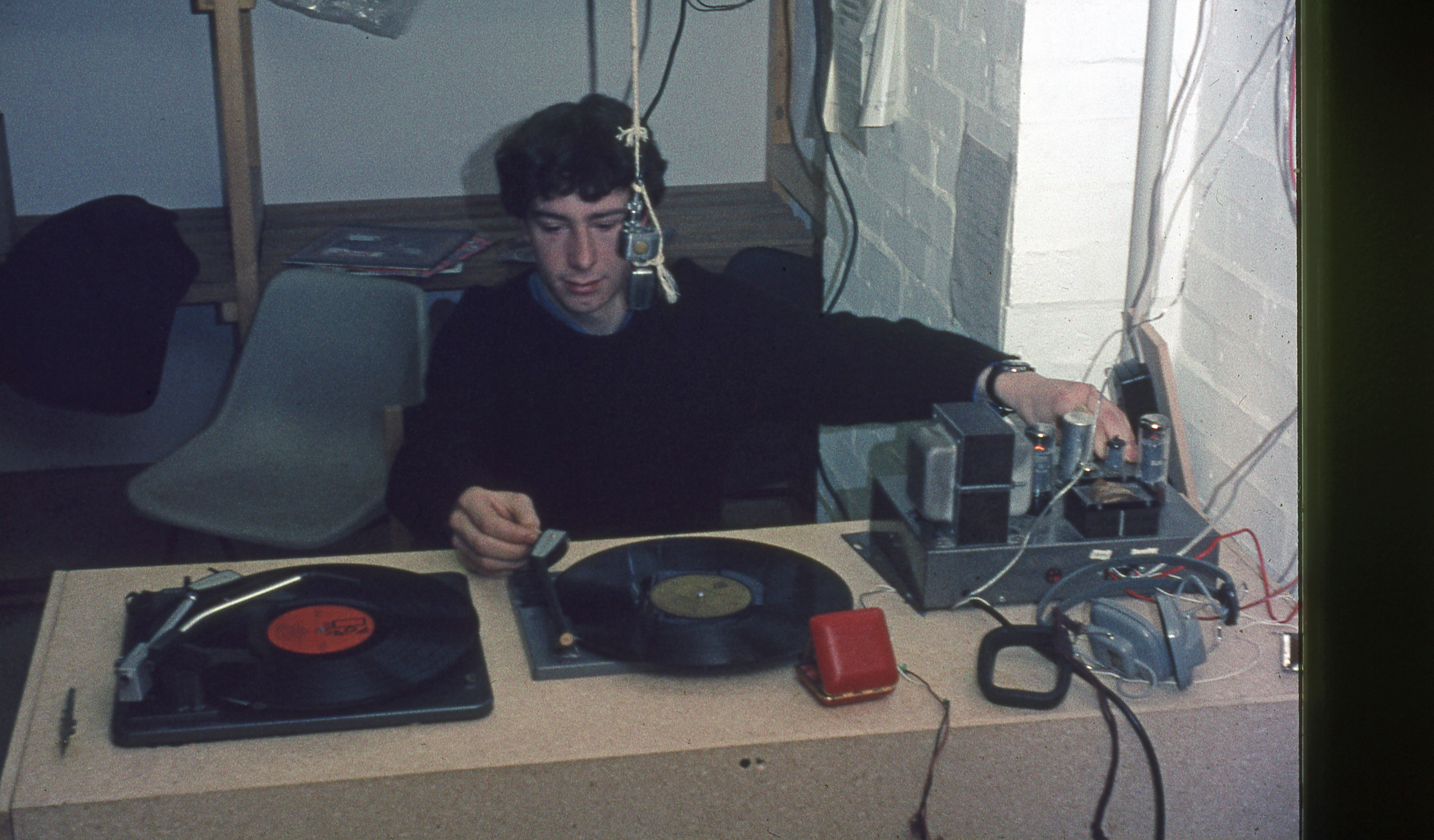
UKC Radiator Radio

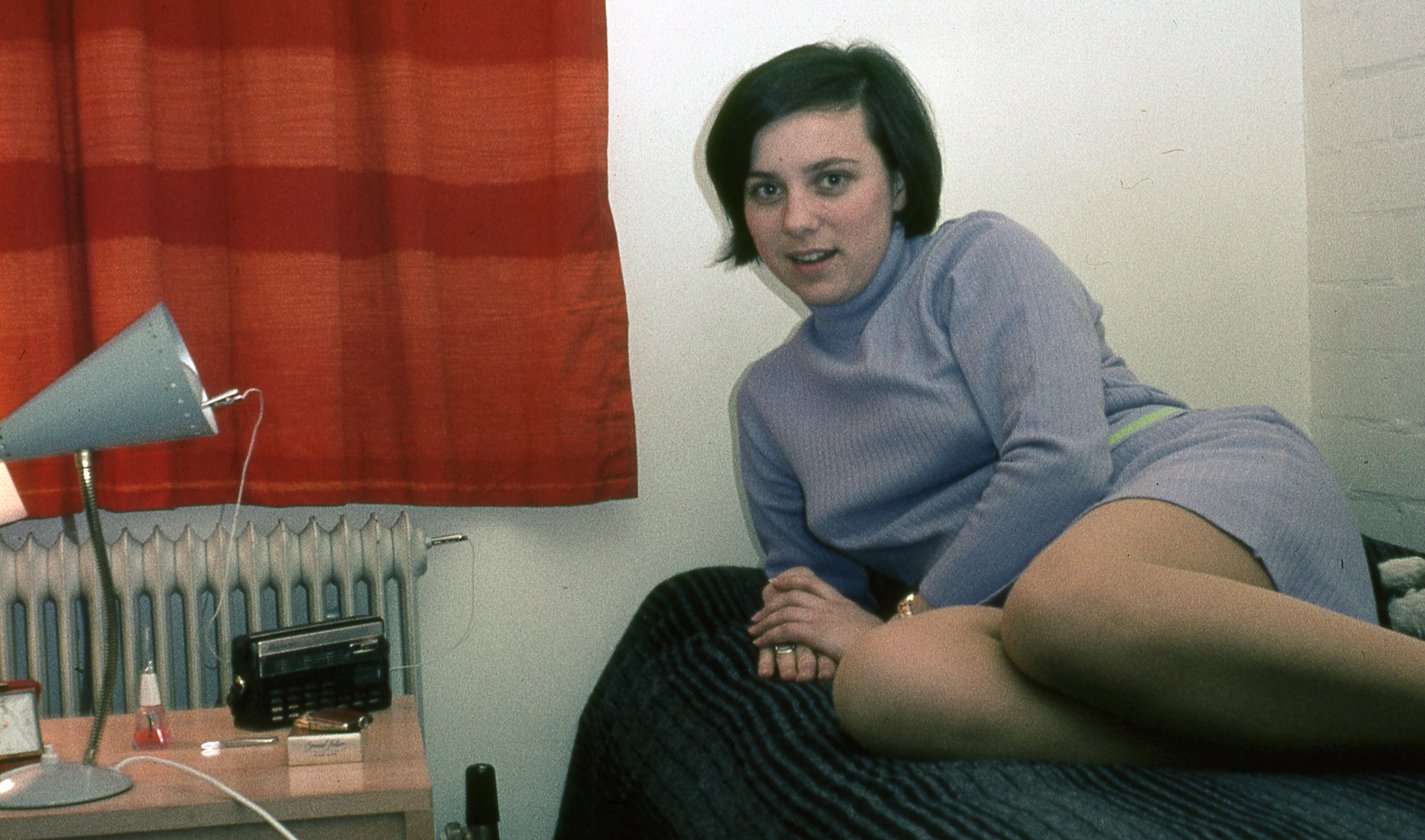
UKC Radio Reception via radiator and lamp

An impromptu broadcasting station was soon formed and Rutherford College swiftly followed suit. A surprising number of students were willing to have their radios modified. This involved soldering two wires across the volume control – the other ends being connected to the radiator and table lamp with small crocodile clips. The broadcasts were legal because they were an audio feed, not a radio broadcast. The stations became known as Audio Eliot and Audio Rutherford and soon achieved fame in the national press. The stations combined forces under the name Audio Rutherford and overcame safety issues raised by the University Surveyor which had threatened closure.

The station provided a full broadcasting schedule of music, university news and chat. This spurred on attempts to obtain a broadcasting licence to operate an inductive loop medium wave transmission system. Initial applications to the GPO were rejected but a licence was eventually granted several months later and UKC Radio was born. There were some short-lived attempts by other students to set up pirate radio stations, but these were never affiliated to the official UKC Radio predecessors, who were always legal. There is a long-standing controversy between UKC and University Radio York as to who ran the first university radio station. York was making radio broadcasts in 1967, having been granted a test licence, at about the same time as UKC started audio broadcasts.

When UKC Radio was granted a licence the chance was taken to build a full studios complex on the lowest floor of Eliot College. These studios were designed around a typical BBC layout, with the emphasis on Drama and Live Music, so this was given the biggest space (studio B), and the best sound proofing. However, there was also a small self op studio for news bulletins - and the occasional music programme (studio A). Linking between, with a view of both studios was a Master Control Room (called "Continuity" until late in 1996), where a continuity announcer linked between programmes - the desk here had just 3 faders - one for each studio, and one for the microphone. There was considerable debate as to this studio layout, because the small self op studio (Studio A) was in use pretty much all the time, so it was slowly upgraded, and eventually boasted a big home-made 10 channel mixing desk, with NAB cartridge jingle machines.

UKC Radio carried an overnight sustaining service from 1984, using LBC (which was taken off air via a huge aerial on the roof of Eliot). This was also used for IRN news on the hour.

Studio A was rebuilt in 1989, with the arrival of the first Alice Series A desk. By 1991 the first satellite tuner had arrived, which gave a much cleaner IRN feed and occasional news stories from MTV. In 1993 this also provided a sustaining service, in the form of first QEFM, then MTV's soundtrack overnight. Virgin Radio was taken as a sustainer in 1992, and then Capital Radio from 1993 to 1997. Ironically when QEFM (Quality Europe FM Radio, based in Camberley) closed in 1994 the cartridge jingle machines were purchased and used for nearly a decade at UKC Radio - nearly five times as long as QEFM lasted.

The studios were swapped over in a summer long operation in 1995, and a considerably revamped thanks in part to a donation of some redundant equipment from Winchester Hospital Radio. The station started using the brand name UKCR at the time of the first FM broadcast. The studios continued to be revamped with new equipment and a window was knocked through to the reception area in 1999.

In 2000 the first song played on LPAM (1350 AM) was Re-Rewind by The Artful Dodger featuring Craig David.

In 2002 digital output was introduced for the first time, with an output system using Myriad software, and new Alice Series A desk in Studio A.

== Transmission ==
For most of its history, UKC Radio was available on 300m Medium Wave (officially 998 kHz AM, though it apparently used a 1 MHz crystal as these were far cheaper) via induction loops which were on the top of the college buildings - meaning you could only hear the station in limited parts of the campus. The inductive loops used a figure-of-eight configuration to prevent off-campus radiation in accordance with the licence conditions. These loops actually operated as a kind of leaky feeder, with a single strand of cable draped around the roof of the buildings, connected to a coax cable that linked via the central boiler room to the original transmitter (called Amanda by the engineers) in Eliot. This was replaced with a Wireless Workshop transmitter in 1995 (called Fred).

Various short term broadcasts on FM were carried out, using Restricted Service Licences. The first of these was in 1992, with a further one month in 1994, two in the academic year of 1994/5, one month in February/March 1996, and the last in 1998. Initially the transmitters were sited on the roof of Eliot, however by 1996 the transmission site was moved to the roof of the library. With 20 watts output power at 20 meters transmission height (on a location that is one of the highest in Kent) fringe reception was possible in London.

However, UKC Radio was heard unofficially throughout the city at least once during Rag Week in the early 1970s when a T-aerial appeared overnight slung between two corners of the cross-shaped Eliot College.

The studios were used for one of Invicta FM's breakfast shows in 1997, when a dedicated ISDN line was installed.

During the late 90s Low Powered AM (LPAM) was introduced, allowing the station to broadcast to the whole campus. The station moved frequency to 1350AM in 2000, with a transmission mast sited to the west of the new students' union building, between The Venue and behind the old bus stops. The mast was painted brown as this was one of the conditions from the City council in order for planning consent to be given. The mast still stands today, however is not in use.

== Former UKC Radio people ==
- Ofcom: Neil Gardner.
- ITN's Shiulie Ghosh.
- BBC Radio 1 Joe Harland, Executive Producer.
- BBC Radio (Business Unit): Adam Kirtley.
- BBC Radio (General News Service): Julian Lorkin.
- BBC Radio Derby's Ian Skye (was Ian Wickens).
- Invicta FM's Stuart Thomas.
- ARD German TV News Reporter: Sandra Fiene.
- Wave 105's Nick Piercey
- Delta FM's Mark Stanley
- PCR FM and Corby Radio's Dave 'The Edge' Edgeworth
- Professor of Audio Technology, University of Salford: Jamie Angus
- CNN & CNNI's Danielle Whelton
