= Canterbury Student Radio =

Radio station in Canterbury, United Kingdom

Coordinates: 51°17′46.8″N 1°04′08.2″E

- Canterbury; England

Programming
- Format: Contemporary Student

Ownership
- Owner: University of Kent, Kent Union

History
- First air date: 15 January 2007
- Former frequencies: 97.4 MHz

Links
- Website: www.csrfm.com

Canterbury Student Radio (CSR FM) is a membership based student and community radio station based in Canterbury, England. It is currently funded by Kent Union based at the University of Kent. When actively broadcasting, the radio station airs a mixture of live and pre-recorded programming from Studio Red based in the Student Media Centre on the main campus 24 hours a day.

CSR FM was the first student-led community radio station in the country to acquire a community FM licence on 15 January 2007. The station has and continues to aim to host a diverse range of daytime, specialist music, and speech-based radio programming.

Currently, the station is broadcasting live online on their website.

== History ==
Student Radio has existed in Canterbury since 1966, initially on an unlicensed basis. In 1967, UKC Radio started broadcasting legally on an AM licence which covered the University of Kent campus only. Canterbury Christ Church University also had a student radio station, C4 Radio, broadcasting on AM on a similar strictly contained basis.

When Restricted Service Licences (RSLs) became available both stations periodically took advantage of the scheme to gain citywide coverage on FM, albeit only for short periods. Each station allowed the other some airtime during their RSLs.

Canterbury Christ Church University's first RSL broadcast occurred in 2002, under the then Station Manager, Jim Cohen. Test broadcasts established that most of the city could pick up the radio station as well as certain parts of the surrounding countryside. The RSL broadcast lasted 2 weeks and was generally considered to be a great success.

The two student unions, which operated these radio stations, decided to make a single combined bid for the Canterbury community radio licence and were successful. In order to apply for the licence Canterbury Youth Student Media (CYSM) Ltd. was set up which has directors compromising of members of both universities and their unions and also the executive committee members, as well as external directors. The station launched on 15 January 2007 at 5 pm on 97.4fm. One of the first shows included the student soap series 'Konkers', broadcast 8–9 pm on Tuesdays. This aired alongside programmes including 'The Indigo Poprock Show', 'Hairbrush Hits', and 'Open Mic'. Indeed, the specialist music programme 'Departures' won Best Specialist Music Show at that year's Student Radio Awards.

Following its first anniversary, the station held workshops for young individuals from the Canterbury community, teaching key skills in radio and music - a project forwarded for a Times Higher Education Award. By 2009, the station was typically broadcasting 12 hours of output per day and hosted BBC Radio Kent's local music programme 'BBC Introducing'. After achieving silver, in 2010, the student radio association awarded CSR FM 'Best Outside Broadcast' for coverage of the then Lounge on The Farm music festival. Broadcasts were made from a disused pig sty with a team of 15, who overcame technical difficulties, held several live sessions and aired feeds from all stages.

On 22 July 2011 the station announced that it had been successful with its first licence extension application, allowing it to broadcast for another 5 years until 2017. The following year, Studio Blue was opened on the main campus of Canterbury Christ Church University to increase outreach and accessibility to students at both Canterbury-based universities. Additionally, 'The Youth Academy' was launched with the aim of teaching young people transferable skills in broadcast media and music.

In 2013, CSR FM teamed up with Inquire Media (student newspaper) and Kent Television (KTV) to raise money for Catching Lives - a local homeless charity based in Canterbury, with a 48-hour live student media marathon. A total of £1,500 was raised from online donations and rag buckets for the charity. The social media hashtag '#awakefor48' was posted 1060 times and trended on Twitter in Canterbury for the duration of the broadcast. Over 700 people tuned into the livestream. The programme won 'fundraising event of the year' at the Kent Union awards that year and the I Love Student Radio Awards 'charity champions'. Also launching that year were the annual KIC awards.

In 2014, the Student Media Centre building was opened by then BBC Radio 5 Live presenter Charlotte Green, providing facilities to all Kent Student Media outlets, including for CSR FM a studio booth known as Studio Red, which remains in current operation. Also in the same year, the Youth Academy project was first nominated and highly commended at the I Love Student Radio Awards for 'Best Outreach Project'.

In 2015, CSR FM began its annual outside broadcasts from the Canterbury Food and Drink Festival. Also marking its debut was 'CSR Presents', an evening broadcast covering live and local music performed primarily at the Ballroom. The first four broadcasts featured 12 local artists. While the programme was also nominated for an I Love Student Radio Award, the Youth Academy won the 'Best Outreach Project'. Indeed, the following year, the station was nominated a record eight times at the same awards, with the Youth Academy winning 'Best Outreach Project' for the second time running.

On 19 August 2016, the station again announced a second licence extension application had been successful, allowing it to broadcast for a further 5 years until 2021.

On 8 June 2020, CSR FM temporarily stopped broadcasting due to the ongoing COVID-19 pandemic. The board transferred the station's licensing from CYSM to Kent Union Trading Ltd and immediately handed back their broadcast license to Ofcom. Now a University of Kent focused radio station, CSR FM handed Studio Blue, based on the main Canterbury Christ Church University campus, to their Film Radio and Television studies department. On 9 September 2020, broadcast resumed online primarily with a reduced pre-recorded schedule. Frequent closures ensued in late 2020 to early 2021 in line with COVID-19 legislation. Since lockdown easing, the studio has remained open to members.

Ongoing COVID-19 uncertainties at the time led to a significant decline in programming and studio training for new presenters. Since July 2022, the station has experienced continued technical difficulties, ultimately leading to the discontinuation of its livestream for almost a year from November 2022. From February 2023, CSR FM was inactive as an online or FM station, and instead encouraged members to produce podcast output via Spotify while aiming to resolve its livestream issues. From October 2023, CSR FM's livestream resumed under a new student committee. Its current live output is solely composed of non-stop playlisted chart, hip-hop and dance anthems last updated in September 2022, while live and pre-recorded programming schedule aims to be resumed.

In 2026, the station has re-started broadcasting live.

== Station sound ==
Since its inception until September 2020, when not broadcasting live programming, the station's specialised in playing indie/alternative curated playlists. However, in an attempt to increase student listenership and popularity, the station changed its focus to chart/hip-hop/dance based genres and played out live in university outlets including Woody's and the Gulbenkian Theatre.

The station refreshed its A-list, B-list, and C-list playlists frequently, with popular and local artists reserved for the high rotation A-list. Typically, playlisted tracks would be randomly selected by the station's playout system, Myriad 5 Playout, to air each hour in between scheduled programming. On Fridays-Sundays from 5 pm, a throwback hour playlist would air well-known popular tracks alongside RnB, hip-hop and dance anthems from the 1980s through to the present. This was introduced shortly after the station's imaging rebrand in September 2020.

From January 2021, CSR After Hours was launched. The overnight playlist broadcast from midnight to 7 am from Saturdays to Thursdays and played a variety of 'chill' genres. This included indie-pop, bedroom pop, acoustic, and folk. The majority of tracks were selected from music promotional emails sent to the station and had an emphasis on acoustic music. Artists played ranged from local Canterbury-based band Tokyo Tea Room, folk artists including John Martyn and Julie Fowlis. Indeed, After Hours gave frequent air play to many up-and-coming British and international artists. Currently, CSR After Hours has ceased broadcast and may resume in the near future.

Live or pre-recorded radio shows varied from daytime, specialist music, to speech-based programming. Each show type was managed by a respective head of department. Each would be overseen by an on-air manager who looked after the schedule.

Occasionally, during its peak output period, the station would cover live local events including sports tournaments, live concerts, or student elections. CSR FM conducted several outside broadcasts from festivals including Lounge On The Farm between 2010-2014 and the University of Kent's live music event Keynestock. Notable performances broadcast live from the 2011 Lounge On The Farm festival included Ellie Goulding, Katy B, Everything Everything, and Echo & the Bunnymen.

== Awards ==
Since CSR FM launched in 2007, both the station and its presenters, have been honoured with many national Student Radio Awards.

SRA Awards

| Year | Gold | Silver | Bronze |
|---|---|---|---|
| 2021 | Best Station Sound | - | - |
| 2017 | The Student Radio Chart Show Award | Best Specialist Music Programming | Best Student Radio Station |
| 2016 | - | - | Best Speech Programming |
| 2015 | - | Best Female (Anna Louise Walter) | Best Marketing and Station Sound |
| 2014 | - | Best Male (Joel Grove) | - |
| 2010 | Best Live or Outside Broadcast | - | Best Technical Achievement |
| 2009 | - | Best Live or Outside Broadcast | - |
| 2007 | Best Specialist Show | - | - |

The station has also been honoured with a number of awards at the I LOVE STUDENT RADIO ceremony, which takes place each year at the National Student Radio Association Conference. In 2015 and 2016 CSR was also the most nominated station at the awards.

| Year | ILOVEStudentRadio Awards |
|---|---|
| 2017 | Outstanding Contribution (Aaron Cross) & Best Audience Initiative (Highly Commended) |
| 2016 | Best Outreach Project |
| 2015 | Best Outreach Project & Outstanding Contribution (Aaron Cross) |
| 2014 | Best Outreach Project (Highly Commended) |
| 2013 | Charity Champion |
| 2012 | Community Spirit |

In 2016 the Community Media Association launched the Community Radio Awards, the first ceremony was held at Birmingham City University.

| Year | Gold | Silver | Bronze |
|---|---|---|---|
| 2017 | Best Specialist Show (The Urban LP) | - | - |
| 2016 | - | Best Marketing and Station Sound | - |

CSR FM, in collaboration with InQuire Media and KTV - two additional Student Media outlets at the University of Kent, are part of the annual KIC Awards. These awards are judged by media industry experts and professionals including established radio DJs, producers, journalists, filmmakers, directors, etc.
