= Darwin College, Kent =

College of the University of Kent

Darwin College
- University of Kent
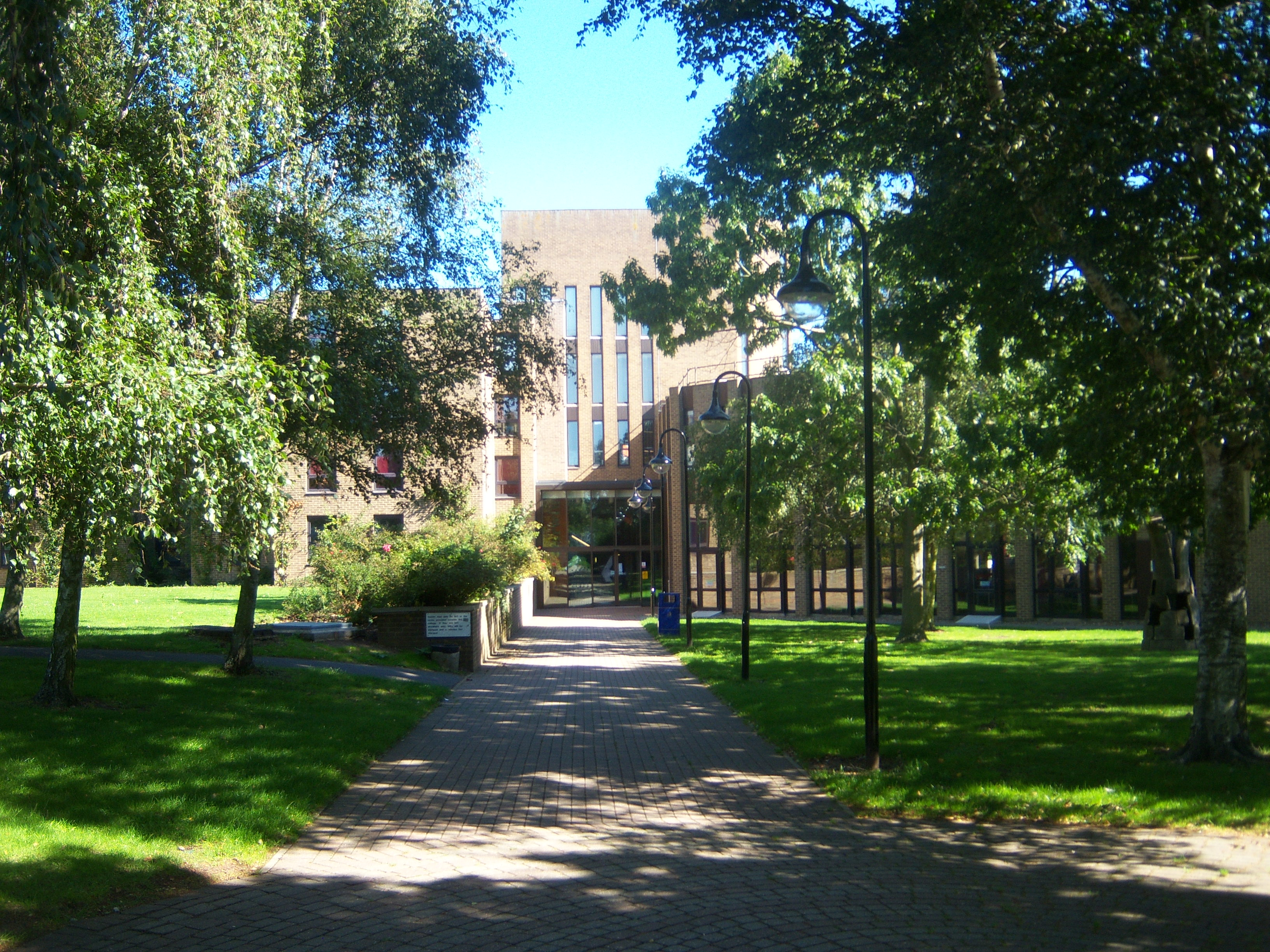
- Established: 1970
- Named after: Charles Darwin
- President: Grace Mercer
- Website: www.kent.ac.uk

Darwin College is the fourth-oldest college of the University of Kent, an English higher education institution in the United Kingdom. It was opened in 1970.

== Namesake ==
After much debate, the college was named after Charles Darwin, the biologist. Unusually for a namesake of a Kent college, Darwin had strong connections to the historic county of Kent, having lived in Down House at Downe (now in the London Borough of Bromley) for the last forty years of his life.

Other names considered in the lengthy process included:

- Anselm, after Anselm a former Archbishop of Canterbury
- Attlee, after Clement Attlee, the post-war prime minister
- Becket, after Thomas Becket, former Archbishop of Canterbury, murdered in the city's cathedral and subsequently canonised (this was the recommendation of the college's provisional committee but was rejected by the University Senate)
- Conrad, after the novelist Joseph Conrad who lived near Canterbury and is buried in the city
- Elgar, after composer Edward Elgar
- Maitland
- Marlowe, after playwright Christopher Marlowe
- Russell, after philosopher Bertrand Russell (this was the recommendation of the Senate but rejected by the Council; Russell's political activism was the cause of much opposition)
- Tyler, after Peasants' Revolt leader Wat Tyler (after whom Tyler Hill, on which the college stands, is named)

The name was eventually decided by a postal ballot of members of the Senate, choosing from a shortlist of Attlee, Conrad, Darwin, Elgar, Maitland, Marlowe and Tyler.

== Darwin Student Committee (DSC) ==
The Darwin Student Committee (DSC) is a group of students who volunteer their time to make the life of Darwin College students more enjoyable. They meet and discuss issues that concern the students, deal with problems, organise events during Welcome Week, listen to concerns and generally improve the experience of students within the College.

Weekly DSC meetings plan college events, such as the Masquerade Ball, discuss issues affecting students, which campaigns to run, and receive and pass on important messages from Kent Union and their sabbatical officers.

Since the college opened, there has been an annual vote within the college to elect the student President.

== Student life ==
Darwin College was home to Origins, a restaurant and bar operated by the University of Kent as part of its campus dining venues. Until 2017, Origins was a Tex-Mex restaurant known for its homemade nachos, fajitas, and burritos. That year, it transitioned into an American smokehouse and barbecue venue, serving dishes such as hanging skewers, burgers, and po’boys.

In addition to its food offerings, Origins hosted a regular quiz night on Sundays, a popular karaoke night, and Ruby Tuesdays, the longest-running indie night event on campus. The venue was well-known among students, staff, and visitors.

Origins has since closed, and the space is now used for teaching purposes.
