= University of Kent =

University based in Kent, England

Coordinates: 51.297°N 1.069°E

- Coat of arms
- Former name: University of Kent at Canterbury
- Motto: Latin: Cui servire regnare est
- Motto in English: Literal translation: 'Whom to serve is to reign' (Book of Common Prayer translation: 'whose service is perfect freedom')
- Type: Public
- Established: 4 January 1965; 61 years ago
- Affiliations: Universities UK; SGroup European Universities' Network; EUA; ACU; Eastern ARC; Universities at Medway
- Endowment: £3.8 million (2022)
- Budget: £260.4 million (2021–22)
- Chancellor: YolanDa Brown (as chancellor of LASE)
- Vice-Chancellor: Jane Harrington (as vice-chancellor of LASE)
- Students: 16,070 (2024/25)
- Undergraduates: 13,340 (2024/25)
- Postgraduates: 2,730 (2024/25)
- Location: Canterbury and Medway
- Campus: Semi-rural
Colours
Kent Blue and Kent Red
- Website: kent.ac.uk

The University of Kent (formerly the University of Kent at Canterbury, abbreviated as UKC) is a university within the London and South East University Group (LASE) in Kent, England. It was an independent university from 1965, when it was founded by royal charter, to 2026, when it merged with the University of Greenwich to form LASE. Following the merger, Kent became an academic division within LASE, operating under the branding of the University of Kent, while LASE's academic board became responsible for the admission of students, teaching and granting degrees. However, students apply to, are taught at, and receive degrees in the name of, the University of Kent.

The university's principal campus occupies 300 acres of land overlooking the World Heritage Site of Canterbury Cathedral, and it also maintains a campus in Medway. The university has students from 158 different nationalities and 41% of its academic and research staff come from outside the United Kingdom. It is a member of the Santander Network of European universities encouraging social and economic development.

Alumni include two Nobel laureates in literature – Sir Kazuo Ishiguro and Abdulrazak Gurnah – as well as prominent individuals in politics, media, and law.

== History ==
=== Origins ===
A university in the city of Canterbury was first considered in 1947, when an anticipated growth in student numbers led several residents to seek the creation of a new university, including Kent. However, the plans never came to fruition. A decade later both population growth and greater demand for university places led to a re-consideration. In 1959 the Education Committee of Kent County Council explored the creation of a new university, formally accepting the proposal unanimously on 24 February 1960. Two months later the Education Committee agreed to seek a site at or near Canterbury, given the historical associations of the city, subject to the support of Canterbury City Council.

By 1962 a site was found at Beverley Farm, straddling the then boundary between the City of Canterbury and the administrative county of Kent. The university's original name, chosen in 1962, was the University of Kent at Canterbury, reflecting its cross-boundary campus. The name adopted reflected the support of both the city and county authorities; as well as the existence of the University of Canterbury in New Zealand, which officially opposed the use of a name too similar to its own. The abbreviation "UKC" became a popular abbreviation for the university.

=== 1965 to 2000 ===
The University of Kent at Canterbury was granted its Royal Charter on 4 January 1965 and the first group of 500 students arrived on 11 October 1965. On 30 March 1966 Princess Marina, Duchess of Kent was formally installed as the first Chancellor.

The university was envisaged as being a collegiate establishment, with most students living in one of the colleges on campus, and as specialising in inter-disciplinary studies in all fields. Over the years, changes in government policy and other changing demands have largely destroyed this original concept, leading to the present state, which is nearer the norm for a British university. However, the four original colleges – Darwin, Eliot, Keynes and Rutherford – remain, together with the newer Woolf and Turing colleges.

The university grew at a rapid rate throughout the 1960s, with three colleges and many other buildings on campus being completed by the end of the decade. The 1970s saw further construction, but the university also encountered the biggest physical problem in its history. The university had been built above a tunnel on the disused Canterbury and Whitstable Railway. In July 1974 the tunnel collapsed, damaging part of the Cornwallis Building, which sank nearly a metre within about an hour on the evening of 11 July. Fortunately, the university had insurance against subsidence, so it was able to pay for the south-west corner of the building to be demolished and replaced by a new wing at the other end of the building.

Unix computers arrived in 1976 and UKC set up the first Unix to Unix copy (UUCP) test service to Bell Labs in the U.S. in 1979. UKC provided the first UUCO connections to non-academic users in the UK in the early 1980s.

In 1982 the university opened the University Centre at Tonbridge (now the University of Kent at Tonbridge) for its School of Continuing education, helping to enhance the availability of teaching across the county. Building elsewhere included the Park Wood accommodation village and the Darwin houses in 1989.

During the 1990s and 2000s the university expanded beyond its original campus, establishing campuses in Medway, Tonbridge and Brussels, and partnerships with Canterbury College, West Kent College, South Kent College and MidKent College.

=== 2000 to 2026 ===
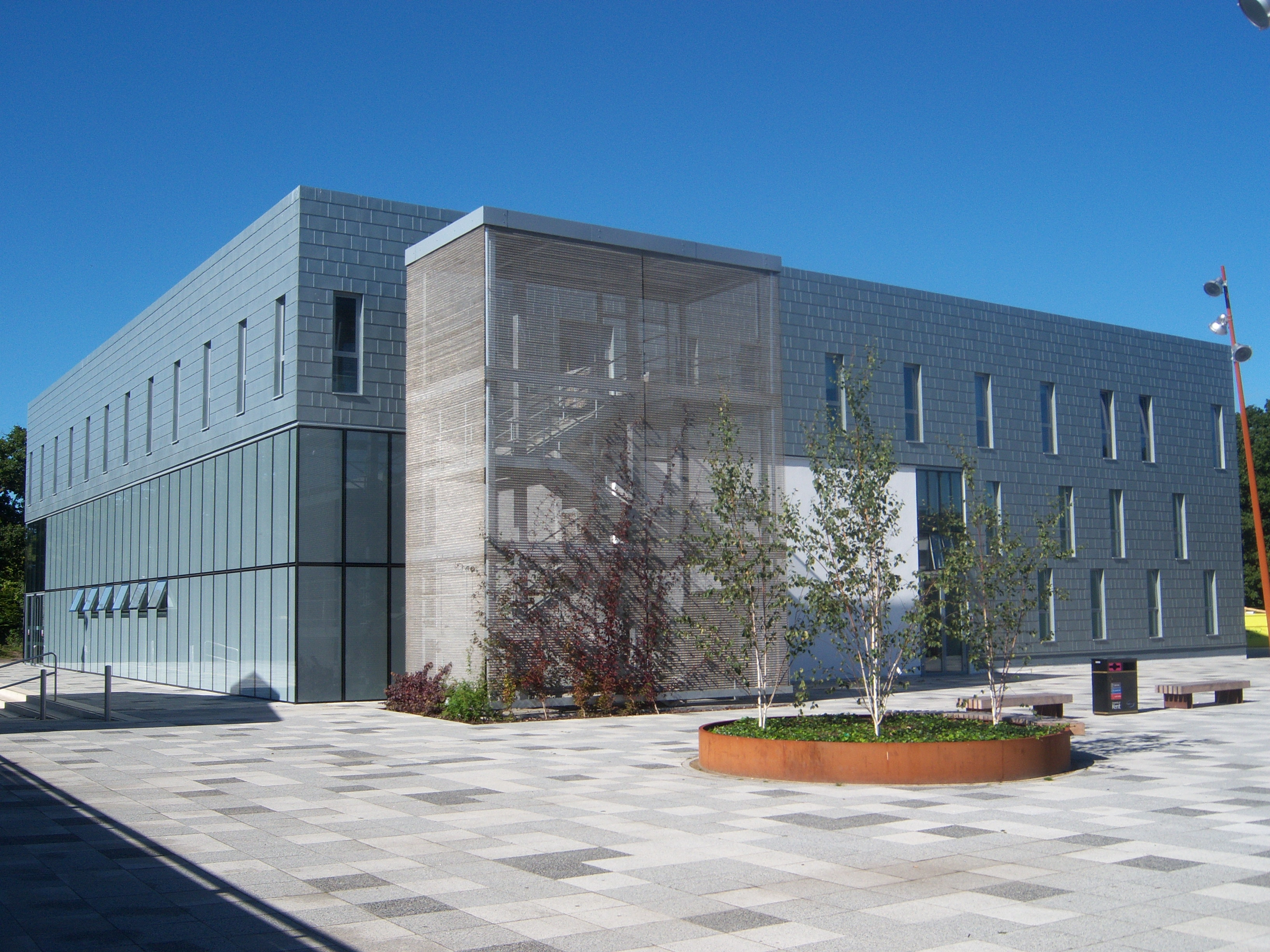
The School of Arts Building at Kent's Canterbury campus; it is one of several buildings constructed by the university in recent years

In the 2000s the university entered a collaboration named Universities at Medway with the University of Greenwich, MidKent College and Canterbury Christ Church University to deliver university provision in the Medway area. This led to the development of the University of Kent at Medway, opened from 2001. Initially based at Mid-Kent College, a new joint campus opened in 2004. Small postgraduate centres opened in Paris in 2009, and later in Rome and Athens.

As a consequence of the expansion outside Canterbury the university's name was formally changed to the University of Kent on 1 April 2003. Part of the original reasoning for the name disappeared when local government reforms in the 1970s resulted in the Canterbury campus falling entirely within the City of Canterbury, which no longer has county borough status, and Kent County Council.

In 2007 the university was rebranded with a new logo and website. The logo was chosen following consultation with existing university students and those in sixth forms across the country.

The University of Kent set its tuition fees for UK and European Union undergraduates at £9,000 for new entrants in 2012, which was approved by the Office for Fair Access (OFFA). The fee was approved by Council on 1 April 2011 and was confirmed by OFFA in July 2011. The proposed changes to UK and EU undergraduate tuition fees did not apply to international student fees.

Following the extension of Keynes College in 2001, two new colleges opened on the Canterbury campus, Woolf College for postgraduates in 2008 and Turing College for undergraduates in 2015. Several other new buildings were also added, including the Jarman School of Arts Building in 2009, the Colyer-Fergusson Music Building, a performing arts space, in 2012, and the Sibson building, housing maths and the business school, in 2017. A major £27m project to extend and refurbish the Templeman Library began in 2013, was completed in 2017 and formally opened in 2018. Additional accommodation was provided for students at the Medway Campus with the completion of Liberty Quays in 2009.

In 2015, the university held a number of events to celebrate its 50th anniversary. Festivals were held in Canterbury and Medway, a summer festival, the funding of twelve Beacon Projects and the temporary erection of a Ferris Wheel on the Canterbury campus. In 2016, a consultation was launched on a masterplan for future development of the Canterbury campus. In March 2017 it was announced that, in partnership with Canterbury Christ Church University, the University of Kent had been given funding to develop Kent and Medway Medical School. In 2023, more than 450 students in the Kent's Students' Union voted in favour of moving all catering to plant-based. The vote follows similar votes at other universities.

The University of Kent saw its first two alumni going on to win Nobel prizes, both for literature: Kazuo Ishiguro (English and Philosophy, 1978) in 2017 and Abdulrazak Gurnah (PhD, 1982) in 2021.

In June 2022, the University of Kent signed a twinning agreement with Kherson State University (KSU) in Ukraine as part of the UK government-backed Universities UK (UUK) initiative. The partnership aims to support KSU during the Russian invasion of Ukraine, providing academic and technical assistance, including online English classes, guest lectures, and research collaboration. This agreement is part of a broader effort by UK universities to support Ukrainian institutions affected by the war.

In 2024, as part of its "Kent 2030" strategy to address financial challenges, the University of Kent announced plans to discontinue six courses: anthropology, art history, health and social care, journalism, music and audio technology, and philosophy. This decision raised concerns among students and staff regarding the potential impact on academic diversity and future career opportunities. In response to the proposed course closures and the planned elimination of 58 jobs, staff at the university voted in favour of strike action. Additionally, a petition to preserve the affected courses garnered over 16,000 signatures. The university's Paris School of Arts and Culture was also closed, with the last cohort graduating in 2025.

A revision of the university's ordinances in June 2025 deleted the section on colleges that had been present up to the 2024 revision, removing them from the university's constitutional documents.

On the 10th September 2025, the university announced plans to merge with the University of Greenwich, with degrees continuing to be awarded under either the Kent or Greenwich name rather than adopting a single unified university designation.

In March 2026, an outbreak of meningitis in Canterbury, including the university's campus, led to the deaths of two people (one a Kent student), while a number of other people were hospitalised.

=== 2026 to present ===
The university merged with the University of Greenwich to form the London and South East University Group on 1 August 2026. The corporation of the University of Kent transferred all of its assets and liabilities to LASE and, under the terms of a revised royal charter that came into effect on 1 August 2026, became run by the council for dissolution, which was charged with winding up the corporation and surrendering the royal charter. From the date of the revised royal charter, the corporation was explicitly stated to have no officers or staff, students' union, senate, court, vice-chancellor or visitor.

== Campuses ==
=== Canterbury campus ===
The main Canterbury campus covers 300 acres (120 hectares) and is situated in parkland in an elevated position just over two miles (three kilometres) from the city centre, with views over the city and Canterbury Cathedral UNESCO world heritage site. The campus currently has approximately 12,000 full-time and 6,200 part-time students, with accommodation for over 5000, in addition to 600 academic and research staff. Residential and academic buildings are intermingled in the central part of the campus, science building are clustered west of Giles Lens and there is a dedicated student village on the western edge, several minutes’ walk from the main campus. The campus is ecologically diverse and home to a number of protected species, including Great Crested Newts. The North West of the site is heavily forested, including pockets of ancient woodland, while the Southern Slopes contain a mix of wildflower and hay meadows, and there are seven ponds spread across the campus.

==== Facilities ====
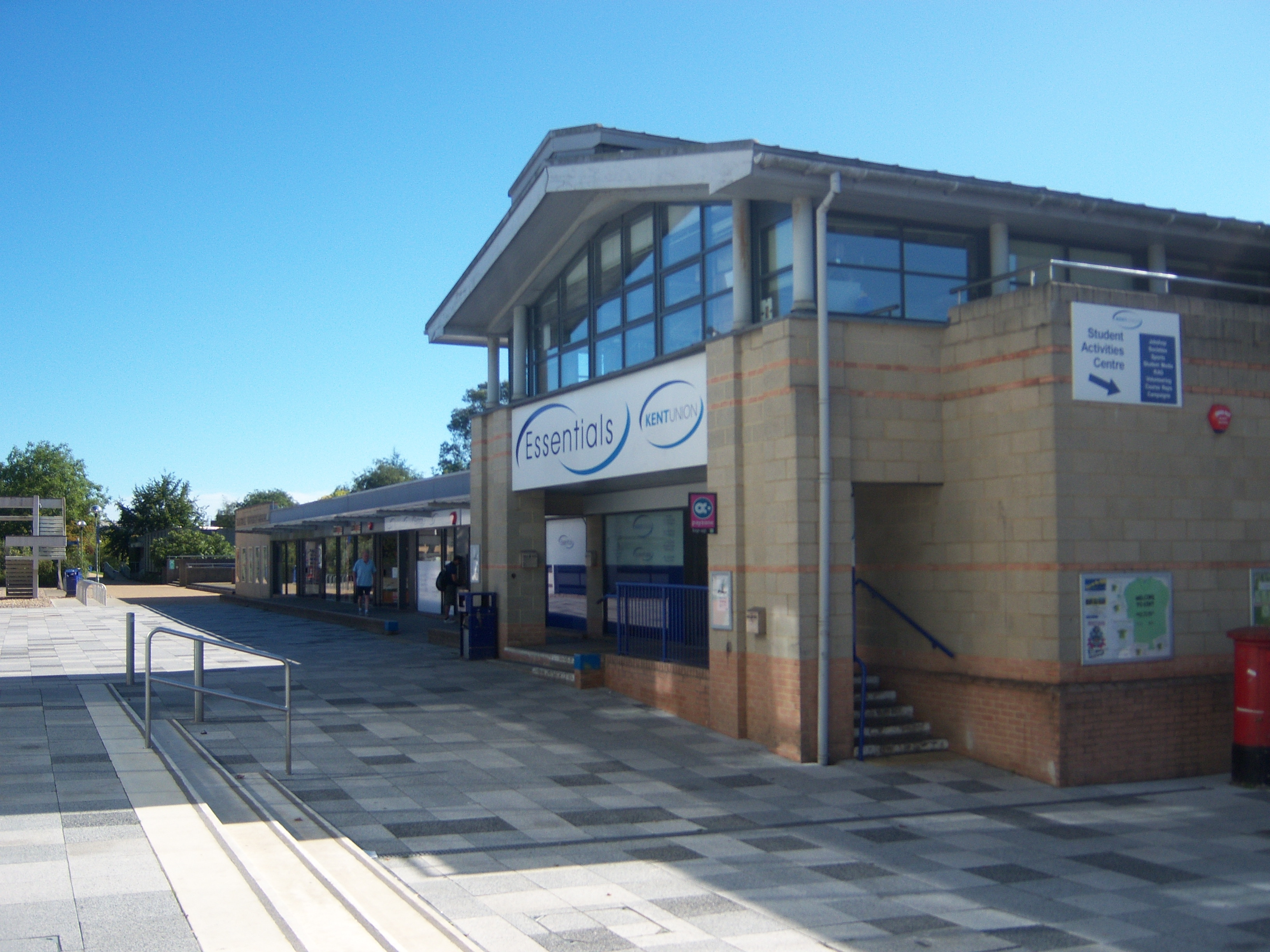
The shops at the Canterbury campus, with the Kent Union offices housed in the offices above

The campus has a selection of shops, including a grocery store, bookshop, pharmacy and launderettes. Food and drink is provided by range of cafes and bars run either by the university or the students' union.

The campus nightclub, The Venue, was refurbished and modernised in 2010.

Sporting facilities are spread across two main sites: the sports centre, which contains several multi-purpose sports halls, a fitness suite, squash courts and climbing wall, and the Sports Pavilion site, with a variety of indoor and outdoor sports pitches and training facilities, including 3G and astroturf.

==== Gulbenkian arts complex ====
The Gulbenkian arts complex includes a theatre and cinema, as well as a small stage which hosts monthly comedy nights as well as occasional shows such as Jazz at Five and The Chortle Student Comedy Awards. The adjacent Colyer-Fergusson Building, which opened in 2013, includes an adaptable format concert/rehearsal hall with retractable seating and variable acoustics and practice rooms. The Gulbenkian Theatre seats 340 and presents student, professional and amateur shows throughout the year. The theatre was opened in 1969 and was named after the Calouste Gulbenkian Foundation which helped fund its construction. The Gulbenkian Cinema is an independent cinema in the Gulbenkian complex open to students and the general public. It is Kent's regional film theatre showing new mainstream and non-mainstream releases as well as archive and foreign language films. In the daytime the cinema is used as a lecture theatre for University students. The Gulbenkian complex also hosts a cafe/ bar and restaurant facility open to students, staff and the general public.

==== Transport and access ====
The campus is accessed by road from either the West, with two entrances on the A290 Whitstable Road, or the East, via St Stephen's Hill. An off-road foot and cycle route connects the central campus to the Northern edge of the city, and a regular bus services (‘UniBus’) is also in operation, although with a more limited service outside of term time. The A2 dual carriageway links the campus and city to London, the port at Dover and the national motorway network. The campus also lies at the southern end of the Crab and Winkle Way, a 7-mile off-road foot and cycle path running through farm and woodland to the coastal fishing town of Whitstable, providing a link for cycle commuters.

The closest railway station to the campus is Canterbury West which is, as of 2009, served by Southeastern services to London St Pancras. These services stop at Ashford International en route, thus providing a direct connection to Eurostar services to France and Belgium. Southeastern services also connect Canterbury West and Canterbury East stations with London Victoria and Charing Cross. Both of the Canterbury stations can be accessed by the UniBus service. The nearest international air services are provided from the London airports, Gatwick and Heathrow, with indirect National Express coach services to both from Canterbury Bus Station with one transfer at London Victoria Coach Station. The campus is also served by two coach services (Route 007) to/from London each day, with further services operating from Canterbury bus station.

=== Medway campus ===
In 2000 the university joined with other educational institutes to form the "Universities for Medway" initiative, aimed at increasing participation in higher education in the Medway Towns. The following year the University of Kent at Medway formally opened, initially based at Mid-Kent College. By 2004 a new campus for the university had been established in the old Chatham Dockyard, sharing a campus with Canterbury Christchurch University and University of Greenwich.

The University of Kent and Medway Park Sports Centre have gone into a partnership to provide leisure facilities for university students and the general public. Medway Park (formerly the Black Lion Leisure Centre) was re-opened in 2011 by Princess Anne for use as a training venue for the 2012 London Olympics, as well as a training venue for the Egyptian and Congo National teams.

The campus accommodation, called Pier Quays, formerly named Liberty Quays until 2019 when Unite Group acquired Liberty Living, was finished in late 2009, and caters for over 600 students. The accommodation building includes a Tesco Express, Subway, and Domino's Pizza, and Cargo, a bar showing sports, live music, and entertainment.

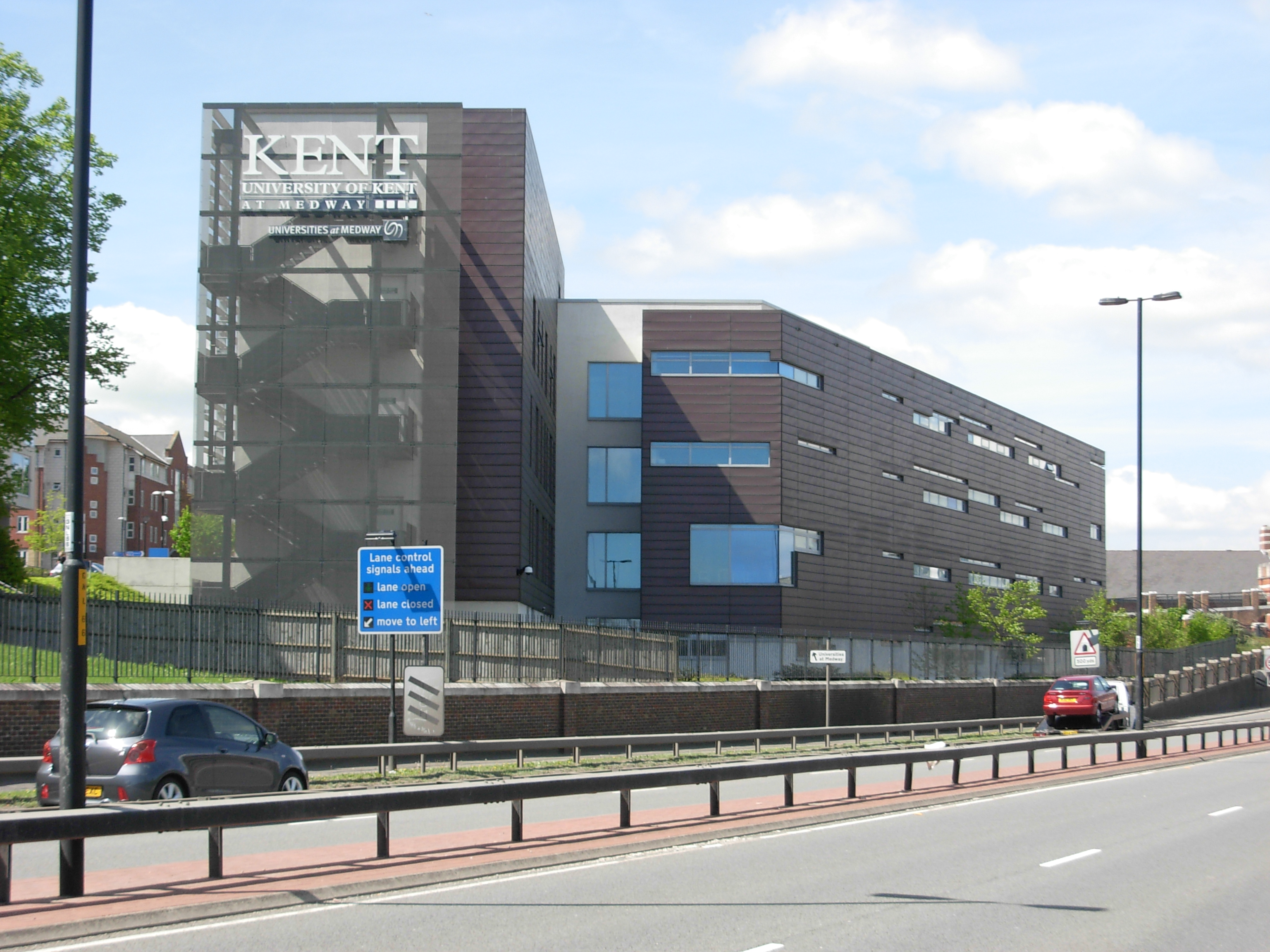
View from Pier Road

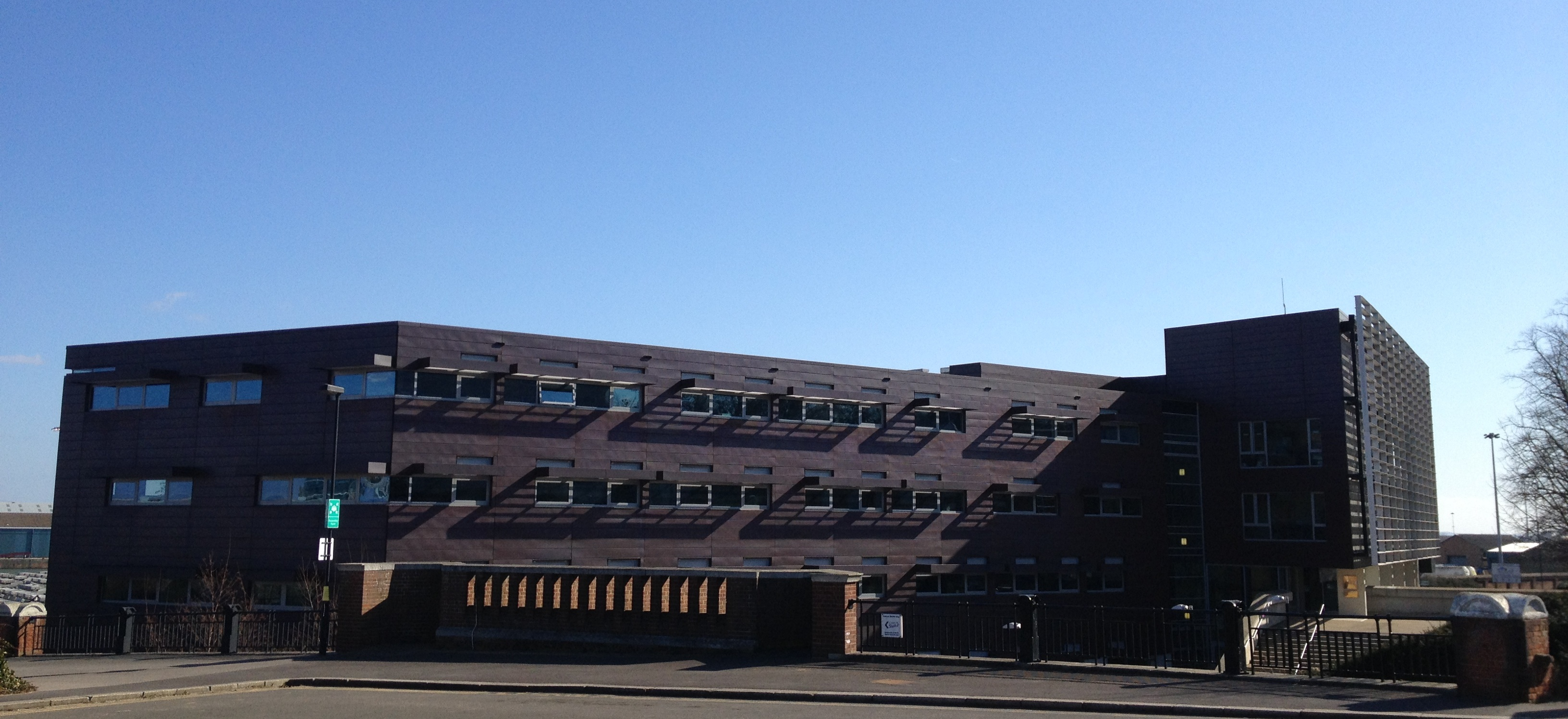
Medway Building at Medway campus

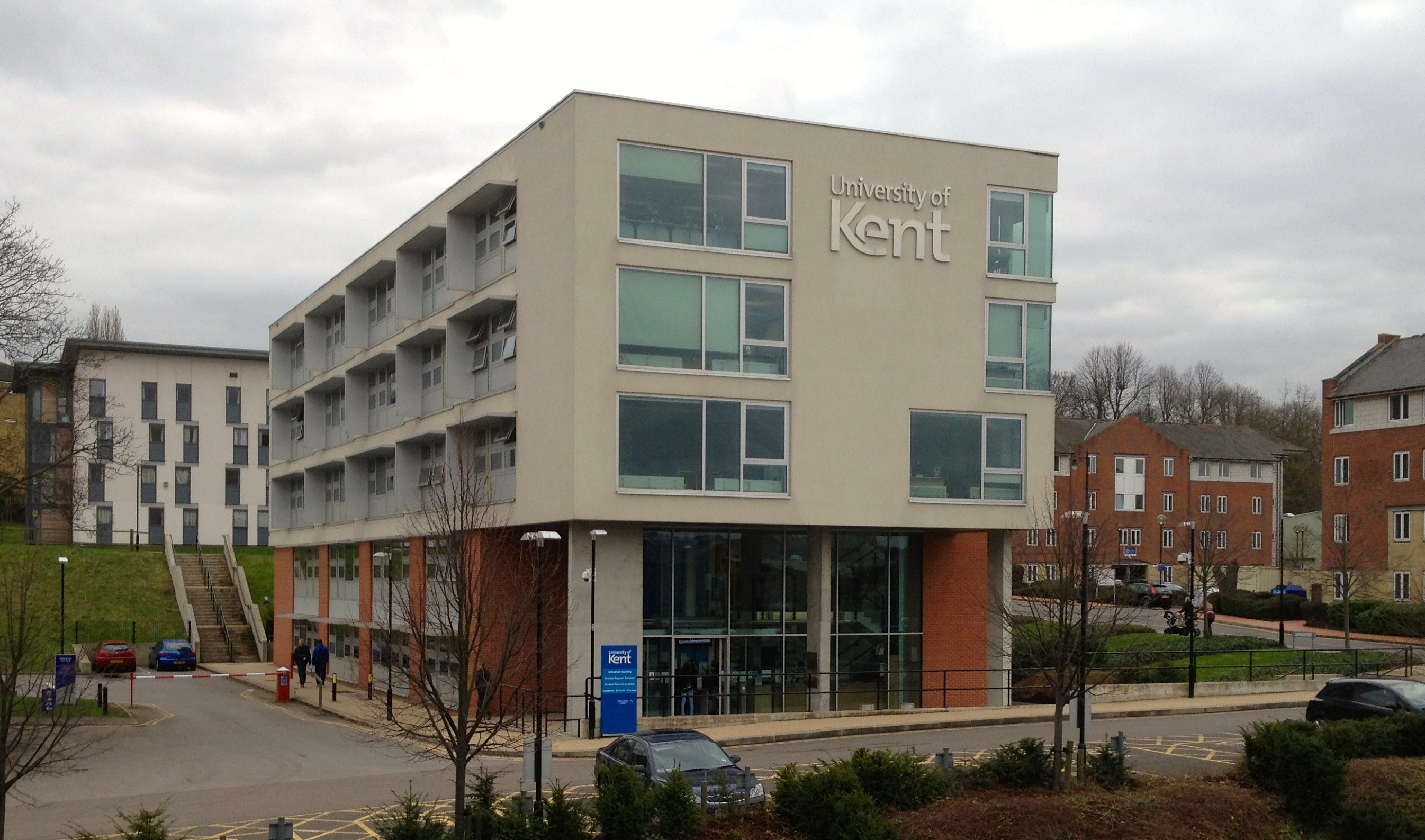
Gillingham Building at Medway campus

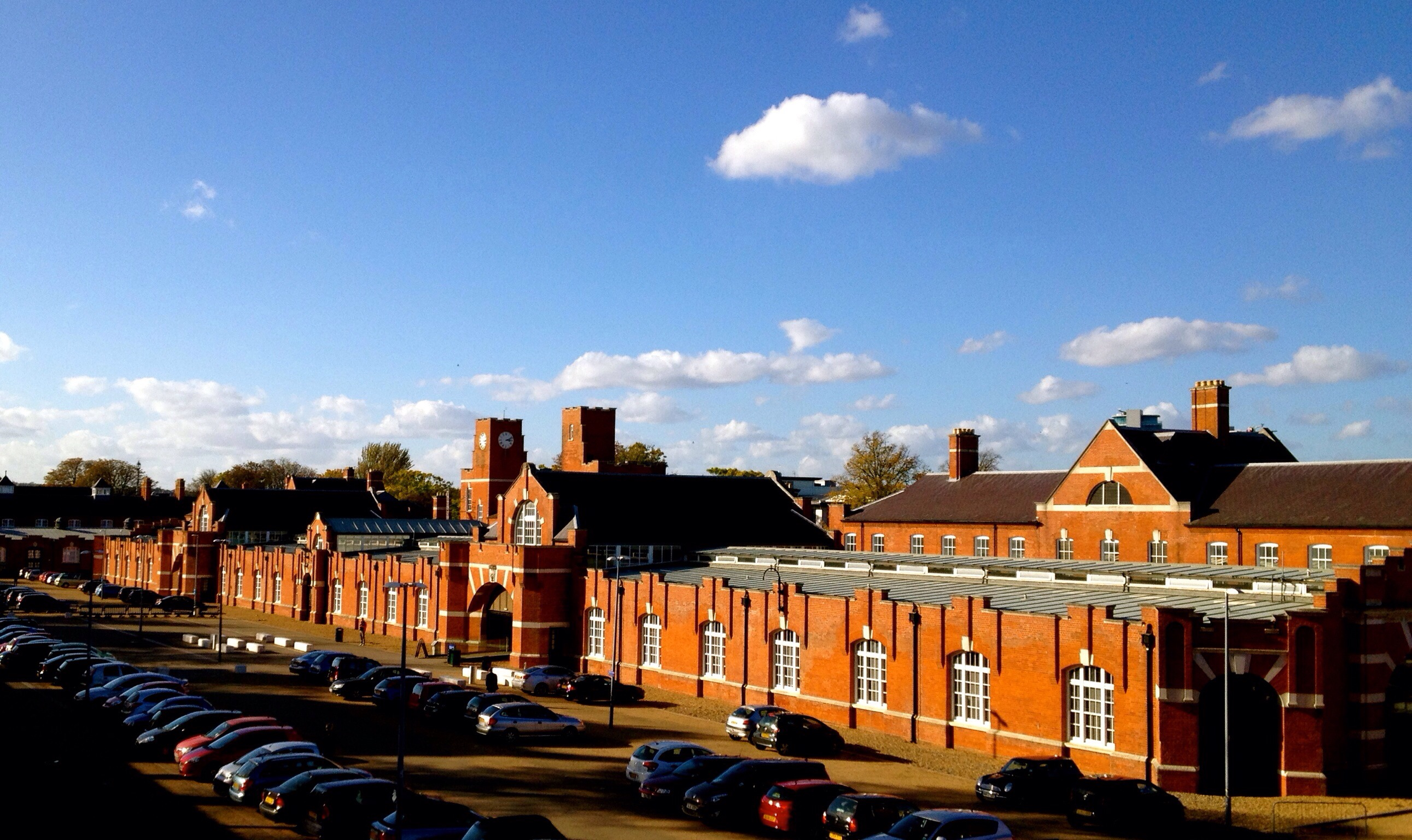
Drill Hall Library, sharing with Universities at Medway

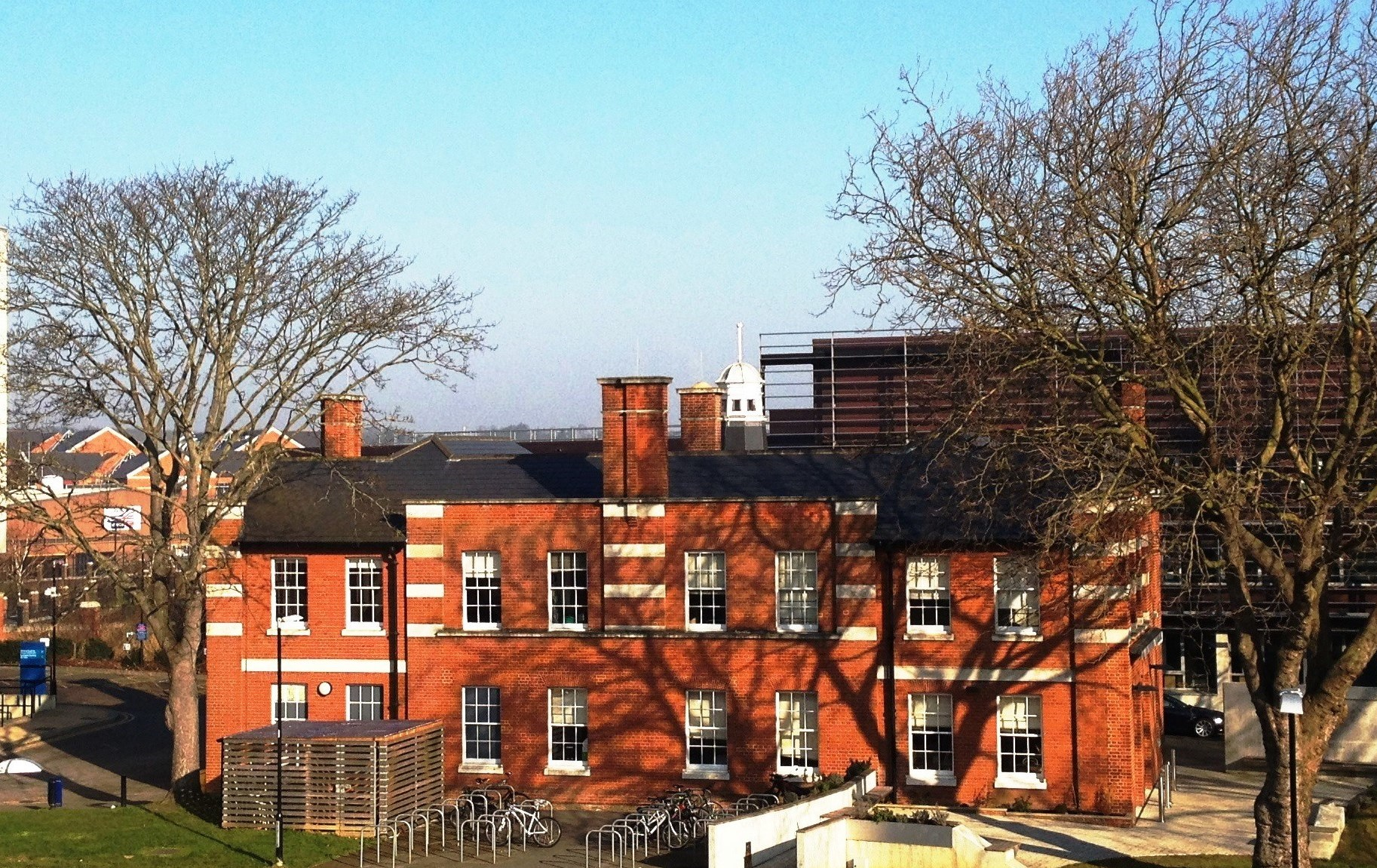
Rochester Building at Medway campus

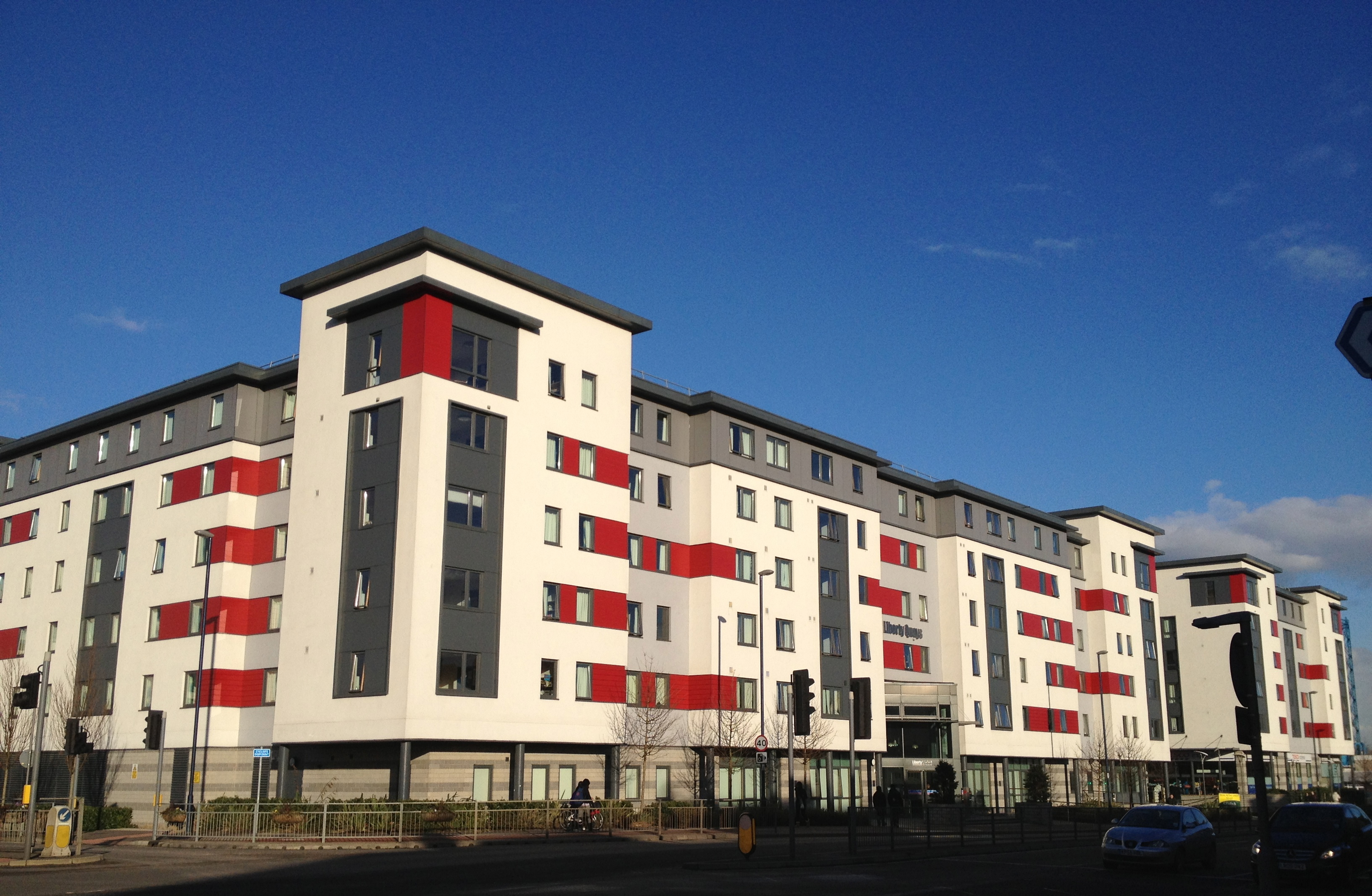
Pier Quays accommodation

=== Tonbridge campus ===
In 1982 the university established the School of continuing education in the centre of Tonbridge, extending its coverage to the entire county of Kent. Many buildings were added in the 1980s and 1990s. The campus is now called the University of Kent at Tonbridge. It collaborates with the Kent Business School and Kent Innovation and Enterprise.

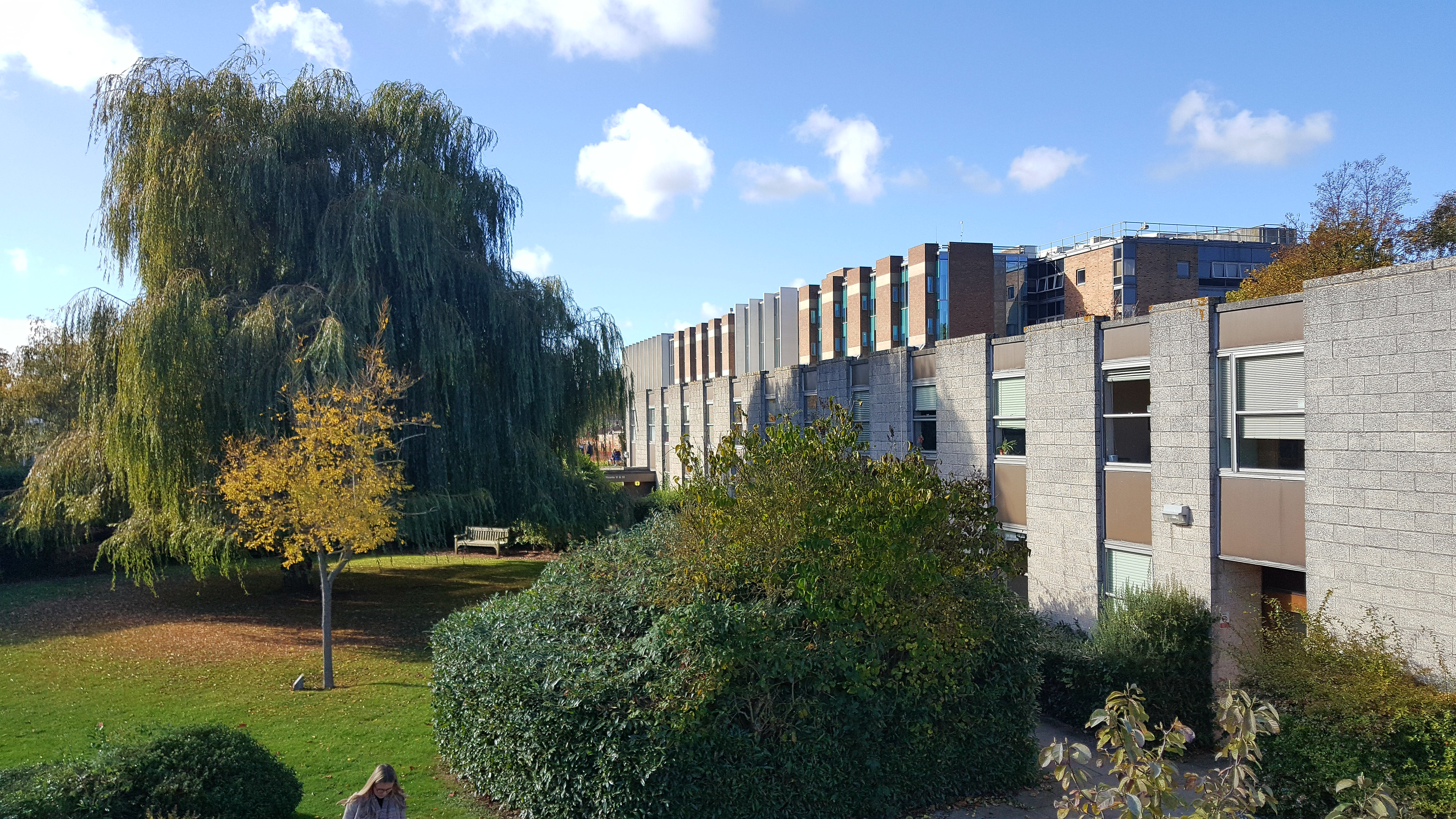
Overlooking the main Library from Rutherford Extension

== Organisation and administration ==
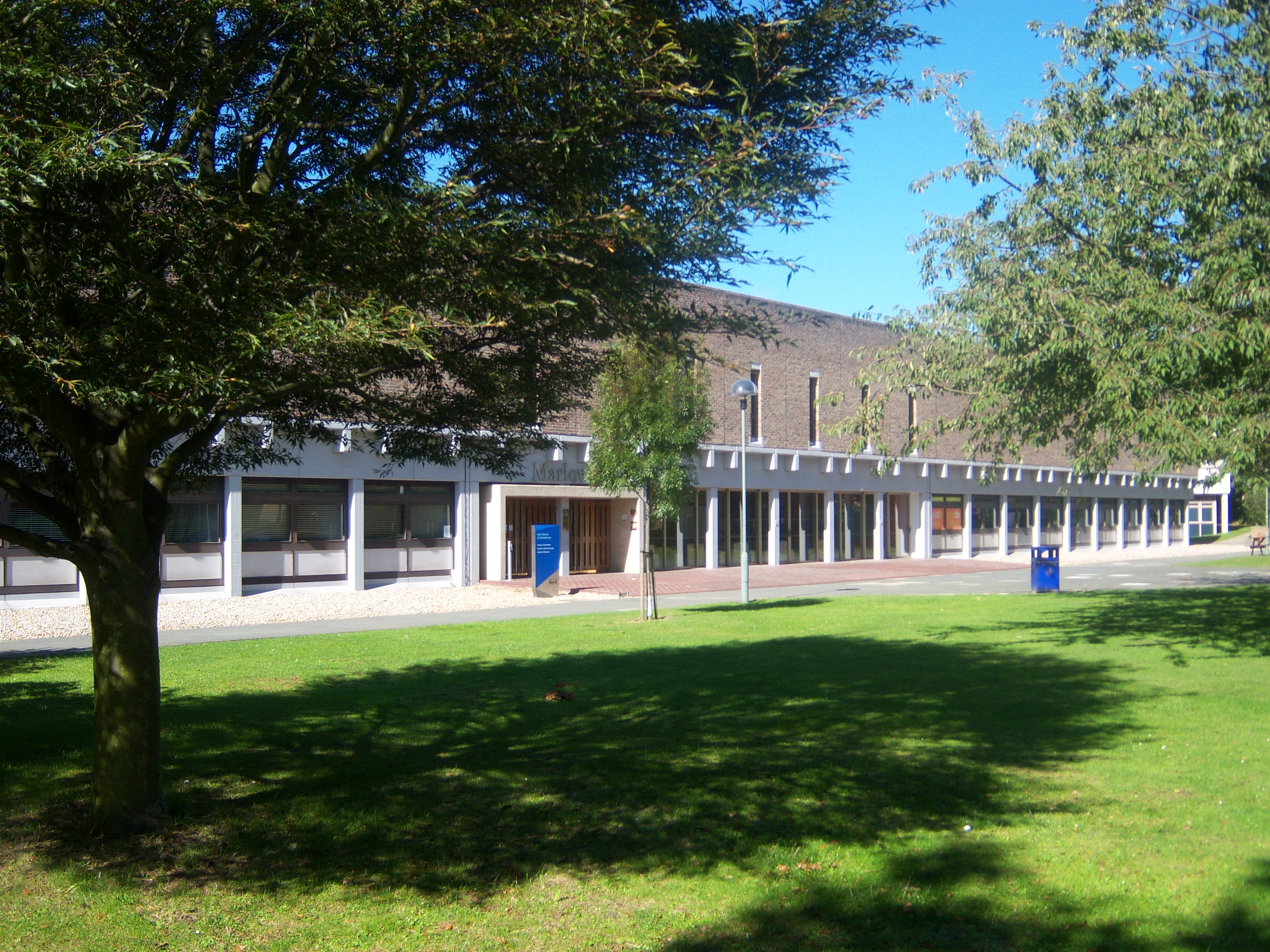
The Marlowe Building, formerly the Physics Department and now (as of February 2024) home to Faculty Offices, the School of Architecture and the School of Anthropology and Conservation

The university is an academic division within LASE, operating under a trading name as the University of Kent. LASE holds the degree-awarding power of the institution, and has been permitted by the Office for Students to award degrees under the name of the University of Kent. The teaching and research of the university, including academic quality, the admission and regulation of students and the award of degrees, is overseen by the academic board of LASE.

=== Faculties, departments and schools ===
In 2020, because of financial pressures caused by a combination of the 2000 demographic dip and the 2020/21 COVID-19 pandemic, the university abolished the faculties and reorganised itself into six divisions (see below).

Division of arts and humanities

- Kent School of Architecture and Planning
- School of arts
- School of English
- School of European culture and languages
- School of history
- Centre for music and audio technology

Division of natural sciences

- School of bioscience
- School of physics and astronomy
- School of chemistry and forensic science
- School of sport and exercise sciences
- Medway School of Pharmacy
- Kent and Medway Medical School

Division of computing, engineering and mathematical sciences

- School of computing
- School of engineering and digital arts
- School of mathematics, statistics and actuarial science

Kent Business School

Division of human and social sciences

- School of anthropology and conservation
- School of economics
- School of politics and international relations
- School of psychology

Division for the study of law, society and social justice

- Kent Law School
- School of social policy, sociology and social research
- Centre for journalism

Until 2020, the university was divided into three faculties: humanities, sciences and social sciences, which were further sub-divided into 20 schools.

The original plan was to have no academic sub-divisions within the three faculties (initially humanities, social sciences and natural sciences) and to incorporate an interdisciplinary element to all degrees through common first year courses ("part I") in each faculty, followed by specialist study in the second and final years ("part II"). The lack of departments encouraged the development of courses that crossed traditional divides, such as chemical physics, chemistry with control engineering, biological chemistry and environmental physical science.

However, the interdisciplinary approach proved increasingly complex for two reasons. The levels of specialisation at A Levels meant that many students had not studied particular subjects for some years and this made it impossible to devise a course that both covered areas unstudied by some and did not bore others. This proved an especial problem in natural sciences, where many mathematics students had not studied chemistry at A Level and vice versa.

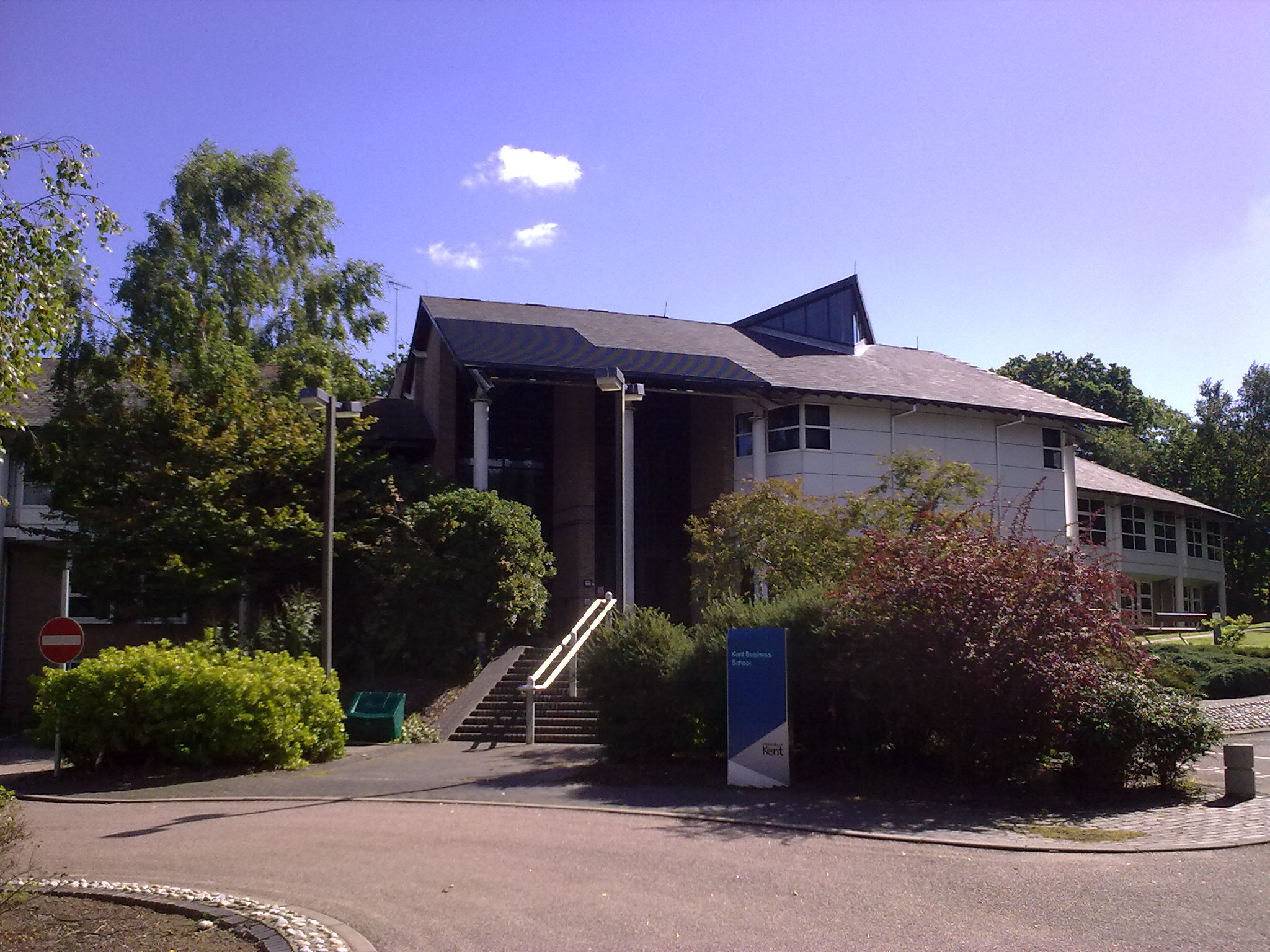
Kent Business School

Additionally many subjects, particularly those in the social sciences, were not taught at A Level and required the first year as a grounding in the subject rather than an introduction to several different new subjects. Problems were especially encountered in the faculty of natural sciences where the differing demands of mathematics and physical sciences led to two almost completely separate programmes and student bases. In 1970 this led to the creation of the school of mathematical studies, standing outside the faculties. The addition of other subjects led to increased pressure on common part I programmes and increasingly students took more specialised part I courses designed to prepare them for part II study.

Substantial change to this structure did not come until the 1990s, driven more by national government policy than curricular demands, which were, after all, very flexible by nature. In 1989 the Universities Funding Council, which was merged into the Higher Education Funding Council for England (HEFCE) in 1992, was charged by the UK Government to determine the cost for teaching each subject. To meet these accountancy requirements, Kent required for the first time that each member of staff declare a single discipline they would be affiliated with in future. When departments were formed in the early 1990s this led to a great deal of reorganisation of staff, and destroyed many existing inter-disciplinary relationships. Following the formation of departments, finance was devolved to departments based on how many students were taught. This quickly evolved into undermining the interdisciplinary context further, as departments sought to control finance by increasing the amount of specialist teaching in the first year.

The university now has the faculties further divided into 18 departments and schools, ranging from the school of English to the department of biosciences, and from the Kent Law School to the department of economics. Also of note is the university's Brussels School of International Studies, located in Brussels, Belgium. The school offers master's degrees in international relations theory and international conflict analysis, along with an LLM in international law. In 2005 a new department, the Kent School of Architecture, began teaching its first students. In 2008, Wye College came under Kent's remit, in joint partnership with Imperial College London.

=== Colleges ===
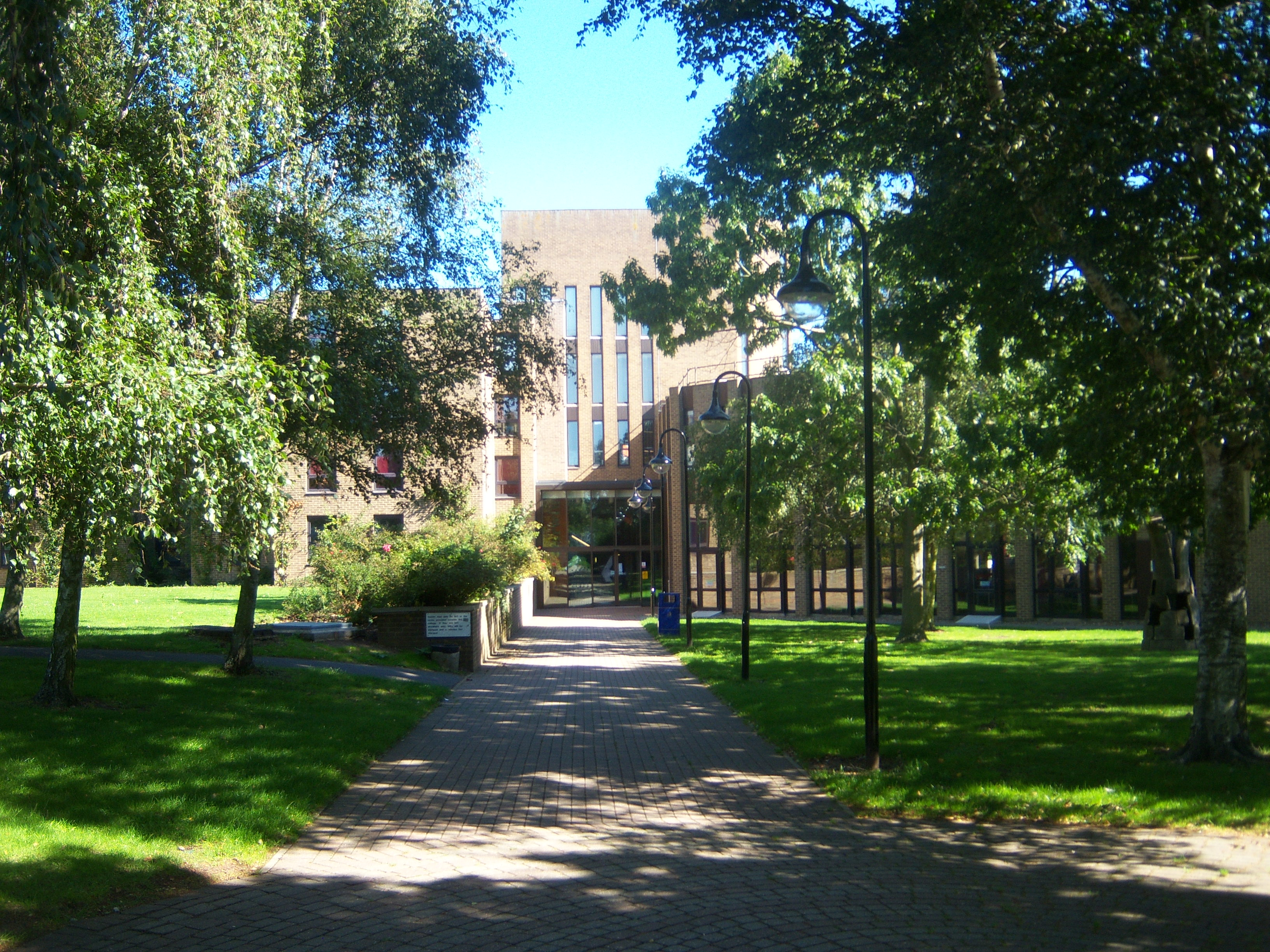
Darwin College

The university was formerly divided into eight colleges, six colleges named after distinguished scholars, one college after a town and one named after a student village. As of 2025, colleges have been removed from the university's constitutional documents. Colleges had academic schools, lecture theatres, seminar rooms and halls of residence. Each college had a master, who was responsible for student welfare within their college. In chronological order of construction they were:

Name	Foundation	Named after
Eliot College	1965	T. S. Eliot
Rutherford College	1966	Ernest Rutherford
Keynes College	1968	John Maynard Keynes
Darwin College	1970	Charles Darwin
Park Wood College	1989 (became a college in 2022)	Park Wood
Medway College	2000	Medway
Woolf College	2008	Virginia Woolf
Turing College	2014	Alan Turing

The university also has an associate college named Chaucer College.

There was much discussion about the names adopted for most of the colleges with the following alternative names all in consideration at one point or another: for Eliot: Caxton, after William Caxton; for Keynes: Richborough, a town in Kent; Anselm, a former archbishop of Canterbury; and for Darwin: Anselm (again); Attlee, after Clement Attlee, the post-war Prime Minister; Becket, after Thomas Becket, another former archbishop (this was the recommendation of the college's provisional committee but rejected by the Senate); Conrad; Elgar, after Edward Elgar; Maitland; Marlowe, after Christopher Marlowe; Russell, after Bertrand Russell (this was the recommendation of the Senate but rejected by the council); Tyler, after both Wat Tyler and Tyler Hill on which the campus stands. The name for the college proved especially contentious and was eventually decided by a postal ballot of members of the Senate, choosing from: Attlee, Conrad, Darwin, Elgar, Maitland, Marlowe and Tyler. (Both Becket and Tyler were eventually used as the names for residential buildings on campuses and the building housing both the Architecture and Anthropology departments is named Marlowe.)

Each college had residential rooms, lecture theatres, study rooms, computer rooms and social areas. The intention of the colleges was that they should not be just Halls of residence, but complete academic communities. Each college (except Woolf) had its own bar, all rebuilt on a larger scale, and originally its own dining hall (only Rutherford still had a functioning dining hall; Darwin's is hired out for conferences and events; Keynes's was closed in 2000 and converted into academic space, but in 2011 Dolche Vita was expanded and became the dining hall for Keynes students in catered accommodation after Keynes's expansion in 2011; and Eliot's was closed in 2006). It was expected that each college (more were planned) would have around 600 students as members, with an equivalent proportion of staff, with half the students living within the college itself and the rest coming onto campus to eat and study within their colleges. Many facilities, ranging from accommodation, tutorials and alumni relations, would be handled on a college basis. With no planned academic divisions below the Faculty level, the colleges would be main focus of students' lives and there would be no units of a similar or smaller size to provide a rival focus of loyalties.

This vision of a collegiate university increasingly fell away. The funding for colleges did not keep pace with the growth in student numbers, with the result that only four colleges were built. In later years when there was heavy student demand for scarce accommodation in Canterbury the solution was found in building additional on-campus accommodation but not in the form of further colleges. The hopes that students living off campus would stay around to eat dinner in their colleges were not met, whilst the abolition of college amenities fees removed students' direct stake in their colleges. With the growth of specialist subject departments as well as of other university wide facilities, more and more of the role of colleges was transferred to the central university. Accommodation and catering were transferred to the centralised University of Kent at Canterbury Hospitality (UKCH).

Eventually, the university ceased to operate as a traditional collegiate university – applications were made to the university as a whole, and many of the colleges relied on each other for day-to-day operation. Academic departments had no formal ties to colleges other than those that are located within particular college buildings due to availability of space, with lectures, seminars and tutorials taking place wherever there was an available room rather than on a college basis. Many students were allocated accommodation in their respective college, but some were housed in developments with no defined collegiate link whilst others were housed in different colleges. College masters were abolished in 2020.

As of 2025, the university is no longer constitutionally collegiate, and only three of the offered residences still bear the names of colleges – Darwin, Keynes and Woolf.

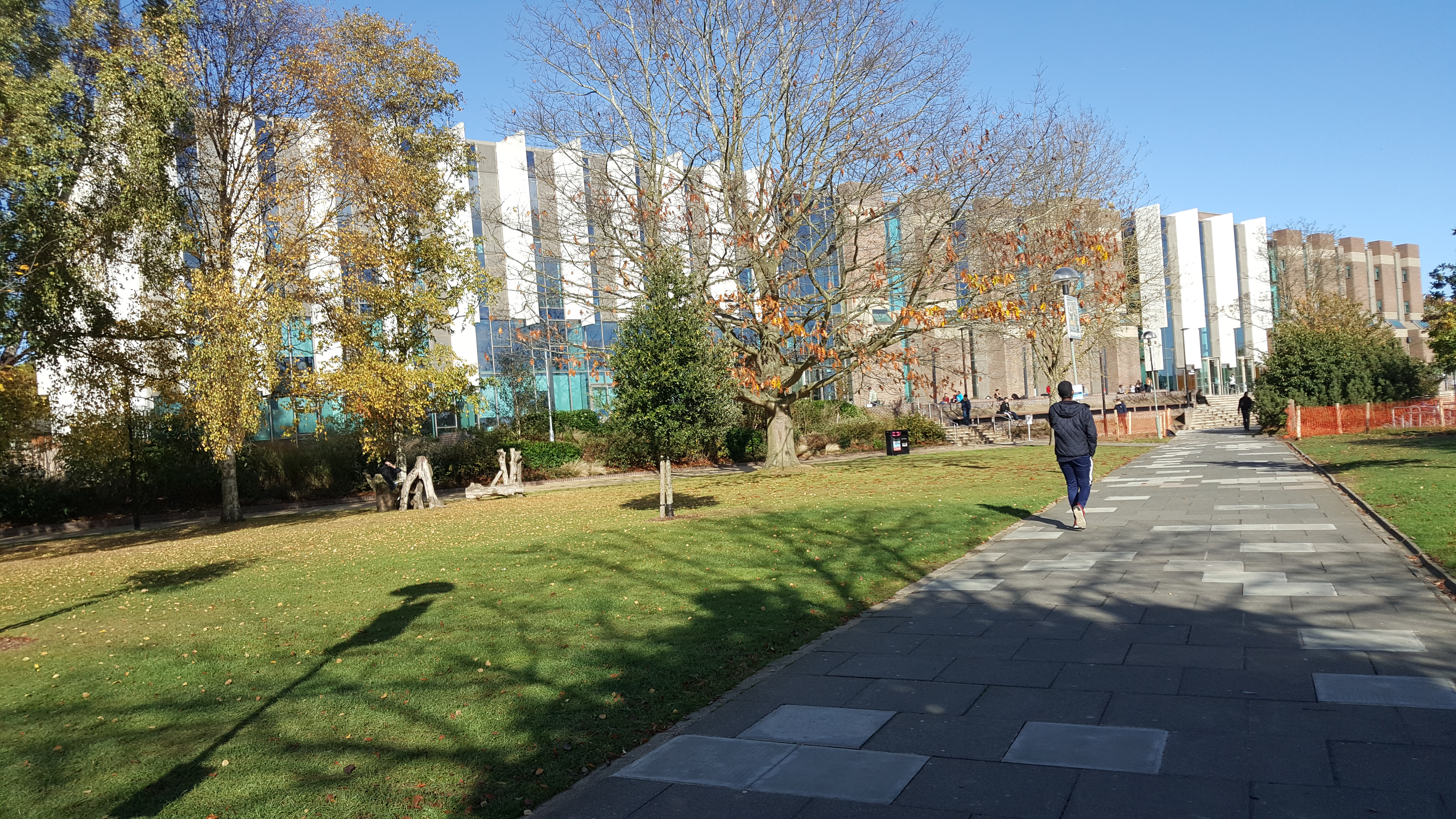
The newly renovated Templeman Library at the heart of campus

=== Finances ===
In the financial year ended 31 July 2013, the University of Kent had a total income (including share of joint ventures) of £201.3 million, grew by 5.8% with an additional £21.4 million of fee income (2011/12 – £190.2 million) and total expenditure of £188.7 million (2011/12 – £175.9 million). Key sources of income included £98.5 million from tuition fees and education contracts (2011/12 – £77.2 million), £48.9 million from Funding Council grants (2011/12 – £62.5 million), £13.4 million from research grants and contracts (2011/12 – £11.4 million) and £1.2 million from endowment and investment income (2011/12 – £1.09 million). During the 2012/13 financial year the University of Kent had a capital expenditure of £28.2 million (2011/12 – £16.1 million).

At year end the University of Kent had endowment assets of £6.3 million (2011/12 – £6.04 million) and total net assets of £175.9 million (2011/12 – £165.1 million).

The annual income of the institution for 2021–22 was £260.4 million of which £17.7 million was from research grants and contracts, with an expenditure of £326.7 million.

=== Coat of arms and logo ===
The University of Kent's coat of arms was granted by the College of Arms in September 1967. The white horse of Kent is taken from the arms of the County of Kent (and can also be seen on the Flag of Kent). The three Cornish choughs, originally belonging to the arms of Thomas Becket, were taken from the arms of the City of Canterbury. The Crest depicts the West Gate of Canterbury with a symbolic flow of water, presumably the Great Stour, below it. Two golden Bishops' Crosiers in the shape of a St. Andrews Cross are shown in front of it. The supporters – lions with the sterns of golden ships – are taken from the arms of the Cinque Ports.

The coat of arms is now formally used only for degree certificates, degree programmes and some merchandise, as a result of the university seeking a consistent identity branding.

The university logo pre-2007

The university logo post-2007

The official coat of arms of the University of Kent

== Academic profile ==
=== Research ===
Kent is a research-led university with 24 schools and 40 specialist research centres spanning the sciences, technology, medical studies, the social sciences, arts and humanities. In the 2021 Research Excellence Framework (REF), which assesses the quality of research in UK higher education institutions, Kent is ranked 38th by GPA and 32nd for research power (the grade point average score of a university, multiplied by the full-time equivalent number of researchers submitted). In the 2014 REF, the University of Kent was ranked 40th out of 128 participating institutions in a 'grade point average' league table in The Times Higher Education Supplement (falling from 31st in 2008), 30th in terms of 'Research Power' (rising from 40th in 2008), and 19th in terms of 'Research Intensity' (rising from 49th in 2008). The university had a total research income of £17.7 million in the 2021-22 academic year.

=== Reputation and rankings ===
Rankings
National rankings
- Complete (2027): 62
- Guardian (2027): 107
- Times / Sunday Times (2027): 64

Global rankings
- ARWU (2026): 401–500
- QS (2027): 415
- THE (2026): 401–500

For 2020, The Guardian newspaper ranked Kent 65th in the UK, while The Sunday Times Good University Guide 2018 put Kent in 25th place, as did The Independent's Complete University Guide. QS placed Kent 46th in the UK and 366th in the world, while Times Higher Education placed it 44th in the UK and in the 301–350 group worldwide. In The Sunday Times 10-year (1998–2007) average ranking of British universities based on consistent league table performance, Kent was ranked 48th overall in the UK. In 2015, Kent ranked ahead of 10 Russell Group universities according to the ranking of The Complete University Guide. In research, both The Guardian and The Times newspapers ranked Kent 29th, with The Independent rating the university 28th for its overall research activity in 2014.

The National Student Survey in 2017 placed Kent joint 20th in the UK, with an overall satisfaction of 90%.

In the Times Higher Education's assessment of the 2021 Research Excellence Framework, the History department at Kent was ranked first in the country.

=== Library ===
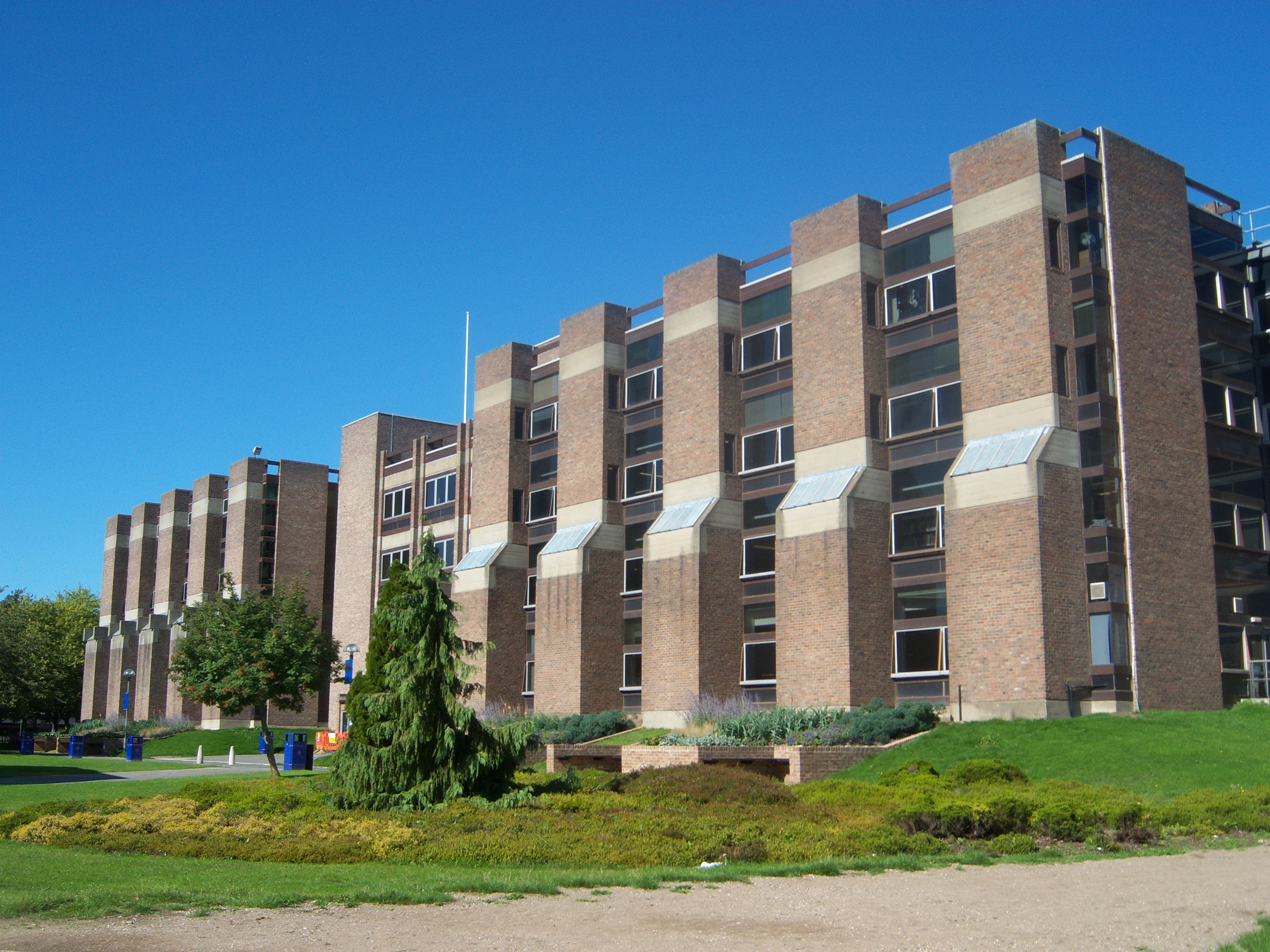
The Templeman Library, which sits at the heart of the Canterbury Campus. The upper floors offer views of the city of Canterbury.

The Templeman Library (named after Geoffrey Templeman, the university's first Vice-Chancellor) contains over a million items in stock including books, journals, videos, DVDs, and archive materials (for example, a full text of The Times from 1785 onwards), yet it is still only half its planned size. It has a materials fund of approximately £1million a year, and adds 12,000 items every year. It is open every day in term time, on a 24/7 basis. It receives 800,000 visits a year, with approximately half a million loans per annum.

The library also houses the British Cartoon Archive, (established 1975) a national collection of political and social cartoons, with over 90,000 images catalogued and an extensive collection of related books.

In 2013 work began to extend, refurbish and completely modernise the Templeman Library, including the addition of study space, along with the creation of a new purpose-built lecture theatre. Additionally, the Library facade underwent major renovation. This work was completed in 2017, with additional refurbishment work planned for 2018.

=== Franco-British programme ===
The bilingual Franco-British double-degree programme combines subjects in one degree and is taught in two countries. The first year is spent at the Institut d'études politiques de Lille (IEP), the second and third years at the University of Kent, the fourth year at the IEP of Lille and the fifth is spent in Canterbury, Brussels or Lille.

The students of the Franco-British double-degree programme receive, at the end of the fourth year, the Bachelor of Arts (BA) degree from the University of Kent, the Diplôme by the IEP of Lille and, at the end of the fifth year, either the Master of Arts (MA) degree in Canterbury or in Brussels or the Master delivered by the IEP of Lille, chosen between 14 parcours de formation by the IEP of Lille.

== Student life ==
=== Admissions and enrolment ===
UCAS Admission Statistics
	2022	2021	2020	2019	2018
Applications (Note: Main scheme applications, International and UK)	20,080	21,440	22,245	22,450	27,620
Accepted	4,580	4,715	4,870	4,640	5,065
Applications/Accepted Ratio	4.38	4.55	4.57	4.84	5.45
Offer Rate (%) (Note: UK domiciled applicants)	89.8	90.2	88.6	86.5	83.2
Average Entry Tariff	—N/a	127	123	125	125

The student population is mixed, with around 15,000 undergraduates and 4,000 postgraduates, with approximately 22% of students coming from overseas. Approximately 128 different nationalities are currently represented, and the female to male ratio is 55 women to every 45 men.

New students entering the university in 2021 had an average of 127 points (the equivalent of BBB-ABB at A Level). According to the 2023 Times and Sunday Times Good University Guide, approximately 4% of Kent's undergraduates come from independent schools.

=== Students' Union ===
The Students' Union, officially known as "Kent Union", is the student representative body for students at the university. It is led by five elected full-time officers (the 'sabbatical team'), a Board of trustees, part-time student officers and 'lay' members of the local community and business selected for their specialist expertise.

The university has two Co-Op shops, one in the main campus area, and the other in Park Wood student village. The two all-purpose food and essentials stores were previously known Essentials and Parkwood Essentials. The Union also operates the Park Wood bar Woody's and a 1,500 capacity nightclub The Venue which, unusually, is located on the central campus. Essentials, the Venue and other shops and Union offices are located in purpose-made buildings completed in 1998. Kent Union also co-ordinates over 200 sports clubs and societies, as well as media outlets, volunteering and charity activities, and provides student welfare services.

The Students' Union has hosted concerts by bands including Led Zeppelin and The Who.

==== Demonstrations ====
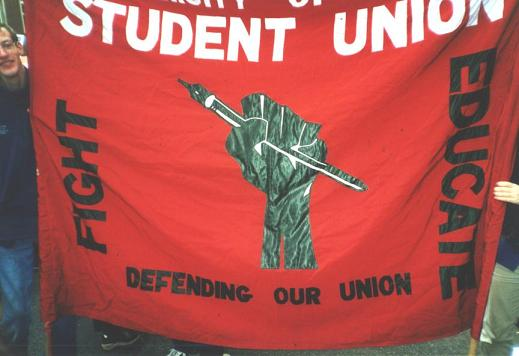
The former banner of Kent Union, featuring the Union's old logo

In early March 1970 a General Meeting of the University of Kent at Canterbury Students' Union voted to occupy the Cornwallis Building as part of a national student movement to open personal records to individual student scrutiny. The occupation lasted about two weeks, with a majority vote ending the occupation on 18 March. Approximately 400 students marched out of the Cornwallis Building to present a set of demands that were handed by Union President David Lawrence to the University Registrar Mr Eric Fox. The demands had been drawn up and debated by groups of up to 300 students at a time in meetings and seminars held throughout the occupation.

In the early to mid-1970s, along with other plate-glass universities, the Union had a reputation for revolutionary politics, leading to demands for law changes from some staff trade unionists. It was active in anti-poll tax, anti-student loans and anti-racism campaigns as well as safety campaigns on campus in the late 1980s.

In 2003, ahead of the 'Top Up Fees' vote, the Union took 300 students to take part in the NUS UK Student Demonstrations on three double decker buses. The Union covered all the transport costs to the demonstration. In 2010, ahead of a parliamentary vote on issues concerning raising tuition fees, the Union took part in the national demonstrations. The union heavily subsidised the transport for 500 students to get to London.

=== Chaplaincy ===
Whilst the university is secular, there is a chaplaincy consisting of permanent Anglican and Catholic priests and a Pentecostal minister, as well as part-time chaplains from other denominations and faiths. The chaplaincy runs the annual Carol Service that takes place every year in Canterbury Cathedral at the end of Autumn Term.

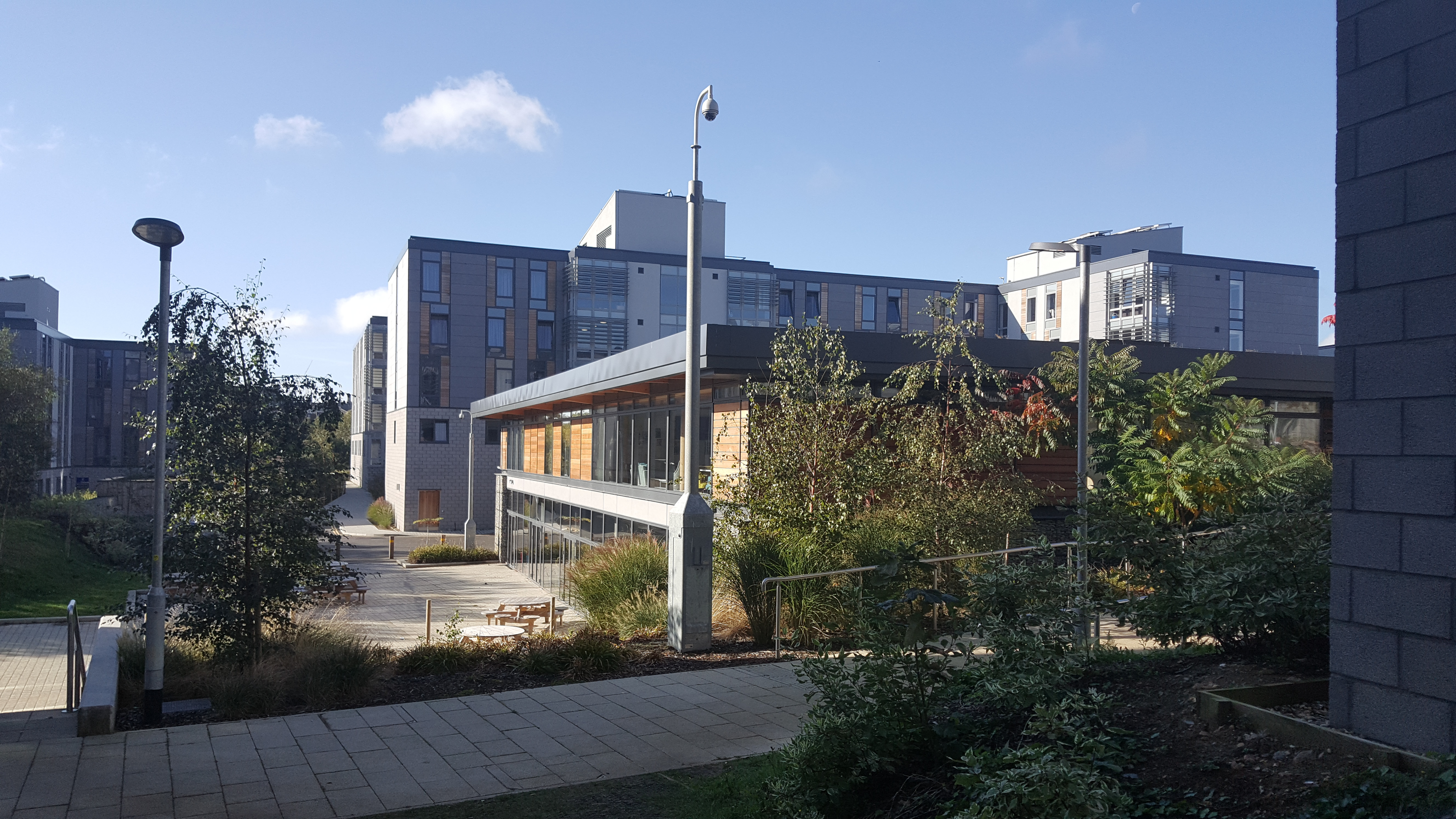
Turing College, a strictly residential college on the Canterbury campus

=== Student housing ===
The university has the following undergraduate student housing on the Canterbury campus:

- Becket Court (meal plan)
- Darwin College (self catered)
- Giles Court (self catered)
- Keynes College (meal plan)
- Keynes Flats (self catered)
- Keynes Houses (self catered)
- KMMS accommodation – dedicated rooms for Kent and Medway Medical School students in Park Wood (self catered)
- Park Wood Flats (self catered)
- Park Wood House (self catered)
- Turing Flats (self catered)
- Turing Houses (self catered)
- Tyler Court (self catered)
- Woolf College (self catered)

Postgraduate rooms are available at Darwin College, Darwin Houses, Keynes College and Woolf College.

Accessible rooms are available in Giles Court, Keynes Flats, Park Wood Flats (Kemsdale Court), Turing Flats, Tyler Court and Woolf College.

=== Student media ===
==== CSR 97.4FM ====
University of Kent and Canterbury Christ Church University, as well as their associated Students' Unions, fund Canterbury's only student and community radio station: CSR 97.4FM. The radio station broadcasts from studios at both universities 24 hours a day, with live broadcasting from 7 am – 12 am. CSR 97.4FM replaced UKC Radio, the original student-run radio station at the university.

==== InQuire ====
The university has a student newspaper named InQuire and an online news website InQuire Media (launched in January 2008). The newspaper is published every month and is made in its entirety by a group of student volunteers. Content is edited by volunteers and is focused on campus issues and news that affects students. Funded by Kent Union, the newspaper is subject to moderation before publication.

==== Kent Television ====
Kent Television (KTV), founded in 2012, is the volunteer-run television studio at the university.

== Notable alumni ==
Alumni of the University of Kent include several academics (particularly at British universities), two recipients of the Nobel Prize in Literature, a recipient of the Victoria Cross and relations of the extended British royal family.

== See also ==
- Armorial of UK universities
- List of universities in the United Kingdom
- Plate glass university
