= Eliot College, Kent =

College of the University of Kent

- University of Kent
- Established: 1965
- Named after: T. S. Eliot
- Website: kent.ac.uk

Eliot College is the oldest college of the University of Kent. It was established in 1965, the same year the university opened.

Prior to the start of the 2020-21 academic year, the post of College Master was abolished at Eliot and all the other University of Kent colleges.

== Namesake ==
The college is named after T. S. Eliot, the poet who died on 4 January 1965, the same day the university was formally established. The name "Caxton College", after William Caxton, was also considered.

== College architecture ==
The basic design of the college was inspired by Louis Kahn's design for a residential block at Bryn Mawr College in Pennsylvania. The need to have three hundred study-bedrooms and several large areas for distinctive use, such as teaching, a common room and a dining hall plus kitchens, led to the adoption of a section design with the college divided into several square blocks, each containing a distinctive interior space with study bedrooms along all four walls. The Bryn Mawr residential block has three squares in a row, but faced with the need for an additional square for each college, it was decided to arrange the squares in a cruciform layout.

The college is to a large extent a mirror of Rutherford College, as the same basic design was used for both and time constraints meant that there was no opportunity for the latter to be adapted to meet problems encountered in the use of the former. However due to the contours of the hill on which the campus is built, the two colleges are not exactly alike and in later years annexe extensions and alterations were to further the differences.

== Becket Court ==
In addition to the college's main accommodation, it also includes the adjacent Becket Court residential building, named after Thomas Becket. ("Becket" was one of several names originally considered for what became Darwin College.) Becket Court was opened in 1990 and contains en suite accommodation.
