= Rutherford College, Kent =

College of the University of Kent

Rutherford College
- University of Kent
- Established: 1966
- Named after: Ernest Rutherford
- Website: www.kent.ac.uk

Rutherford College is the second oldest college of the University of Kent. It is located on the university's Canterbury campus and was established in 1966.

Prior to the start of the 2020-21 academic year, the post of College Master was abolished at all the University of Kent colleges.

== Namesake ==
The college is named after Ernest Rutherford, the physicist and Nobel Prize Laureate in Chemistry. As Rutherford achieved fame in both Physics and Chemistry, it was felt that he was a particularly appropriate namesake given the university's original desire to break down the boundaries between disciplines. Rutherford was also an alumnus of the University of Canterbury in New Zealand.

== College architecture ==
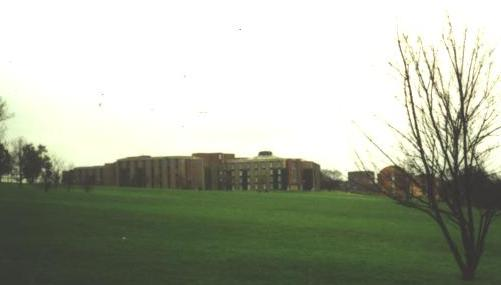
Buildings at Rutherford College

The basic design of the college is to a large extent a mirror of Eliot College, and was inspired by Louis Kahn's design for a residential block at Bryn Mawr College in Pennsylvania. The need to have three hundred study-bedrooms and several large areas for distinctive use, such as teaching, a common room and a dining hall plus kitchens, led to the adoption of a section design with the college divided into several square blocks, each containing a distinctive interior space with study bedrooms along all four walls. The Bryn Mawr residential block has three squares in a row, but faced with the need for an additional square for each college, it was decided to arrange the squares in a cruciform layout.

Due to the need to have the first two colleges built early, Rutherford was designed at the same time as Eliot and so consequently the design could not be adapted to take into account problems encountered with Eliot. Due to the contours of the hill on which the campus is built, the two colleges are not exactly alike and in later years annexe extensions and alterations were to further the differences.

As originally designed, the college was poorly equipped for access by the mobility impaired. Later adaptations have included the installation of a lift and the opening up of some study bedroom corridors, now adapted into office space for academic departments, to provide a level-free route through the college.

== Dining ==
In addition to various vending machines around the college:

- Rutherford Dining Hall – the primary dining location for all of the university's students living in catered accommodation.
- Bag It – a sandwich delicatessen with a touchscreen ordering system situated in Rutherford Dining Hall (introduced 2009) - (closed in 2022).
- Rutherford Bar – a cafe-bar, which served food and coffees during the day and functioned as a regular bar in the evenings (closed 2013).

== Live music ==
Probably the college's finest musical moment was on 11 November 1981 when the largely unknown U2 played the Junior Common Room (JCR). Other bands to played the college in the early eighties included Aswad, The Comsat Angels, New Model Army and Gene Loves Jezabel. In the late 1970s and 1980s the Dining Hall was regularly used twice a term for live events, such as college balls and the 1983 Rag Ball.

== Rutherford Bar ==
Prior to 2006, the bar was simply known as "Rutherford Bar", and was owned and maintained by Kent Hospitality. In the summer term of the 2005/06 academic year, it was rebranded as "The Atom". During the 07/08 autumn term, Kent Union took on ownership. After an extensive refit (beginning in the last week of the autumn term 2007 and continuing over the Christmas break) it was remodelled, the most notable difference being the movement of the bar itself to a more centralised position in the premises.

All pre-existing furniture and lighting in the bar was replaced, and the balcony that overlooked the bar was closed off to make way for solid glass panes that incorporate frosted silhouettes. The renovations that took place cut off direct access to the Junior Common Room (JCR) through the bar, although access can still be gained via one set of double doors and a fire door. The name "Rutherford Bar" was reinstated, and stylised as "RuTHErford BAR", emphasising "The Bar".

Rutherford Bar was closed in 2013 and changed into a study area for students.

The kitchen serves mostly panini sandwiches, pizzas and salads, but is notable for being one of the few restaurants on campus that serves no burgers or fried food, due to a lack of extraction units in the kitchen.
