= Varsity Series =

The Varsity Series may refer to a number of inter-university rivalries. One of these is the contest between the University of Nottingham and Nottingham Trent University – the Varsity Series (Nottingham universities). Others involve similar contests between the University of Bristol and the University of the West of England; between the University of Gloucestershire and the University of Worcester; between the University of Warwick and Coventry University; between Lincoln University and Derby University; and between Keele University and Staffordshire University.
