= Anne Goodenough =

British ecologist, Professor of Applied Ecology

- Scientific career
- Institutions: University of Gloucestershire

Anne Goodenough is an ecologist in the United Kingdom. She is Professor of Applied Ecology at the University of Gloucestershire.

== Education ==
Goodenough did a PhD on nest box choice and breeding success in woodland birds.

== Career and research ==
She became Professor of Applied Ecology at the University of Gloucestershire in 2017 and is also course leader for Applied Ecology, prior to this she was a Senior Lecturer and course leader for Biosciences at the University.

Her research looks broadly at how species interact with the environment and much of her work has been on birds. Goodenough has researched the phenology (timing) of bird migration using data from the Portland Bird Observatory in Dorset. She launched the Starling Survey citizen science project with the Royal Society of Biology, asking for biological records of starling murmurations from the UK public; she found that murmurations are likely to be a protective 'safety in numbers' behaviour against predators. Goodenough has also worked on other species such as in the Flying Ant survey with Adam Hart looking at if there is a single 'Flying Ant Day' or whether it occurs multiple times in a season.

Goodenough also carries out research into higher education teaching methods, she is an advocate of project based learning in particular working with external organisations.

In 2017, she wrote the book Applied Ecology, Monitoring, managing, and conserving, with Adam Hart, published by Oxford University Press,

== Awards and honours ==
- Trustee of Gloucestershire Wildlife Trust
- Finalist in the Biosciences Lecturer of the Year run by the Royal Society of Biology in 2013.
- Awarded Senior Fellowship and named a National Teaching Fellow of the Higher Education Academy in 2013.
- Won the Institute of Environmental Management and Assessment Essay Prize in 2006.
