= Ratnieks =

Ratnieks, feminine: Ratniece is a Latvian-language surname literally meaning "wheelwright". Notable people with the surname include:

- Francis Ratnieks, British entomologist and emeritus professor of apiculture
- Edvards Ratnieks, Latvian lawyer and politician
- Santa Ratniece, Lithuanian composer
