= Scottish Council for Research in Education =

The Scottish Council for Research in Education (SCRE) was set up by the Scottish teachers’ union (The Educational Institute of Scotland, EIS) and the Association of Directors of Education in 1928. At that time, there were no similar organisations anywhere in the world. The Council itself consisted of some 60 members drawn from a wide range of bodies with an interest in education. This Council appointed a director and arranged for some basic funding to come from government local authorities, but the EIS provided free accommodation and secretarial assistance. For more than 20 years, most of the work was carried out by groups of teachers on a voluntary basis.

Throughout these years and on into the 1980s Council staff and associates made distinguished contributions to educational research, often setting world standards. Two key reports were the reports of 1921 and 1947 nationwide assessment of age-11 IQ in Scotland.

The authors of the council's early publications make up a who's who of the greats in this field — Godfrey Thomson, Drever, P.E.Vernon, McClelland and Boyd. These men influenced educational thinking throughout the world. They found worthy successors in later years — Maxwell, Fraser, Clark, Nisbet, Hope, Dockrell, Patricia Broadfoot, Spencer, John Raven, Ian Deary.

In later years the council's research programme came more and more under government control with the Council itself finally being disbanded and the few remaining staff moved to an all-but non-existent renamed Scottish Center for Educational research within the Faculty of Education of Glasgow University. Its website was likewise disbanded. For this reason a complete list of the publications of the council is no longer available.

A short but comprehensive account of the council's work has been contributed by Powell and an earlier, but fuller, account by Morris.

Powell, John L. (2012) The Scottish Council for Research in Education 1928-2003: a Short History, Scottish Educational Review, 44, 59–76. www.scotedreview.org.uk/pdf/348pdf

Morris, J.G. (1994) The Scottish Council for Educational Research 1928-1993. Edinburgh University PhD thesis. (Copy available from National Library for Scotland.)

Some indication of the scope of the council's more recent work may be derived from the list below. Although several are not Council publications they indicate the nature of some of the work ... and refer to subsequent developments built upon it.

Dockrell, W. B., Broadfoot, P. M. et al. (1977). Pupils in Profile. Edinburgh: Scottish Council for Research in Education.

Dockrell, W.B. & Hamilton, D. (1980). Rethinking Educational Research. London: Hodder & Saughton.

Hamilton, D., Jenkins, D., King, C., MacDonald, B., & Parlett, M. (Eds.). (1977). Beyond the Numbers Game. London: MacMillan Education.

Hope, K. (1984). As Others See Us: Schooling and Social Mobility in Scotland and the United States. New York: Cambridge University Press.

Raven, J., & Stephenson, J. (Eds.). (2001). Competence in the Learning Society. New York: Peter Lang.

Raven, J., & Raven, J. (Eds.). (2008). Uses and Abuses of Intelligence: Studies Advancing Spearman and Raven’s Quest for Non-Arbitrary Metrics. Unionville, New York: Royal Fireworks Press; Edinburgh, Scotland: Competency Motivation Project; Budapest, Hungary: EDGE 2000; Cluj Napoca, Romania: Romanian Psychological Testing Services SRL.

Spencer, E. (1983). Writing Matters Across the Curriculum. Edinburgh: Scottish Council for Research in Education.

A list of some 70 publications by a previous Director, W. Bryan Dockrell, will be found in a link cited on that page.

Publications from the Scottish Mental Surveys

MacPherson, J. S. (1958). Eleven Year Olds Grow Up. London: University of London Press.

Maxwell, J. N. (1961). The Level and Trend of National Intelligence: The Contribution of the Scottish Mental Surveys. London: University of London Press.

Maxwell, J. N. (1969). Sixteen Years On. Edinburgh: Scottish Council for Research in Education.

Hope, K. (1984). As Others See Us: Schooling and Social Mobility in Scotland and the United States. New York: Cambridge University Press.

Deary, I. J., Whalley, L. W., Lemmon, H., Crawford, J. R., & Starr, J. M. (2000). The stability of individual differences in mental ability from childhood to old age: Follow-up of the 1932 Scottish Mental Survey. Intelligence, 28(1), 49–55.
