= Patricia Broadfoot =

British academic

Patricia M. Broadfoot, CBE, FRSA, FAcSS (born 13 July 1949) was vice-chancellor of the University of Gloucestershire from 2006 to 2010. She served as Pro Vice-Chancellor of the University of Bristol from 2002 to 2006.

== Interests ==
Dr Broadfoot's main academic interests are in sociology and educational assessment. Her studies began at the University of Leeds, graduating in 1971 with a Bachelor of Arts in sociology. She spent the following year obtaining a Postgraduate Certificate in Education at the University of London, before beginning her career in education by teaching in Wolmer's Boys High School, Jamaica (1971–73). She returned to the United Kingdom and began her research career with a four-year period as a researcher for the Scottish Council for Research in Education. She pursued a Master of Education at the University of Edinburgh, which she earned in 1977. Her first academic post was as a lecturer (and later a senior lecturer) at Westhill College, Birmingham (1977–81) (now part of Birmingham University).

In 1981, Broadfoot moved to Bristol to take up a lectureship in education. At this point, she did not yet have a PhD, eventually obtaining one from the Open University in 1984. Ten years after joining the university, Broadfoot was appointed to the Professorship of Education in 1991, marking the beginning a series of promotions in university management in 1993, she became Head of the Graduate School of Education and Dean of the Faculty of Social Sciences. These appointments ended in 1997 and 1998 respectively, before, in 2002, she became a Pro-Vice-Chancellor, with particular responsibilities in the teaching and learning aspects of the university.

In the period before becoming a Pro-Vice-Chancellor, Broadfoot earned a (substantive) DSc from the university. During her time in Bristol, she also held visiting positions at Macquarie University, the University of Western Sydney and Queen's University, Belfast. She was also a member of the UK's Economic and Social Research Council and chaired its Research Resources Board. In December 2005, she was appointed vice-chancellor of the University of Gloucestershire, a post she took up on 1 September 2006.

Broadfoot was elected a Fellow of the Royal Society of Arts in 1992. In 1999 she became one of the founding academicians of the UK Academy of Learned Societies for the Social Sciences. In the New Year honours list in 2006, she was appointed a Commander of the Order of the British Empire (CBE), "for services to social science".

== Personal life ==
Broadfoot is married and has three children.

== Bibliography ==
1. Broadfoot, P. (1979). Assessment, Schools and Society (Contemporary Sociology of the School). Methuen Publishing Ltd. ISBN 0-416-71580-X.
2. Richards, C.; Broadfoot, P. (December 1983). Selection, Certification and Control: Social Issues in Educational Assessment. Taylor & Francis. ISBN 0-905273-77-X.
3. Broadfoot, P., ed. (April 1986). Profiles and Records of Achievement: A Review of Issues and Practice. Open University Press. ISBN 0-03-910679-9.
4. Broadfoot, P. (4 September 1987). Introducing Profiling. Nelson Thornes. ISBN 0-333-39788-6.
5. Broadfoot, P.; Murphy, R.; Torrance, H. (January 1991). Changing Educational Assessment: International Perspectives and Trends. Routledge. ISBN 0-415-05293-9.
6. Broadfoot, P. (31 December 1991). Records of Achievement: Report of the National Evaluation of Extension Work in Pilot Schemes. The Stationery Office Books. ISBN 0-11-270740-8.
7. Broadfoot, P.; Nuttal, D.; Dockrell, B.; Gipps, C. (February 1993). Policy Issues in National Assessment (Bera Dialogues 7). Multilingual Matters Limited. ISBN 1-85359-170-X.
8. Broadfoot, P.; Osborn, M.; Gilly, M.; Bucher, A. (December 1993). Perceptions of Teaching: Primary School Teachers in England and France. Cassell. ISBN 0-304-32773-5.
9. Murphy, R.; Broadfoot, P.; Nuttal, D. L. (February 1995). Effective Assessment and the Improvement of Education: A Tribute to Desmond Nuttall. Falmer Press. ISBN 0-7507-0375-X.
10. Broadfoot, P. (April 1996). Education, Assessment and Society: A Sociological Analysis (Assessing Assessment). Open University Press. ISBN 0-335-19602-0.
11. Alexander, R.; Broadfoot, P.; Phillips, D. (1999). Learning from Comparing: New Directives in Comparative Research: Policy, Professionals and Development. Symposium Books. ISBN 1-873927-63-0.
12. Pollard, A.; Triggs, P.; Broadfoot, P.; McNess, E.; Osborn, M. (December 2000). What Pupils Say: Changing Policy and Practice in Primary Education. Continuum International Publishing Group. ISBN 0-8264-5062-8.
13. Osborn, M.; McNess, E.; Broadfoot, P.; Pollard, A.; Triggs, P. (December 2000). What Teachers Do: Changing Policy and Practice in Primary Education. Continuum International Publishing Group. ISBN 0-8264-5073-3.
14. Osborn, M.; Broadfoot, P.; McNess, E.; Ravn, B.; Planel, C.; Triggs, P. (1 October 2003). A World of Difference?. Open University Press. ISBN 978-0-335-21101-2.
