= Meadow Lane =

Football stadium in Nottingham, England

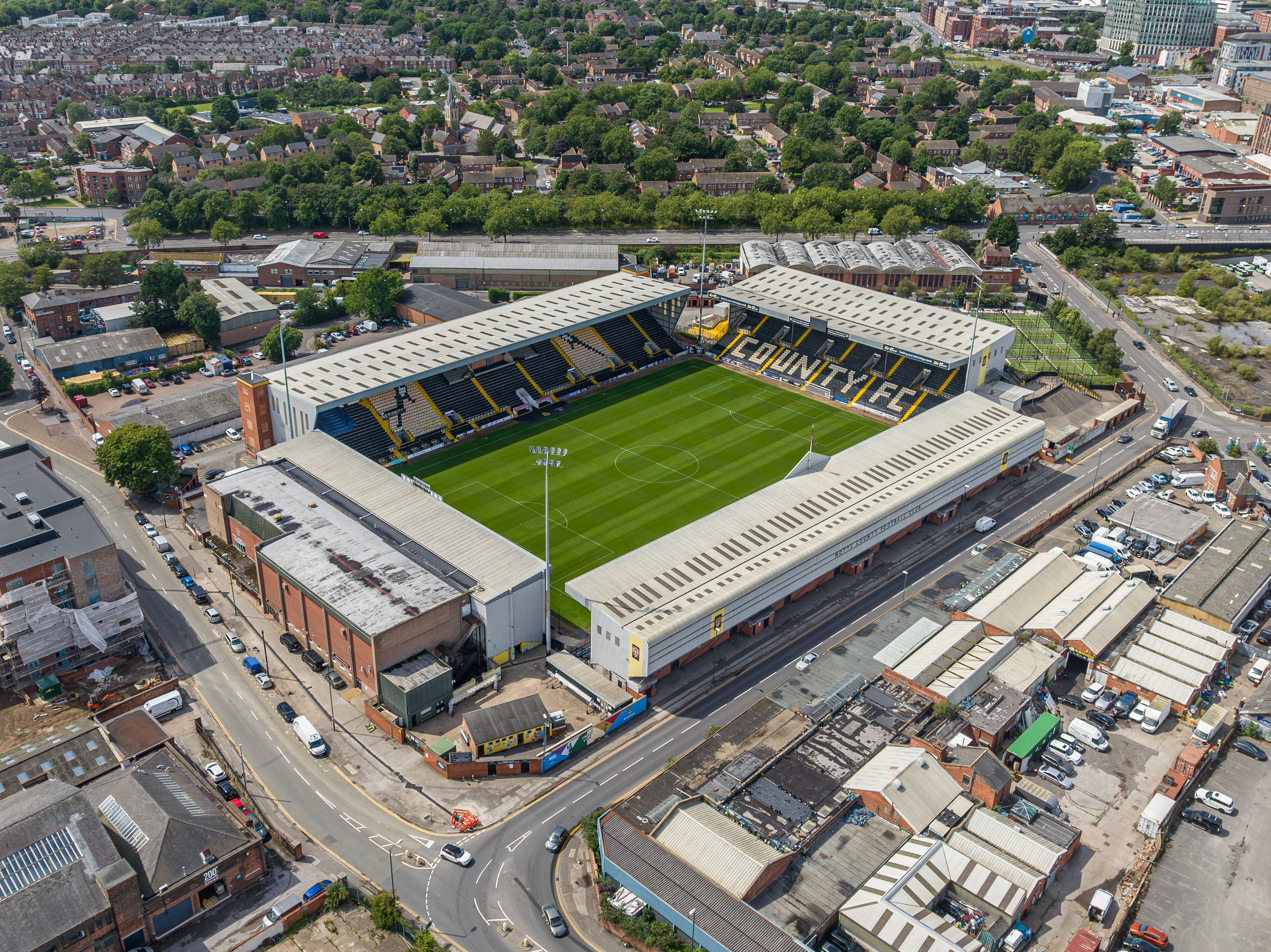
- Interactive map of Meadow Lane
- Full name: Meadow Lane Stadium
- Location: Meadow Lane Nottingham NG2 3HJ
- Coordinates: 52°56′33″N 1°8′14″W
- Capacity: 19,841
- Surface: Grass
- Field size: 114 x 76 yards (105 x 68 metres)

Construction
- Built: 1910
- Opened: 1910

Tenants
- Notts County F.C. (1910–present); Notts County Ladies F.C. (2014–2017); Nottingham R.F.C. (2006–2014) Leicester City W.F.C. (2024)

Meadow Lane is a football stadium in Nottingham, England. It is the home ground of Notts County, who have played there since it opened in 1910. The stadium was also home to Notts County Ladies F.C. from 2014 to 2017.

It currently has an all-seated capacity of 19,841 for EFL games, although its maximum capacity is 20,229. The record attendance is 47,310, who watched Notts lose 1–0 to York City in the FA Cup Sixth Round on 12 March 1955. The highest all-seater attendance is 17,615, for the League Two play-off semi-final against Coventry City on 18 May 2018.

Meadow Lane lies just three hundred yards (270 metres) away from the City Ground, home of Nottingham Forest. Divided by the River Trent, the two grounds are the closest in England and second-closest in the United Kingdom after Dens Park and Tannadice Park in Dundee. The Trent End of the City Ground is visible from parts of the Jimmy Sirrel stand and the Spion Kop.

The stadium also hosts the men's and women's football in the Varsity Series – a sporting series contested by Nottingham Trent University and the University of Nottingham.

== History ==
Before 1910, Notts County played their home games across the River Trent at Trent Bridge as a tenant of Nottinghamshire County Cricket Club. Cricket took priority on the ground and the football club were often forced to play early and late season fixtures at other venues to avoid a clash.

The Football League eventually deemed that this practice was inappropriate and demanded that Notts either seek more favourable terms for the use of Trent Bridge or relocate to a new ground on which they could fulfil all of their fixtures. However, the cricket club trustees decided not to renew County's lease in 1908, giving them 2 years to find an alternative home.

In 1910, a plot of land near the cattle market on the opposite side of the River Trent was leased from the city council and a new stadium hastily erected. Part of the new stadium was a temporary stand from Trent Bridge until a more permanent solution was found.

On 3 September 1910, County moved to Meadow Lane, the first game was a 1–1 draw with old rivals Nottingham Forest, played in front of 27,000 fans paying receipts of £775.

In 1920 the landlord, Nottingham Corporation, which leased the land to the club, came very close to removing the club from its premises to make way for an abattoir.

The stadium remained largely the same until 1923 when the Sneinton Side was replaced with a new stand, named the County Road Stand after the newly constructed road behind it.

Meadow Lane was bombed during World War II forcing the club to suspend all fixtures during the 1942 season. The northern side of the Main Stand was badly damaged and the pitch left in an unplayable condition.

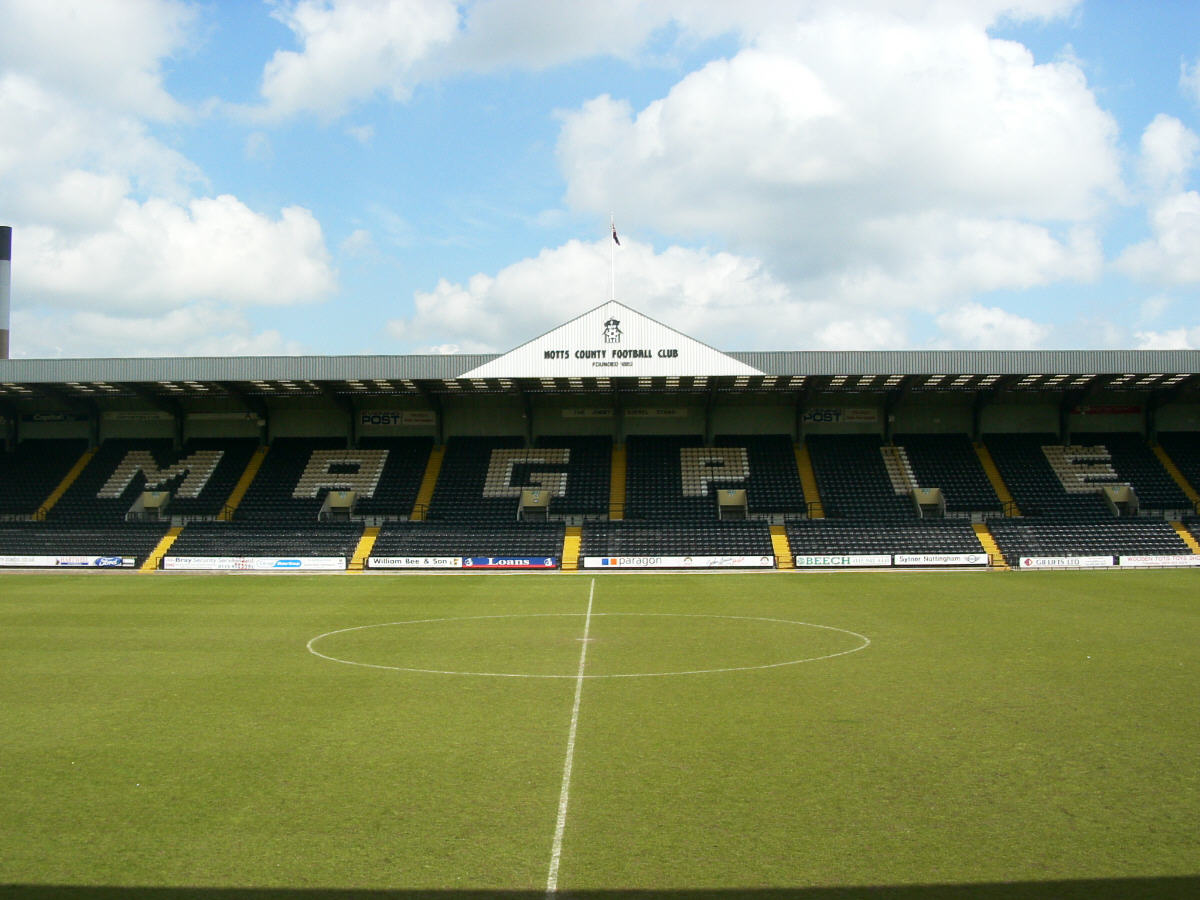
The Jimmy Sirrel Stand

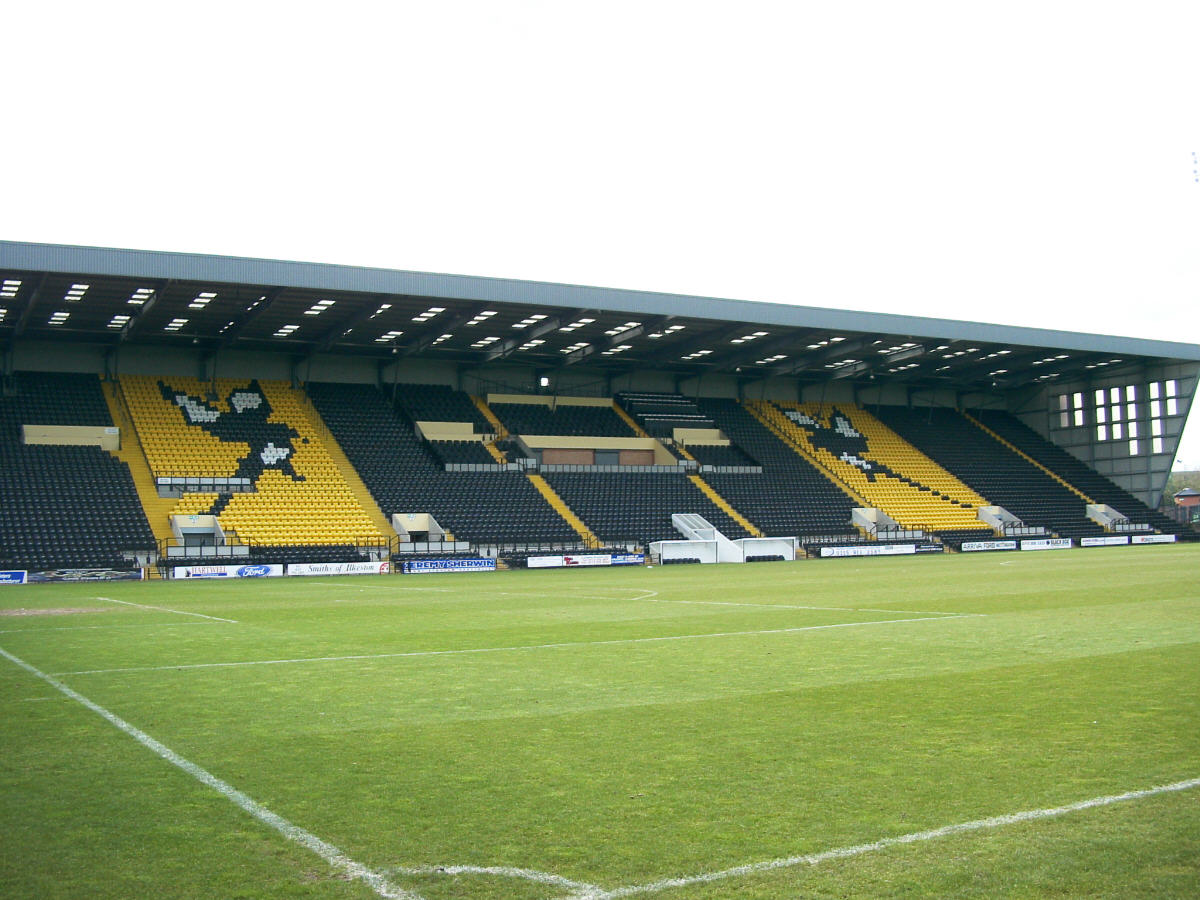
The Derek Pavis Stand

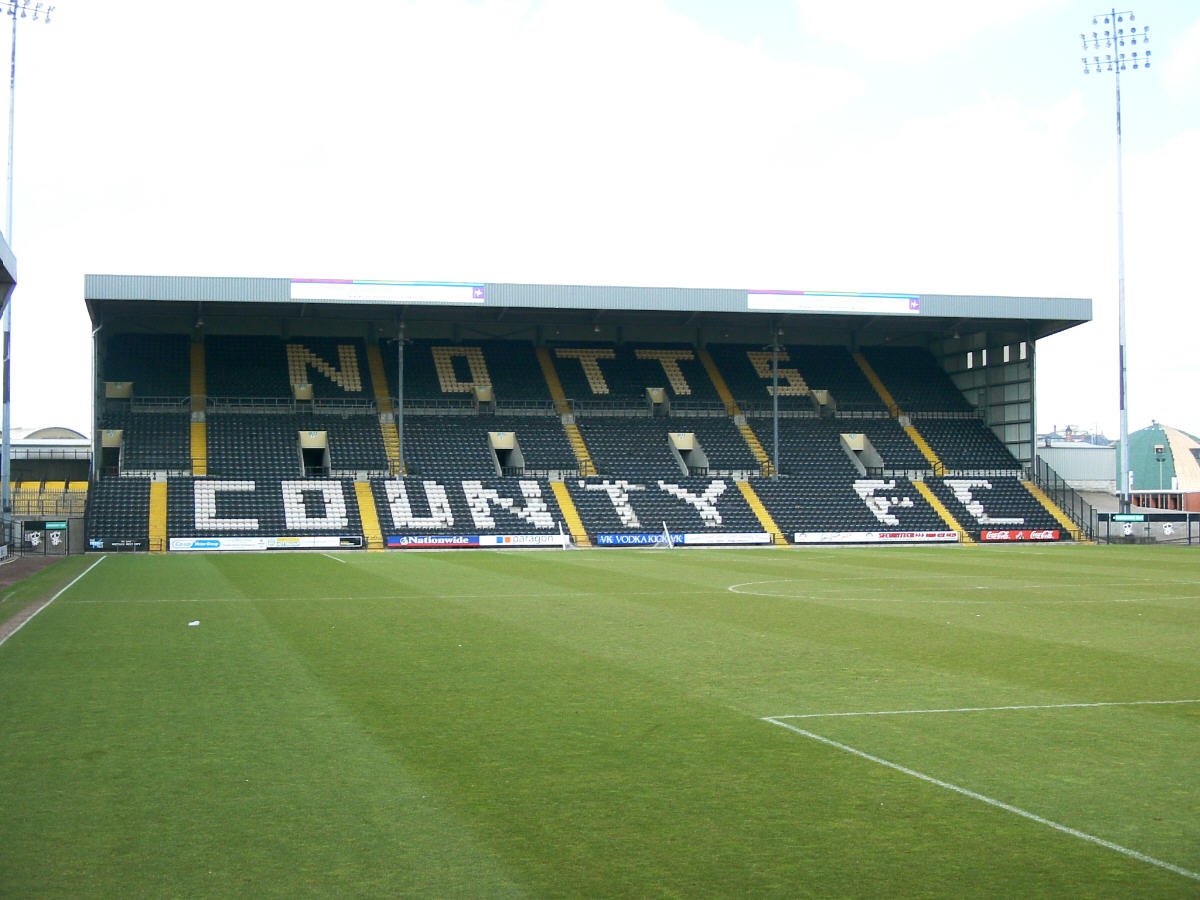
The Artic Cabins Kop

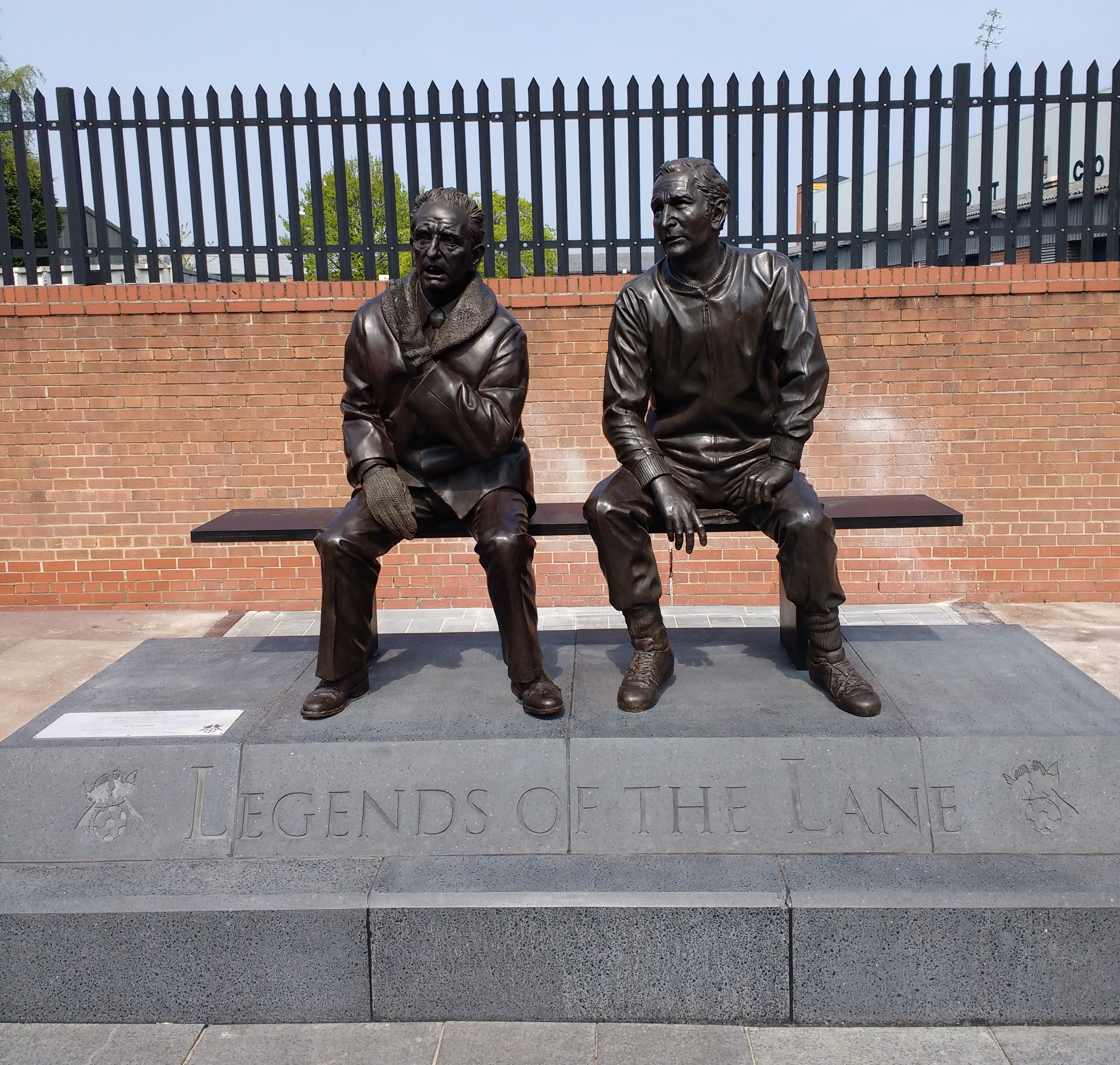
Jimmy Sirrel (1922–2008) and Jack Wheeler (1919–2009) statue at Meadow Lane

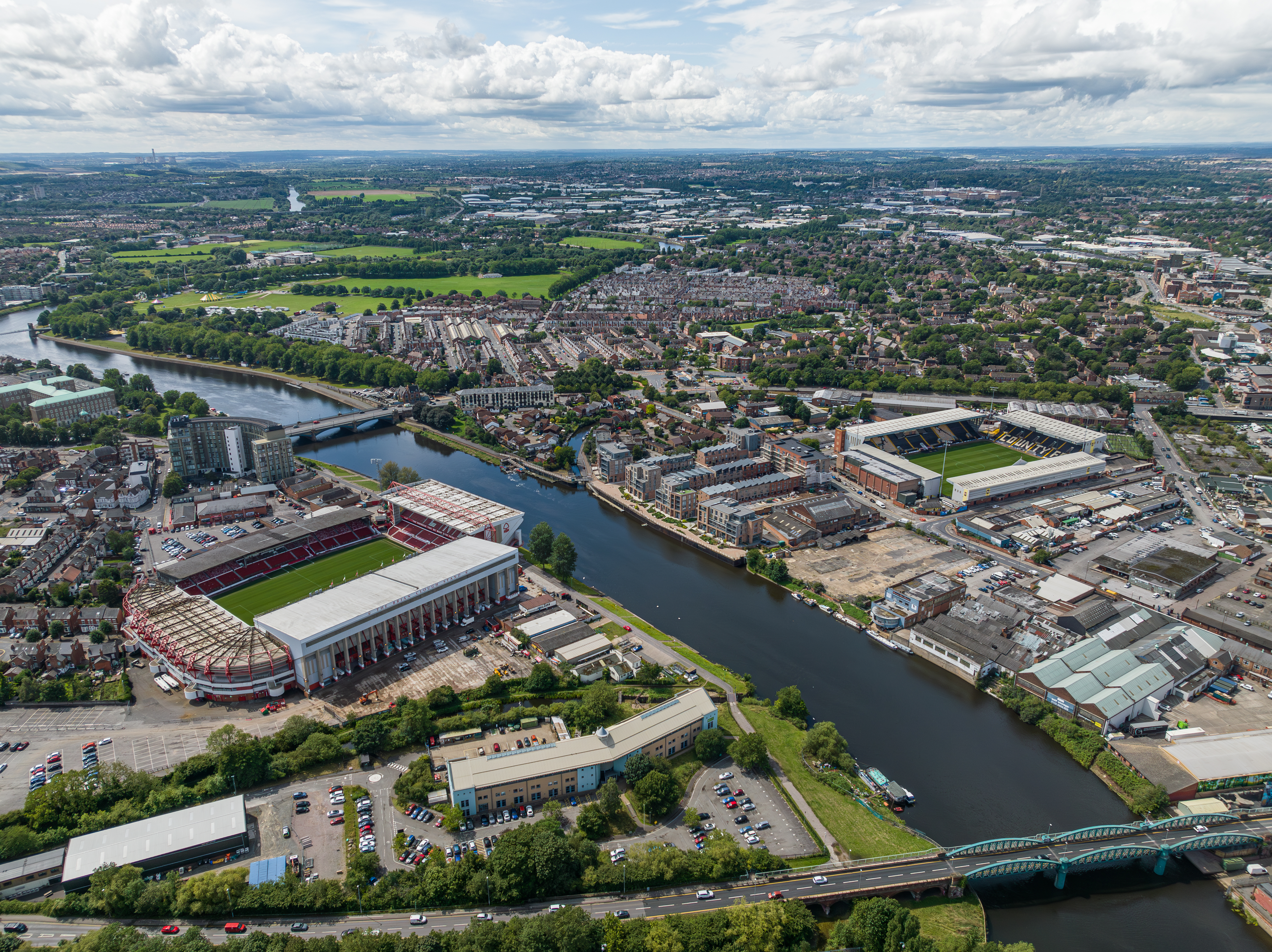
Aerial image showing the proximity of Meadow Lane (right) to the City Ground

The stadium has played host to Forest games on a number of occasions. After the war, when flooding from the River Trent left the City Ground in an unplayable condition and again in 1968 when the Main Stand at the City Ground was destroyed by fire in a game against Leeds United.

In July 2022, new LED floodlights were installed to replace the ones fitted in 2014.

== A new stadium ==
During the 1970s and 80s the stadium became increasingly dilapidated. The Meadow Lane End was demolished in 1978 and replaced by a building which housed new dressing rooms, a social club and a variety of other facilities designed to generate more income. There was no stand at this end for several years and Meadow Lane was reduced to a three sided ground. Eventually a small terrace was installed on this side. The Bradford City stadium fire and Hillsborough disaster brought the safety of football stadia into the public gaze and eventually the Taylor Report required that football clubs modernise their grounds. Meadow Lane was subsequently redeveloped during the early 1990s, although the work was planned before the report was issued. The Meadow Lane End, County Road Stand and Spion Kop were all demolished in the 1992 close season and replaced with the Family Stand, the Jimmy Sirrel Stand and the Spion Kop Stand respectively. The Main Stand was replaced during the close season of 1994 by the Derek Pavis Stand. In 2025 the Kop was renamed the Arctic Cabins Kop.

In June 2002, as part of a sponsorship deal, the ground was briefly renamed the "Aaron Scargill Stadium". However, the ground reverted to its original name when the deal later fell through.

== Meadow Lane today ==
The Derek Pavis Stand contains a number of conference and function facilities to complement The Broken Wheelbarrow bar behind the Family Stand. These host numerous functions throughout the year, ranging from social evenings organised by Notts County's supporter organisations, to wedding receptions and meetings of evangelical Christian churches.

Away supporters are normally restricted to the Jimmy Sirrel stand, at the County Road side. This features a triangular gable (a replica of that on the old County Road stand) with the name of the club and its year of formation. Such gables are also present in the stadia of Sheffield Wednesday, Fulham, and Leyton Orient.

The Family Stand was renamed The Haydn Green Family Stand in 2007, after the man who saved Notts County from liquidation in 2003, by buying the lease on the ground and investing several million pounds. Haydn Green died suddenly in 2007 leaving an estate which still controls the lease on the ground.

Outside the stadium on Meadow Lane is a bronze statue of Jimmy Sirrel and coach Jack Wheeler. Entitled "Legends of the Lane", the statue was sculpted by Andy Edwards and unveiled on 5 May 2016.

=== Pitch ===
During the 2024 closed season the pitch was relaid including new drainage, and pipes for future undersoil heating. The playing surface is a hybrid SIS type.

== Rugby Union ==
In May 2006, it was announced that Nottingham Rugby would play home games at the stadium. In 2014 the rugby club moved out of Meadow Lane to play at The Bay, West Bridgford.

== Stands ==
For the 2017–18 season, the capacity set by the local authority for football is 19,841. The stadium has a total of 20,211 seats.

Stand	Previously	Fans	Section Capacity	Stand Capacity
Derek Pavis Stand	Main Stand	Home	6,330 (Seats) 385 (VIPs/Press)	6,715
Haydn Green Family Stand	Meadow Lane End	Home	2,137 (Seats) 144 (Boxes)	2,281
Jimmy Sirrel Stand	County Road Stand	Home/Away or Away only	2,040 (Home) 3365 (Away)	5,775 (Away only)
Kop	Iremonger Road End	Home	2,024 (Upper Tier) 3,416 (Lower Tier)	5,440
Total	19,841	20,211 seats are available 18,816 (Football)		
