= W. Bryan Dockrell =

W. Bryan Dockrell (1929–2010) was a Scottish education researcher, with degrees from the University of Manchester, Trinity College Dublin, Edinburgh University and the University of Chicago. He made an important contribution to the development of British Educational Research particularly through his time as Director of the Scottish Council for Research in Education (SCRE) from 1971 to 1986. Prior to his time at SCRE Bryan worked in England, Canada and the USA

He was Teaching Fellow at the New York University in 1952–1953, Research Fellow at the University of Chicago in 1953–1954, Teacher at the Middlesex LEA in 1954–1955, an Educational Psychologist at the Manchester LEA in 1955–1958, Assistant and then Associate Professor, Educational Psychology at the University of Alberta in 1958–1967, Professor Applied Psychology, then Professor and Chairman Department of Special Education at the Ontario Institute for Studies in Education, University of Toronto in 1967–1971.

Following his time at SCRE Bryan was a visiting professor at the University of Newcastle in 1986–1994.

Bryan had a range of International activities which included - Pakistan, British Council, Primary Education Project 1979–1984; Brazil 1986; Barbados for the World Bank, secondary education and training project 1988; Sri Lanka, British Council, Post graduate programme in educational management, 1988–1990; UNESCO, Evaluation procedures used to measure the efficiency of Higher Education Systems and Institutions, Consultant on Diagnostic assessment 1988–1990; Jordan, British Council, Examination and reform of assessment project 1997; Nepal, Asia Development Bank/Overseas Development Agency, Consultant on benefit monitoring and evaluation and research 1995–1997. Nepal, UNICEF, Basic and primary education Project, Consultant on assessment 1997- 2000

He published more than 70 books and papers bearing his own name and covering topics ranging from intelligence through the importance of broadening the basis of Assessment to a more-than-illuminating evaluation of sex education in schools. However, much more important than these, was his role in encouraging and facilitating the work of Broadfoot, Dockrell, J, Hamilton, Hope, Parlett, Raven , Spencer, and many others ---- and, by keeping alive work on Scottish Longitudinal Mental Development Survey (which is now approaching its 80th birthday), the work of Deary and his colleagues.

A list of these publications will be found at
