= Francis Ratnieks =

British entomologist

Francis L.W. Ratnieks
- Born: 1953 (age 72–73); Reading
- Occupation: Entomologist
- Years active: 35
- Employer: University of Sussex
- Known for: Honey bee behavioural ecology

Francis L.W. Ratnieks (born 1953) is a British entomologist and emeritus professor of apiculture at the University of Sussex in the United Kingdom. He is known for his research in the field of social insects, particularly in the behavior, ecology, and evolution of honey bees.

== Early life and education ==
Ratnieks was born to a Latvian father and English mother in Reading, and later enrolled in a Biology undergraduate degree at the University of Sussex, but dropped out after a year and spent time on fishing boats, making jewellery and working as a licensed pedlar. After 8 years in Northern Ireland, he was accepted on a BSc course at the University of Ulster in Ecology. Ratnieks subsequently undertook MS and PhD degrees at Cornell University on honey bee biology, supervised by Professor Roger A. Morse and Thomas D. Seeley.

== Career ==
After obtaining MS and PhD degrees, Ratnieks worked with the New York State Apiary Inspection Program and was hired as a postdoctoral researcher at University of California, Berkeley and at Riverside, as well as teaching at Aarhus University, Denmark. In 1995, Ratnieks set up the Laboratory of Apiculture and Social Insects (LASI) at the University of Sheffield as the UK's first and only Professor of Apiculture. Ratnieks then moved LASI to the University of Sussex after being hired by Professor Jonathan Bacon, where much research has been carried out on the honeybee waggle dance and its calibration, the treatment and pathogenicity of honey bee diseases, and the decision making capabilities of ants. Under Ratnieks professorship, LASI has also arranged research abroad in Brazil in collaboration with the University of São Paulo, studying stingless bees and Neotropical ant species.

As a professor he has supervised several well-known entomologists and biologists, including science communicator Adam Hart, evolutionary biologists Kevin Foster and Tom Wenseleers, and entomologists Madeleine Beekman, Christoph Grüter, Tomer Czaczkes, Stephen John Martin, Thibaud Monnin, Nigel Raine, Elva Robinson, Roger Schürch and Margaret Couvillon.
