= Adam Hart =

English scientist, author and broadcaster

Adam Hart FRSB FRES
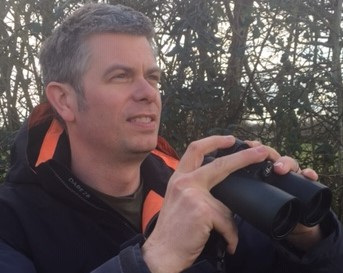
- Adam Hart in 2021
- Born: Adam Hart; Brixham, South Devon, England
- Education: University of Cambridge (MA); University of Sheffield (PhD); University of Gloucestershire (PGCHE)
- Awards: National Teaching Fellowship (2010) RSB Science Communicator of the Year (2010); Green Gown UK HEI Research with Impact Award (2019) British Ecological Society Marsh Book of the Year (2023)
- Scientific career
- Fields: Ecology; Conservation; Social insects Science communication Pedagogy
- Workplaces: University of Gloucestershire
- Thesis: Task partitioning in insect societies (2001)
- Doctoral advisor: Francis Ratnieks
- Website: Official webpage

Adam Hart FRSB FRES is an English scientist, author and broadcaster, specialising in ecology, entomology and conservation, especially in southern Africa. He has co-presented three BBC TV documentaries on social insects (BBC4's Planet Ant: Life Inside the Colony, BBC2's Life on Planet Ant and BBC2's Hive Alive). Hart has written and presented numerous BBC Radio 4 and BBC World Service documentaries and written more than 120 scientific papers.

In 2015, he authored the popular-science book The Life of Poo about our complex relationships with bacteria.

His 2020 book, Unfit for Purpose, detailed mismatches between human evolution and the modern world and was published by Bloomsbury. In 2017, he presented the BBC World Service weekly science programme Science in Action and in 2021 he presented the series Tooth and Claw. A second, and third, series of Tooth and Claw were broadcast in 2022. In 2022, his career was profiled on Radio 4's Life Scientific. The episode was recorded live at the Hay Festival and focussed on his early work on honeybees and leafcutting ants. His third popular science book, focussing on the difficult realities of conservation, The Deadly Balance: Predators and People in a Crowded World was published in 2023. In the same year, he co-authored the academic book Trophy Hunting with Nikolaj Bichel, which won the 2023 Marsh Ecology Book of the Year prize, presented by the British Ecological Society, for "the book that has had the greatest influence on the science of ecology in any two-year period".

== Education ==
Hart was educated at the University of Cambridge, studying Zoology as an undergraduate student of Churchill College, Cambridge. His PhD at the University of Sheffield investigated the co-operative behaviour of social insects, and was supervised by Francis Ratnieks. He became interested in insects because of their social behaviour. He subsequently completed a Postgraduate Certificate in Higher Education (PGCHE) at the University of Gloucestershire.

== Career and research ==
Following a postdoctoral position examining conflict in social systems, he transferred to the University of Gloucestershire in 2005, where he is Professor of Science Communication.

Hart has published scientific papers on a variety of topics, including entomology, ecology, disease, hygiene, nesting phenology, citizen science, Africa antelope surveying, thermal imaging, African grassland management and climate change. In 2018 his research on spiders was named by Made at Uni as one of the UK's 100 best breakthroughs for its significant impact on people's everyday lives. Research Hart co-authored on the use of low-cost thermal imaging for anti-poaching work won the 2019 Green Gown Awards in the Research with Impact category.

He co-authored the Oxford University Press textbook Applied Ecology, described as "a cornerstone publication for all undergraduate students studying ecology", and is a co-author of Introducing Forensic and Criminal Investigation, a textbook. He has served as editor-in-chief of the journal Ecological Entomology and is currently an Associate Editor of that journal. He sits on the editorial board of The Biologist, the magazine of the Royal Society of Biology, and is an Associate Editor of Antenna, the magazine of the Royal Entomological Society. Hart is also the founding co-editor of Instar, a magazine published by the Royal Entomological Society for children.

Hart has an active involvement with large-scale citizen science projects that include the "Flying Ant" survey, the "Spider in da House" survey and app and the "Starling Murmuration" survey with the Royal Society of Biology. The scientific findings of these studies have been widely disseminated. In 2018 he led a team that studied, for the first time, the use of Twitter-mining in ecology, which was covered by a number of news sites.

In 2017, Hart co-ran the Big Wasp Survey with Seirian Sumner, which attracted criticism from quarters in the national press because it asked people to set up lethal wasp traps. Hart and collaborator Seirian Sumner responded to this criticism in press and media. Hart authored a piece for BBC Online News defending wasps and their ecological value as well as putting forward the scientific case for the Big Wasp Survey. Hart later went on to make a BBC Radio 4 documentary and a BBC World Service series exploring some of the issues raised.

As a commentator on science-related stories, Hart has frequently appeared in the national press, often contributing to stories involving invertebrates such as ladybird invasions, spiders and ants. He has also discussed topics including the fear of spiders, the threat of tree diseases, banana disease and insect conservation.

Hart has a strong interest in African conservation and has published papers that include studies of grassland and herbivore management, surveying and has been particularly active in the trophy hunting debate. He has written a number of high-profile articles on related issues, including trophy hunting, rhino poaching and the horn legalization debate, the issues of fences in conservation, misinformation in African conservation, and the economics and conservation issues of breeding of color variant antelopes in South Africa. Hart co-directs the scientific research programme of the Nkombi Volunteer Programme in South Africa and is a trustee of the Wild Planet Trust.

Following the publication of his book Life of Poo, Hart is also a frequent commentator on our relationships with bacteria, including the medical implications of gut bacteria.

Hart believes science communication is about sharing science, saying that "The scientific method is our greatest intellectual achievement – it is a tool to understand ourselves and the universe. How could you not want to share that?"

=== Broadcasting ===
Hart has frequently appeared on and presented TV and radio science documentaries. He co-presented BBC4's Planet Ant: Life Inside the Colony (with George McGavin), a 90-minute documentary about leafcutting ants, and BBC's two-part series Hive Alive (presenting with Martha Kearney and Chris Packham). Hart also presented Life on Planet Ant, aimed at a younger audience, for BBC2. Planet Ant was nominated for Broadcast Digital and Royal Television Society awards.

Hart captained the University of Sheffield team to the final of the BBC2 Christmas University Challenge series, which sees "teams of prominent alumni from 14 universities and university colleges...compete for the glory of their institutions and the honour of being declared Series Champions".

Since 2011, Hart has presented BBC Radio 4 and BBC World Service documentaries on an array of topics including honey, migratory beekeeping, swarm robotics, tree diseases, gut bacteria, de-extinction, trophy hunting (in the wake of the Cecil the Lion story), the concept of free will in biology and animal personality.

In 2016, he presented documentaries for BBC Radio 4 and BBC World Service on human-induced evolutionary change, the controversy over rhino horn trade and on mosquito control.

Hart presented the BBC World Service weekly science magazine programme Science in Action for three months in 2017.

In 2018, Hart wrote and presented the BBC Radio 4 documentary Inside the Killing Jar, exploring the fact that entomologists often have to kill what they study. The programme investigated lethal sampling and the controversial idea that insects may feel pain and was later extended into a series for BBC World Service. In the same year, he wrote and presented the 5-part series The Genius of Accidents for BBC Radio 4, which explored the role of accident and luck in scientific discoveries

In 2019, following the broadcast of Inside the Killing Jar, Hart co-authored a commentary paper on the ethics of insects in research, with a particular emphasis on ecological sampling and by-catch reduction. In 2020, he presented the documentary On the Menu for BBC Radio 4 that explored our difficult relationships with predators, including tigers, lions and wolves. This documentary developed into the series Tooth and Claw on BBC World Service. The first series broadcast in 2021, with a second and third series airing in 2022. Series 4 aired in 2023. Episodes cover the lives of predators and the people that study them.

=== Writing and public speaking ===
Hart is a frequent public speaker, lecturing on topics that include social insects, citizen science and trophy hunting to schools, public audiences and special-interest groups. In 2013 he delivered a 24-hour lecture on social insects as part of the Royal Society's National Biology Week. He has also written numerous articles for newspapers, magazines and for the BBC Science and Environment pages, including opinion pieces on migratory beekeeping, human-induced evolution, animal personality and the realities of modern-day African hunting. He has written about the complex role of gut bacteria in human immunity.

In 2015, his first popular-science book was published. The Life of Poo details our complex relationship with bacteria. He has since gone to write Unfit for Purpose, detailing mismatches between human evolution and the modern world and The Deadly Balance: Predators and People in a Crowded World, focussing on the difficult realities of conservation, and published in 2023. In 2023 he also co-authored the academic book Trophy Hunting with Nikolaj Bichel, which won the 2023 Marsh Ecology Book of the Year prize. The award is presented by the British Ecological Society, for "the book that has had the greatest influence on the science of ecology in any two-year period".

He is a regular presenter and chair at the Cheltenham Science Festival, tackling topics such as tree diseases, bees, gut bacteria, and garden moths. He has also appeared at the Edinburgh, Northern Ireland and Malta Science Festivals, speaking on, amongst other things, the role of gut bacteria and the use of pheromones in communication. He has been a speaker at the New Scientist Live Event held annually in London. In 2013, he hosted the EU COST Science Night in Brussels. He also hosted the 60th anniversary celebrations of the British Society for Immunology at the Royal Society and chaired the debate 'The changing face of medical research'. In June 2022, he was the guest for an episode of The Life Scientific recorded at the Cheltenham Literature Festival.

=== Awards and honours ===
In recognition of his academic work, Hart is a Fellow of the Royal Entomological Society (FRES) and of the Royal Society of Biology. In 2020, Hart was elected a Trustee of the Royal Entomological Society and chairs their Outreach Committee, and in 2022 was made Vice President.

In 2010, he was awarded a National Teaching Fellowship by the Higher Education Academy and the Society of Biology (now the Royal Society of Biology) Science Communicator of the Year award. In 2011, he delivered the Charter Lecture for the Royal Society of Biology and in 2015 he launched the University of Gloucestershire's public lecture series and delivered the AGM address for the Gloucestershire Wildlife Trust. He was co-recipient of the 2023 British Ecological Society's Marsh Ecology Book of the Year prize.

Other awards include:

- 2010: Science Communicator of the Year, Society (now Royal Society) of Biology
- 2010: National Teaching Fellowship, Higher Education Academy
- 2012: Students' union outstanding lecturer award
- 2019: Green Gowns Award for Research with Impact
- Hart is a patron of the charity Bees Abroad
