= Varsity Series (Nottingham) =

Nottingham Universities Charity Varsity Series
- Other names: Charity Varsity Series
- Location: Nottingham
- Teams: Nottingham Trent University and University of Nottingham
- First meeting: 2004 (as the Charity Varsity Series)
- Latest meeting: 2016: Nottingham Trent University 8-13 University of Nottingham
- Next meeting: 2017: January until June
- Broadcasters: Trent TV, NUTS and URN.

Statistics
- All-time series (since 2004 only): Nottingham Trent University 4–8 University of Nottingham (1 tied)
- Largest victory: 2013: University of Nottingham 10–5 Nottingham Trent University; 2016: University of Nottingham 13-8 Nottingham Trent University

The Varsity Series, or the Charity Varsity Series, comprises a number of sports events pitching Nottingham Trent University and the University of Nottingham against each other in a university rivalry. It has been organised for the benefit of charity since 2004. The university that wins the most events is declared winner. One point and half a point are awarded for winning and drawing an event, respectively. The two institutions are based in Nottingham in the United Kingdom and the rivalry is contested in a variety of sports, although ice hockey is seen as the premier event and is the second most attended university ice hockey match outside of North America, selling out the 7,500-seat National Ice Centre since 2009. The winner takes home the Varsity Trophy, which they hold until the conclusion of the following year's series. The University of Nottingham currently leads Nottingham Trent in total series wins by 8-4 since 2004, one series has been drawn, in 2011. The University of Nottingham has won the last 5 series.

== Format ==
The two universities compete against each other in fifteen events across eleven sports. The winner of an event wins a point and both teams earn half a point in the event of a draw. The hosting of the rugby league, netball, basketball and cricket alternates from year to year and the remaining events are held at fixed venues. The table below lists all the events that have been contested in the Varsity Series, the year in which they were first contested and the number of times they have been contested until 2014 inclusive. Penalty shoot-out wins are not counted as draws.

Event	Series	Years	NTU wins	UoN wins	Draws
Basketball, men's	11+	–present	3+	5+	0+
Basketball, women's	11+	–present	3+	5+	0+
Cricket, men's	10+	–present	4+	3+	3+
Football, men's	14+	–present	8+	6+	0+
Football, women's	13+	–present	7+	2+	1+
Hockey, men's	11+	–present	2+	5+	1+
Hockey, women's	11+	–present	2+	6+	0+
Netball, women's	11+	–present	4+	4+	0+
Rugby league, men's	9+	–present	5+	4+	0+
Rugby union, men's	10+	–present	2+	4+	1+
Rugby union, women's	10+	–present	4+	5+	1+
Swimming, mixed	7+	–2006; 2009–present	0+	6+	0+
Ice hockey, men's	10	2005–present	6	4	0
American football, men's	5	2010–present	5	2	0
Lacrosse, men's	3	2012–present	1	2	0
Table tennis	1	2014–present	1	0	0
Total	147+	–present	57+	61+	7+
Series	14+	–present	4+	6+	1+

== Charities ==
Since 2004, ticket sales from the Varsity Series have been used to raise money for charitable organisations. Below is a list of those supported:

- 2004: Children's Centre –- Nottingham City Hospital
- 2005: The Asian Tsunami Appeal
- 2006: The Danielle Beccan Memorial Trust
- 2007: CP Sport
- 2008: Nottinghamshire Royal Society for the Blind
- 2009: Balls to Poverty
- 2010: CRY (Cardiac Risk in the Young)
- 2011: PASIC (Parents Association for Seriously Ill Children)
- 2012: CP Sport
- 2013: Headway
- 2014: DKH Legacy Trust

== Rivalry beyond the Varsity Series ==
=== Academic ===
There is a lively academic rivalry between the universities, with Nottingham Trent University competing with and even overtaking its Russell Group neighbour the University of Nottingham in recent league tables. Nottingham Trent University has its origins in the Nottingham Government School of Design founded in 1843. The University of Nottingham was originally a constituent college of the University of London known as University College Nottingham, before being upgraded to full university status in 1948.

=== Sport ===
In British Universities and Colleges Sport (BUCS) competition, Nottingham University have always finished between fourth and ninth position since 2002–03, whereas Trent have finished between 17th and 43rd. The Varsity Series is not a part of BUCS competition. The University of Nottingham compete in green and gold for the Varsity Series, as they do in BUCS events, and Nottingham Trent University wear pink and blue. ice hockey is not a BUCS sport, so is not bound by the rules that the other sports are. As a consequence, the two universities ice hockey teams, which outside Varsity competition compete as a combined team as the Nottingham Mavericks, wore yellow and blue respectively until 2014, when the BUCS colours were worn.

== Early years ==
It is unclear when the first varsity match was played or whether an organised series was contested in this period.

=== 2001 ===
Nottingham Trent University won the men's football contest on penalties after the match finished one apiece after extra time.

=== 2002 ===
In early March 2002, the University of Nottingham beat Nottingham Trent University 5–1 in the men's football match and 1–0 in the women's.

=== 2003 ===
The University of Nottingham retained the Varsity Football Cup with a 2–0 victory over Nottingham Trent University.

== Charity varsity ==
=== 2004 ===
2004 saw the University of Nottingham victorious in the football for the second consecutive year by a margin of two goals to none. This was the first year that the series was organised for the benefit of charity. The University of Nottingham secured a series victory.

=== 2005 ===
In 2005, Nottingham Trent University won the ice hockey match on penalties and the football match 1–0. This was the first time ice hockey had featured in the series, adding to the football, basketball, hockey, rugby and netball events. Trent won the women's rugby union event. The cricket was abandoned. Trent won the series.

The men's 1st XI hockey match ended 2-2 with Ben Scott scoring a last minute equaliser from and Alastair Wilson pass.

=== 2006 ===
On 6 March 2006, the University of Nottingham secured victory in the football match, winning 2–0 for the third time in four years.

Date	Event	Venue	Result
Thursday 1 March	Men's ice hockey	National Ice Centre	NTU 5–5 UoN (3–0 on penalties)
17:30 Tuesday 6 March	Women's football	Meadow Lane	NTU 3–0 UoN
19:45, Tuesday 6 March	Men's football	Meadow Lane	NTU 0–2 UoN
19:00, Tuesday 13 March	Men's rugby league	Ferryfields	NTU 22–14 UoN
Thursday 15 March	Women's basketball	University of Nottingham Sports Centre	
Thursday 15 March	Men's basketball	University of Nottingham Sports Centre	
17:30, Tuesday 20 March	Women's rugby union	Meadow Lane	NTU beat UoN
19:30, Tuesday 20 March	Men's rugby union	Meadow Lane	
Thursday 22 March	Women's netball	University of Nottingham Sports Centre	
Wednesday 3 May	Women's hockey	Beeston Hockey Club	
Wednesday 3 May	Men's hockey	Beeston Hockey Club	NTU won 4-3 (Scott x 2, Henderson, Wilson)
Saturday 6 May	Swimming	University of Nottingham Swimming Pool	
Sunday 7 May	Men's cricket	Trent Bridge	Match abandoned due to rain
Series			NTU 8.5–4.5 UoN

=== 2007 ===
Date	Event	Venue	Result
Thursday 1 March	Men's ice hockey	National Ice Centre	UoN 3–5 NTU
17:30, Monday 12 March	Women's football	Meadow Lane	UoN 0–2 NTU
19:45, Monday 12 March	Men's football	Meadow Lane	UoN 0–3 NTU
Wednesday 14 March	Women's netball	University of Nottingham Sports Centre	UoN 43–35 NTU
Wednesday 14 March	Women's basketball	University of Nottingham Sports Centre	UoN beat NTU
Wednesday 14 March	Men's basketball	University of Nottingham Sports Centre	UoN 71–59 NTU
Thursday 26 April	Women's hockey	Beeston Hockey Club	UoN 1–2 NTU
Thursday 26 April	Men's hockey	Beeston Hockey Club	UoN 5–2 NTU
17:30, Monday 30 April	Women's rugby union	Meadow Lane	UoN 5–10 NTU
19:45, Monday 30 April	Men's rugby union	Meadow Lane	UoN 29–10 NTU
	Men's rugby league	Ferryfields	UoN 38–8 NTU
11:00, Sunday 27 May	Men's cricket	Trent Bridge	Match abandoned due to rain
Series			UoN 6.5–5.5 NTU

=== 2008 ===
In 2008, Nottingham Trent University emerged victorious, winning seven events, drawing one and losing four.

Date	Event	Venue	Result
19:35, Monday 25 February	Men's ice hockey	National Ice Centre	NTU 2–0 UoN
17:30, Monday 3 March	Women's football	Meadow Lane	NTU 3–0 UoN
19:45, Monday 3 March	Men's football	Meadow Lane	NTU 2–0 UoN
14:00, Wednesday 12 March	Women's netball	Nottingham Trent Sports Centre	NTU 44-22 UoN
16:00, Wednesday 12 March	Women's basketball	Nottingham Trent Sports Centre	NTU 55–42 UoN
18:00, Wednesday 12 March	Men's basketball	Nottingham Trent Sports Centre	NTU 68–70 UoN
17:30, Monday 21 April	Women's rugby union	Meadow Lane	NTU 10–10 UoN
19:45, Monday 21 April	Men's rugby union	Meadow Lane	NTU 3–10 UoN
18:15, Thursday 24 April	Women's hockey	Beeston Hockey Club	NTU 1–2 UoN
20:00, Thursday 24 April	Men's hockey	Beeston Hockey Club	NTU 4–2 UoN
Wednesday 30 April	Men's rugby league		NTU 14–20 UoN
	Men's cricket		NTU beat UoN by 3 runs
Series			NTU 7.5–4.5 UoN

=== 2009 ===
In 2009, the University of Nottingham secured victory, winning seven events, drawing one and losing five. Swimming was included as an event again for the first time since 2006. A sell-out crowd of 7,000 saw the University of Nottingham win their first ice hockey match against Trent in Varsity competition.

Date	Event	Venue	Result
14:00, Wednesday 25 February	Swimming	University of Nottingham Swimming Pool	UoN beat NTU
Sunday 8 March	Men's rugby league	Lady Bay Ground	UoN 10–18 NTU
19:30, Monday 9 March	Men's ice hockey	National Ice Centre	UoN 6–1 NTU
14:00, Wednesday 18 March	Women's netball	University of Nottingham Sports Centre	UoN 26–43 NTU
16:00, Wednesday 18 March	Women's basketball	University of Nottingham Sports Centre	UoN 58–50 NTU
18:00, Wednesday 18 March	Men's basketball	University of Nottingham Sports Centre	UoN 47–61 NTU
17:30, Wednesday 22 April	Women's football	Meadow Lane	UoN 0–0 NTU
19:45, Wednesday 22 April	Men's football	Meadow Lane	UoN 1–2 NTU
17:30, Monday 27 April	Women's rugby union	Meadow Lane	UoN 15–0 NTU
19:45, Monday 27 April	Men's rugby union	Meadow Lane	UoN 13–13 NTU
17:45, Wednesday 29 April	Women's hockey	Beeston Hockey Club	UoN 5–1 NTU
19:30, Wednesday 29 April	Men's hockey	Beeston Hockey Club	UoN 3–3 NTU
Monday 4 May	Men's cricket	Highfields	UoN beat Trent by six wickets
Series			UoN 7.5–5.5 NTU

=== 2010 ===
In 2010, the universities competed in ten disciplines, including American football for the first time. Nottingham Trent University won eight of the fourteen events. Such was the demand for tickets that the University of Nottingham's television station, NUTS, aired the ice hockey match live online. Also, for the first time in recent Varsity history, drawing was eliminated and penalty shoot-outs would determine the outright winner.

Date	Event	Venue	Result
13:00, Sunday 7 February	Men's American football	Harvey Hadden Stadium	NTU 14–6 UoN
18:30, Monday 15 February	Men's ice hockey	National Ice Centre	NTU 6–6 UoN (0–2 on penalties)
15:00, Wednesday 24 February	Swimming	University of Nottingham Swimming Pool	NTU 255–415 UoN
15:00, Sunday 28 February	Men's rugby league	Lady Bay Ground	NTU 16–18 UoN
17:00, Wednesday 10 March	Women's netball	Nottingham Trent Sports Centre	NTU 36–26 UoN
18:00, Thursday 11 March	Women's basketball	Nottingham Trent Sports Centre	NTU 75–58 UoN
20:00, Thursday 11 March	Men's basketball	Nottingham Trent Sports Centre	NTU 59–32 UoN
17:30, Tuesday 16 March	Women's rugby union	Meadow Lane	NTU 5–14 UoN
19:45, Tuesday 16 March	Men's rugby union	Meadow Lane	NTU 18–5 UoN
17:30, Monday 22 March	Women's football	Meadow Lane	NTU 3–1 UoN
19:45, Monday 22 March	Men's football	Meadow Lane	NTU 2–2 UoN (3–4 on penalties)
17:00, Wednesday 26 March	Women's hockey	Beeston Hockey Club	NTU 5–2 UoN
19:00, Wednesday 26 March	Men's hockey	Beeston Hockey Club	NTU 3–4 UoN
Friday 4 June	Men's cricket	Clifton Cricket Ground	NTU beat UoN by 48 runs
Series			NTU 8–6 UoN

=== 2011 ===
In 2011, the universities will compete in the same ten disciplines as 2010. While the American football, ice hockey, rugby union, football, swimming and hockey remain at their fixed venues, the tradition of alternating the host for the other events will continue, so the University of Nottingham will host the rugby league, netball, basketball and cricket. Nottingham Trent University won the opening event – the American football, again hosted on the day of the Super Bowl – by eight points to zero, scoring a single touchdown along with a two-point conversion. Nottingham Trent University then went on to win the ice hockey event in comfortable fashion, never losing the lead which they took early on and eventually winning the match 4–2. The University of Nottingham then halved Nottingham Trent University's series lead after the swimming event, which they are still yet to lose, having won the competition on each of the three occasions it has been staged. The busiest day of the Varsity Series calendar opened with a Nottingham Trent University victory in the women's basketball event, as the series score became an impressive 4–1 in their favour. The University of Nottingham, however, had the better of the day, as they struck back with narrow victories in the women's netball and men's basketball matches. The University of Nottingham then took a narrow series lead by winning its third and fourth consecutive events in the women's and men's hockey games; the former a tight 1–0 victory and the latter a 3–3 draw eventually decided on penalties. Nottingham Trent University were then able to level the scores after the Easter break when they won the women's football match on penalties after a late UoN equaliser had made the match 1–1 and taken it to spot-kicks, but UoN re-took the series lead with a 2–1 extra-time win in the men's match. The same pattern followed in the rugby union later that week – Nottingham Trent University prevailing in the women's event but losing out in the men's – as the Nottingham Trent University girls thrashed the University of Nottingham girls by 27 points before the University of Nottingham men managed a hard-fought 18–7 win. A month break to proceedings followed with the University of Nottingham's one-match series lead still intact and just one event remaining, the cricket, Nottingham Trent University needed to win to level the series, which they did and therefore retained the trophy.

Date	Event	Venue	Result
13:00, Sunday 6 February	Men's American football	Harvey Hadden Stadium	UoN 0–8 NTU
19:45, Monday 21 February	Men's ice hockey	National Ice Centre	UoN 2–4 NTU
13:00, Wednesday 2 March	Swimming	University of Nottingham Swimming Pool	UoN 379–225 NTU
14:00, Sunday 5 March	Men's rugby league	Highfields Sports Ground	UoN 14–24 NTU
15:30, Friday 11 March	Women's basketball	University of Nottingham Sports Centre	UoN 49–54 NTU
17:00, Friday 11 March	Women's netball	University of Nottingham Sports Centre	UoN 41–40 NTU
18:30, Friday 11 March	Men's basketball	University of Nottingham Sports Centre	UoN 73–63 NTU
15:30, Friday 18 March	Women's hockey	Beeston Hockey Club	UoN 1–0 NTU
17:30, Friday 18 March	Men's hockey	Beeston Hockey Club	UoN 3–3 NTU (4–3 on penalties)
17:15, Monday 9 May	Women's football	Meadow Lane	UoN 1–1 NTU (1–3 on penalties)
20:00, Monday 9 May	Men's football	Meadow Lane	UoN 2–1 NTU (a.e.t.)
17:30, Thursday 12 May	Women's rugby union	Meadow Lane	UoN 5–32 NTU
20:00, Thursday 12 May	Men's rugby union	Meadow Lane	UoN 18–7 NTU
11:00, Monday 6 June	Men's cricket	Clifton Cricket Ground	NTU beat UoN by 7 wickets
Series			UoN 7–7 NTU

=== 2012 ===
For Varsity 2012, Nottingham Trent University hosted the traditional 'swing events' (basketball and netball) and an eleventh sport was introduced: field lacrosse. American football was scheduled to open the series on 5 February, but the game was postponed due to the snowy weather. As a result, it was rugby league which was first to take centre stage on 18 February. Trent University sprung into a 12–0 lead with three early tries, but the University of Nottingham reduced the arrears with a converted try before half-time. With the scores level at 18–18 and extra time looming, Will Meddings scored the winning try, to give University of Nottingham a four-point win in the series opener.

Broadcast live online, in a joint venture between NUTS and Trent TV, was the Series' premier event: the ice hockey at the sold-out Capital FM Arena. The first two periods were close-run affairs, Trent University's early two-goal advantage being cancelled out by the end of the first period to leave the score at 2–2 and Trent University levelling before the second intermission to make it 3 apiece. The University of Nottingham's early third period lead was against the run of play and 4 Trent University goals without reply sealed the victory and series leveller, before a late consolation goal made it 7–5.
The following week, the universities clashed in the swimming event and while the University of Nottingham once again came out on top, Trent University did nonetheless avoid a whitewash unlike the previous year, winning 3 of the 25 races, but losing 313–182 on points. On 2 March, the universities met at the Harvey Hadden stadium for the American football event which had been postponed due to adverse weather conditions. Trent University's "Renegades" had the better of the University of Nottingham's "Outlaws" throughout the game and ultimately won the game convincingly, by 21 points to 4.

Two weeks later, on 16 March, was Field Hockey Day and the spoils were shared. First the University of Nottingham girls' team emphatically overcame their opponents by 4 goals to 1. Later, the Trent men's team edged victory on penalty flicks after the game ended two apiece to leave the series level at 3–3. Super Varsity Wednesday in the following week turned out in favour of University, who won the lacrosse, netball and women's basketball events; Trent won the men's basketball (although University fielded their second team due to BUCS commitments). This gave Uni a lead in the series of 4-6.

This meant a 2-point lead for University with 5 events remaining and this became a 3-point lead when the women's rugby teams met at Meadow Lane and Trent lost out 20 points to 44. The men's rugby was won 17–15 by Trent, bringing the Varsity score to 5-7 to Uni. The Varsity Football matches were held in honour of Ariel Olsen, a NUWFC player who had died of meningitis during the Easter holidays. Each match held a 1-minute applause prior to kick-off as a mark of respect. University won the women's game 1–0, resulting in the University of Nottingham becoming the 2012 Varsity champions. The men's result ended 1–1, with Trent winning 3–1 after extra time.

The final event, cricket, was again held at Nottingham Trent's Clifton Campus, and was played in the Twenty20 format. Rain disrupted play, but Trent were able to complete their innings at 130–6. Uni managed to complete 10 overs before rain caused the end of play. As play was abandoned with University having scored 69–2, they were victorious thanks to the Duckworth–Lewis method. The final Varsity score was 6–9 to Uni.

Date	Event	Venue	Result
18:00, Saturday 18 February	Men's rugby league	Harvey Hadden Stadium	NTU 18–22 UoN
18:30, Monday 20 February	Men's ice hockey	National Ice Centre	NTU 7-5 UoN
13:00, Wednesday 29 February	Swimming	University of Nottingham Swimming Pool	NTU 182–313 UoN
13:00, Friday 2 March	Men's American football	Harvey Hadden Stadium	NTU 21–4 UoN
15:30, Friday 16 March	Women's hockey	Beeston Hockey Club	NTU 1–4 UoN
17:30, Friday 16 March	Men's hockey	Beeston Hockey Club	NTU 2–2 UoN (5–4 on penalties)
14:00, Wednesday 21 March	Men's lacrosse	Clifton Campus, Nottingham Trent University	NTU 13–14 UoN
14:00, Wednesday 21 March	Women's basketball	Clifton Campus, Nottingham Trent University	NTU 54–61 UoN
16:00, Wednesday 21 March	Men's basketball	Clifton Campus, Nottingham Trent University	NTU 74–58 UoN
18:00, Wednesday 21 March	Women's netball	Clifton Campus, Nottingham Trent University	NTU 46–38 UoN
17:15, Tuesday 15 May	Women's rugby union	Meadow Lane	NTU 20–44 UoN
19:45, Tuesday 15 May	Men's rugby union	Meadow Lane	NTU 17–15 UoN
17:15, Friday 18 May	Women's football	Meadow Lane	NTU 0–1 UoN
19:45, Friday 18 May	Men's football	Meadow Lane	NTU 3–1 UoN (a.e.t.)
14:00, Wednesday 6 June	Men's cricket	Clifton Cricket Ground	UoN beat NTU by 7 runs (D/L method)
Series			NTU 6–9 UoN

=== 2013 ===
Varsity 2013 saw the University of Nottingham host the 'swing events' (lacrosse and netball.) After the visible change in crowd size witnessed in 2012, American football opened the Varsity Series on the Friday night prior to Super Bowl Sunday (opposed to the traditional Sunday afternoon.) Nottingham Trent won the opener with a dominant 24-0 victory.

Basketball was moved from 'Super Varsity Wednesday' to the Capital FM Arena. In front of a 2016-sized crowd, Uni won both women's and men's matches to lead the series 2-1. Although Uni looked set to win the Rugby League match, Trent held on and delivered a stunning comeback to win the match 8-14 and tie the series 2-2. In front of a 7,000 capacity crowd, Uni took an early 3-0 lead in the ice hockey. Trent gained one goal back in the first play, before two quick goals in the final play looked to take the match to extra time. However, a last minute Uni winner ensured that Uni led the series 3-2 with a 4-3 win.

The Varsity Swimming was brought forward due to the Uni team competing in BUCS finals on the pre-arranged date of Super Wednesday. The Uni team continued to outclass Trent, winning the match 138-80. 2 days later, the action moved to Beeston Hockey Club for the Field Hockey matches. Trent scored early in the Women's match, but Uni scored 3 times in the second half to win the match. The men's match was a far tighter affair with Uni again emerging on top, winning the game 6-5. After this success, Uni lead the series 6-2.

Varsity Wednesday included the final matches before the summer, Netball and Lacrosse. The Netball match was a turbulent affair, but the Uni women emerged victorious. With 7 victories, Trent needed to secure the Lacrosse match to remain in contention for the Varsity Championship. Although a close match last year, Uni took the home-field advantage and won the game 16-11. With only 5 matches remaining, Uni retained the Varsity Championship for 2013, also doing so before the Easter break.
After the holidays, and with only pride to play for, Trent gave an impressive performance at Meadow Lane for the football. The women's match ended 1-0 to Trent who just outplayed their opponents. For the men's match, Trent continued their momentum to take the game in the second-half, scoring two goals and resigning Uni to another defeat in consecutive years. A few days later, however, at the rugby union matches, Uni's team found the form absent from the football. The uni women's team showed a clear dominance of the Trent team, beating them by a resounding 34-17. Immediately following, the men's match again carried Uni's momentum as Trent fell apart, costing them needed points. The final score reflected the ill-form of Trent as Uni stormed to victory, 22-3. The series wrapped up with Cricket at Clifton campus. Trent were able to beat Uni by 56 runs and claim one final consolation point. This left the final Varsity score as 10-5 to Uni, making the series victory the largest since 2004 and the first time Uni won the series before the summer term.

Date	Event	Venue	Result
18:30, Friday 1 February	Men's American football	Harvey Hadden Stadium	UoN 0-24 NTU
17:15, Monday 11 February	Women's basketball	Capital FM Arena	UoN 51–47 NTU
20:15, Monday 11 February	Men's basketball	Capital FM Arena	UoN 83–70 NTU
18:30, Friday 15 February	Men's rugby league	Harvey Hadden Stadium	UoN 8–14 NTU
18:30, Monday 18 February	Men's ice hockey	National Ice Centre	UoN 4-3 NTU
14:30, Wednesday 13 March	Swimming	University of Nottingham Swimming Pool	UoN 138-80 NTU
17:30, Friday 15 March	Women's hockey	Beeston Hockey Club	UoN 3-1 NTU
19:30, Friday 15 March	Men's hockey	Beeston Hockey Club	UoN 6-5 NTU
14:30, Wednesday 20 March	Women's netball	University of Nottingham Sports Centre	UoN 54-34 NTU
17:00, Wednesday 20 March	Men's lacrosse	University of Nottingham Sports Centre	UoN 16-11 NTU
17:15, Thursday 9 May	Women's football	Meadow Lane	UoN 0-1 NTU
19:45, Thursday 9 May	Men's football	Meadow Lane	UoN 0-2 NTU
17:15, Monday 13 May	Women's rugby union	Meadow Lane	UoN 34-17 NTU
19:45, Monday 13 May	Men's rugby union	Meadow Lane	UoN 22-3 NTU
13:30, Tuesday 4 June	Men's cricket	Clifton Cricket Ground	NTU won by 56 runs
Series			UoN 10–5 NTU

=== 2014 ===
Varsity 2014 sees Nottingham Trent host the "swing events" (lacrosse and netball). Controversy arose when the University of Nottingham's Men's rugby union team was found to have breached student union rules in 2013. Originally, the ban was to take effect during the 2013 Varsity, but was pushed back to 2014 due to an appeal. As such, the University of Nottingham cannot field a team for the event, and the event is not on the 2014 calendar. In order to keep the final score odd and avoid a tie, table tennis was added to the calendar. Women's rugby union was still part of the series, taking place at Nottingham Trent's Clifton Campus.

To celebrate 10 years in the Charity Varsity Series, ice hockey opened the series on Monday 27 January. Trent led 3–0 at the end of the first period, but Uni managed to return 4 unanswered goals over the next two periods, scoring its final goal ten minutes before the final whistle, winning a second consecutive ice hockey match for the first time since 2010. American football was scheduled to take place on Friday 31 January, but was postponed due to safety concerns at the venue. Fortunately, the issue was rectified in time for the next event, rugby league. With a BUCS league separating them, Trent stormed to a comfortable 40–12 victory.

The rescheduled American football took place at Clifton Campus, nearly a month after the original date set. Uni showed dominance in defence for the first half, scoring a touchdown for the first time in their Varsity history. Despite this, Trent prevailed, winning 26-13 to score a fifth successive American football win. Both universities returned to the Capital FM Arena for the basketball matches. In the women's game, Trent lost the tip-off and never recovered as Uni stormed to a 61–20 victory. The men's fixture began as a much closer affair before Uni's impressive momentum shone through, winning comfortably 75–43. At the end of February, Uni led the series 3–2. At the start of March, Uni continued its dominance of the pool in the Swimming Varsity, smashing Trent 143–77 to take a two-point lead. Later in the week Trent drew level, with a clean sweep in the netball and table tennis double header.

Date	Event	Venue	Result
19:45, Monday 27 January	Men's ice hockey	National Ice Centre	NTU 3–4 UoN
18:30, Friday 7 February	Men's rugby league	Harvey Hadden Stadium	NTU 40–12 UoN
18:30, Sunday 23 February	Men's American football	Clifton Campus	NTU 26–13 UoN
17:00, Monday 24 February	Women's basketball	Capital FM Arena	NTU 20–61 UoN
19:00, Monday 24 February	Men's basketball	Capital FM Arena	NTU 43–75 UoN
13:00, Wednesday 12 March	Swimming	University of Nottingham Swimming Pool	NTU 77–143 UoN
17:30, Friday 14 March	Men's table tennis	Clifton Campus	NTU 3–2 UoN
19:45, Friday 14 March	Women's netball	Clifton Campus	NTU 37–29 UoN
13:00, Saturday 22 March	Women's rugby union	Clifton Campus	NTU 17–32 UoN
15:00, Saturday 22 March	Men's lacrosse	Clifton Campus	NTU 14–6 UoN
17:00, Friday 28 March	Women's hockey	Beeston Hockey Club	NTU 0–7 UoN
19:00, Friday 28 March	Men's hockey	Beeston Hockey Club	NTU 1–3 UoN
Monday 12 May	Women's football	Meadow Lane	NTU 2–0 UoN
Monday 12 May	Men's football	Meadow Lane	NTU 3–1 UoN
Sunday 8 June	Men's cricket	Clifton Campus	UoN win by 3 runs
Series			NTU 7–8 UoN

=== 2015 ===
Date	Event	Venue	Result
17:30, Monday 27 April	Women's basketball	Capital FM Arena	UoN 100–36 NTU
20:15, Monday 27 April	Men's basketball	Capital FM Arena	UoN 82–56 NTU
17:00, Tuesday 28 April	Dodgeball	Clifton Campus	UoN 13–1 NTU
17:45, Tuesday 28 April	Men's lacrosse	Clifton Campus	UoN 16–10 NTU
19:20, Tuesday 28 April	Women's futsal	Clifton Campus	UoN 11–2 NTU
20:30, Tuesday 28 April	Men's futsal	Clifton Campus	UoN 5–6 NTU
19:00, Wednesday 29 April	Men's ice hockey	National Ice Centre	UoN 4–3 NTU
18:00, Thursday 30 April	Women's netball	Clifton Campus	UoN 33–44 NTU
Thursday 30 April	Men's volleyball	Clifton Campus	UoN 3–0 NTU
19:30, Thursday 30 April	Women's volleyball	Clifton Campus	UoN 2–3 NTU
17:00, Friday 1 May	Women's football	Meadow Lane	UoN 2–4 NTU
19:30, Friday 1 May	Men's football	Meadow Lane	UoN 1–2 NTU
17:00, Saturday 2 May	Women's rugby union	Lady Bay Sports Ground	UoN 24–12 NTU
19:00, Saturday 2 May	Men's rugby union	Lady Bay Sports Ground	UoN 14–28 NTU
19:00, Sunday 3 May	Men's rugby league	Lady Bay Sports Ground	UoN 20–12 NTU
13:00, Monday 4 May	Men's American football	Lady Bay Sports Ground	UoN 6–14 NTU
13:00, Wednesday 5 May	Women's hockey	Beeston Hockey Club	UoN 1–0 NTU
15:00, Wednesday 5 May	Men's hockey	Beeston Hockey Club	UoN 4–2 NTU
15:00, Wednesday 5 May	Men's table tennis	Jubilee Campus	UoN 1–3 NTU
12:00, Thursday 6 May	Swimming	University of Nottingham Swimming Pool	UoN 142–72 NTU
13:00, Friday 5 June	Men's cricket	Clifton Campus	
Series			UoN 12-8 NTU

== See also ==
- List of British and Irish varsity matches
