= University of Gloucestershire =

Public university in Gloucestershire, England

- Motto: Latin: In animo et veritate
- Motto in English: In Spirit and Truth
- Type: Public
- Established: 1834 – Cheltenham Mechanics' Institute; 2001 – gained University Status has earlier roots in 19th century
- Affiliations: ERASMUS; BCA; Universities UK
- Endowment: £3.4 m (2024)
- Chancellor: Michael Bichard, Baron Bichard
- Vice-Chancellor: Dame Clare Marchant
- Students: 9,347 (2024)
- Location: Cheltenham and Gloucester, England, UK; 51°53′16″N 2°05′20″W
- Campus: Semi-urban
- Website: glos.ac.uk

The University of Gloucestershire is a public university based in Gloucestershire, England. It is located over four campuses; two in Cheltenham and two in Gloucester.

The university is the successor of a large number of merged, name-changed and reformed institutions of further and higher education. Its history spans nearly two centuries. The university was established through two distinct strands of educational provision in Gloucestershire, being that provided by Local Government and that founded by the Anglican Church. The university can trace its earliest history to the Mechanics Institutes of Cheltenham (1834) and Gloucester (1840), and the Cheltenham Training College, which was established in 1847 by the Reverend Francis Close. In 1921, the Cheltenham Training College separated into two schools, St Paul's College of Education and St Mary's College of Education, which eventually merged in 1979. The College of St Paul & St Mary went on to combine with the Gloucestershire College of Arts & Technology in 1990, forming the Cheltenham and Gloucester College of Higher Education. In October 2001, the college was awarded university status.

The university provides over 100 undergraduate courses and around 70 taught post-graduate courses within three academic schools.

A 10-year memorandum of understanding exists between the university, Gloucestershire College and South Gloucestershire and Stroud College to support access to higher education.

== History ==
=== Predecessor colleges and institutes ===
The following are points in the university's history appearing in the timeline.

- 1834 – Cheltenham Mechanics' Institute
- 1840 – Gloucester Mechanics' Institute
- 1847 – Cheltenham Training College (Church Foundation)
- 1852 – Cheltenham School of Art
- 1920 – St Paul's College of Education
- 1920 – St Mary's College of Education
- 1959 – Gloucestershire College of Art
- 1967 – Gloucestershire College of Education (Local Authority College)
- 1979 – College of St Paul and St Mary
- 1980 – Gloucestershire College of Arts and Technology from four other Local Authority colleges
- 1990 – Gloucestershire College of Arts and Technology (HE)
- 1990 – Cheltenham & Gloucester College of Higher Education
- 2001 – University of Gloucestershire

From 1992, Cheltenham & Gloucester College of Higher Education (CGCHE) was permitted to award first and postgraduate degrees, and in 1998 it achieved research degree-awarding powers. In 2001, the University of Gloucestershire was awarded university status.

==== Mechanics' Institutes ====
Mechanics' institutes developed in the United Kingdom over the 19th century. A number became the origins of colleges which later became new universities. The Cheltenham Mechanics Institute is associated with a notable historical incident, when a speaker, George Holyoake, became the last person in England convicted for blasphemy after delivering a public lecture at the institute in April 1842.

==== Anglican Foundation ====
The Anglican Foundation of the University of Gloucestershire evolved from the Christian Foundation of the former colleges of St. Mary and St. Paul, merged as the College of St Paul and St Mary which united with the higher education courses of the Gloucestershire College of Arts & Technology subsequently to create the university. Until September 2011, Foundation Fellows played a significant role in the governance of the university. Following a review of governance by the university in 2010/11, it was agreed that council should be responsible for appointing all its external members. Foundation Fellows are still eligible to apply to council to become external members.

=== 2001–present day ===
In February 2012 Rennie Fritchie was announced as the new chancellor succeeding Lord Carey of Clifton, the former Archbishop of Canterbury. In late 2023, she was then succeeded by Michael Bichard, Baron Bichard, who currently holds the position. The Bishop of Gloucester Rachel Treweek serves as pro-chancellor. As of August 2023, Clare Kelly Marchant (born 1972 or 1973) holds the post of vice-chancellor. Marchant was awarded a damehood for services to higher education in the 2024 King's Birthday Honours.

==== 2009–2011 ====
In 2009–2010 several formerly senior figures in the university resigned. In November 2009, Paul Bowler, the deputy vice-chancellor, resigned shortly after being suspended from his post only seven months after joining the institution. Paul Bowler, a former investment banker who joined Gloucestershire in May 2009, was on a week's leave when he was told not to return to work. On 7 December, a university spokesperson said, "The deputy vice-chancellor Paul Bowler, has resigned. Financial benefits have not been sought by Mr Bowler, who is leaving of his own accord to pursue other interests".

In December 2009 Dr. Sharp, dean and associate pro vice-chancellor, following his resignation, took up a post in the new UK Higher Education International Unit.

The vice-chancellor, Patricia Broadfoot, resigned in March 2010, during conflicting views on the financial health of the institution. The precise circumstances of this resignation and the salary paid to her as recorded in the public accounts have attracted various media attention being the reported highest of all UK vice-chancellors for the year.

In May 2010, the chancellor, Lord Carey, resigned.

In September 2010, Paul Bowler was a witness in an employment tribunal case brought by a member of staff of the university under the 'whistleblowing' legislation – the Public Interest Disclosure Act. The tribunal found for the complainant and outcome was reported in the higher education press.

In March 2011, Paul Hartley resigned.

==== From 2012 onwards ====
Stephen Marston, former vice-chancellor, has committed himself to listening to staff concerns. He states 'new culture' being addressed and reports a new senior management human resources appointment.

Since his appointment the university has been nominated for several awards for student support, including the Times Higher Leadership and Management awards for outstanding student services in 2014 and 2015, and Outstanding Student Support by WhatUni.

In 2015 applications rose by 6%, and the numbers confirming offers of places had increased by 18% when the official UCAS deadline passed.

== Campuses ==
The university has four campuses located in Cheltenham and Gloucester.

=== The Park ===
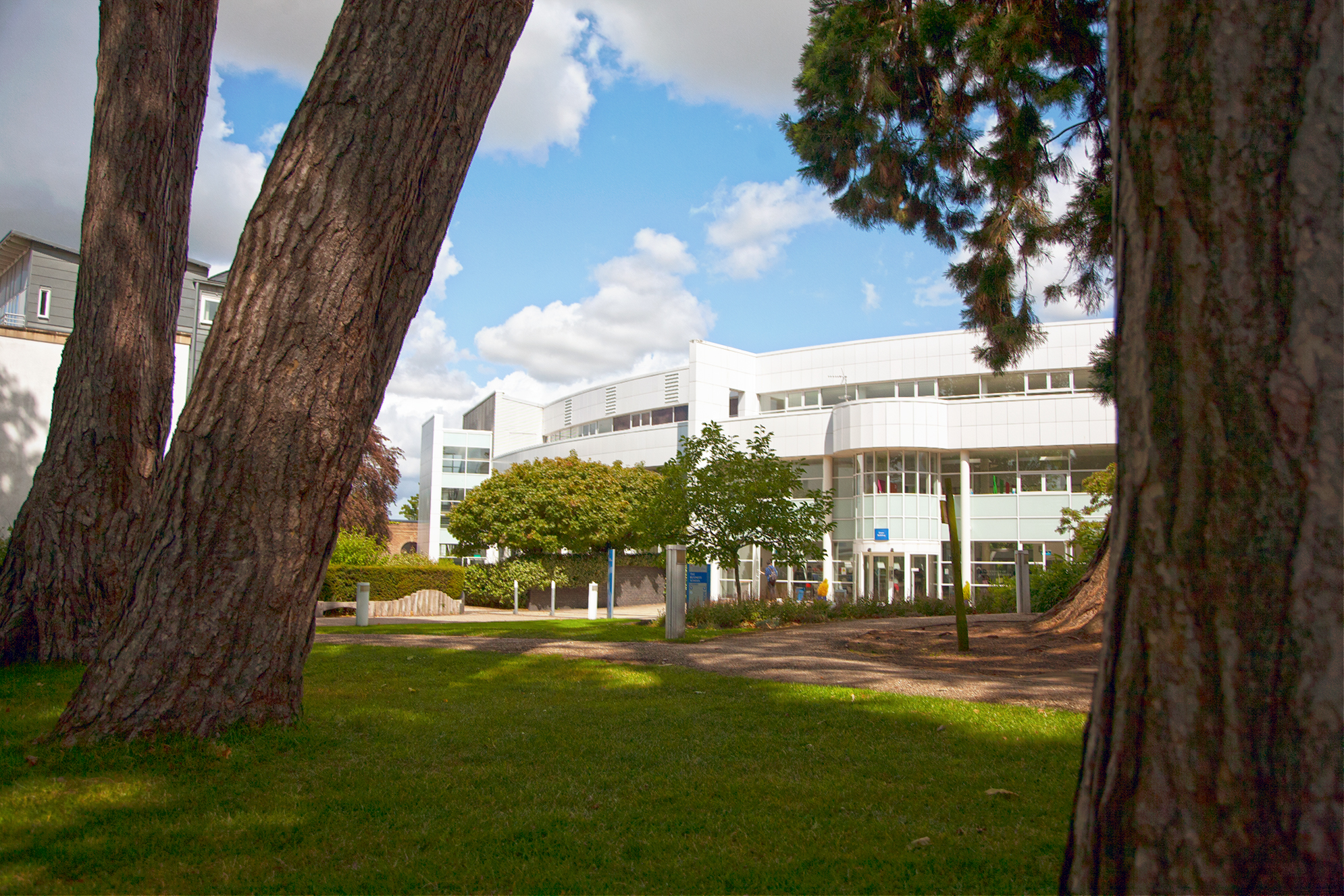
Park Campus – Elwes Reception

The Park, Cheltenham, is the largest of the campuses and is the administrative centre. It is located in the Park district of Cheltenham. The estate dates from the 19th century and was originally designed as zoological, botanical and horticultural gardens.

The Media School was relocated to the Park Campus in 2011 from the former Pittville campus. The new facilities include a newsroom, television & radio studios, edit suites, and teaching facilities. It has been awarded Skillset Media Academy status and is part of the North by Southwest – The Gloucestershire and Wiltshire Skillset Media Academy Partnership.

Student accommodation is available in the Park villas and Challinor located on campus. A partnership with the Gloucestershire Wildlife Trust was launched in May 2009 and the Park Campus grounds became designated as a community green space. The garden includes over 900 trees, both native and ornamental, a shallow lake and a meadow with native species.

=== Francis Close Hall ===
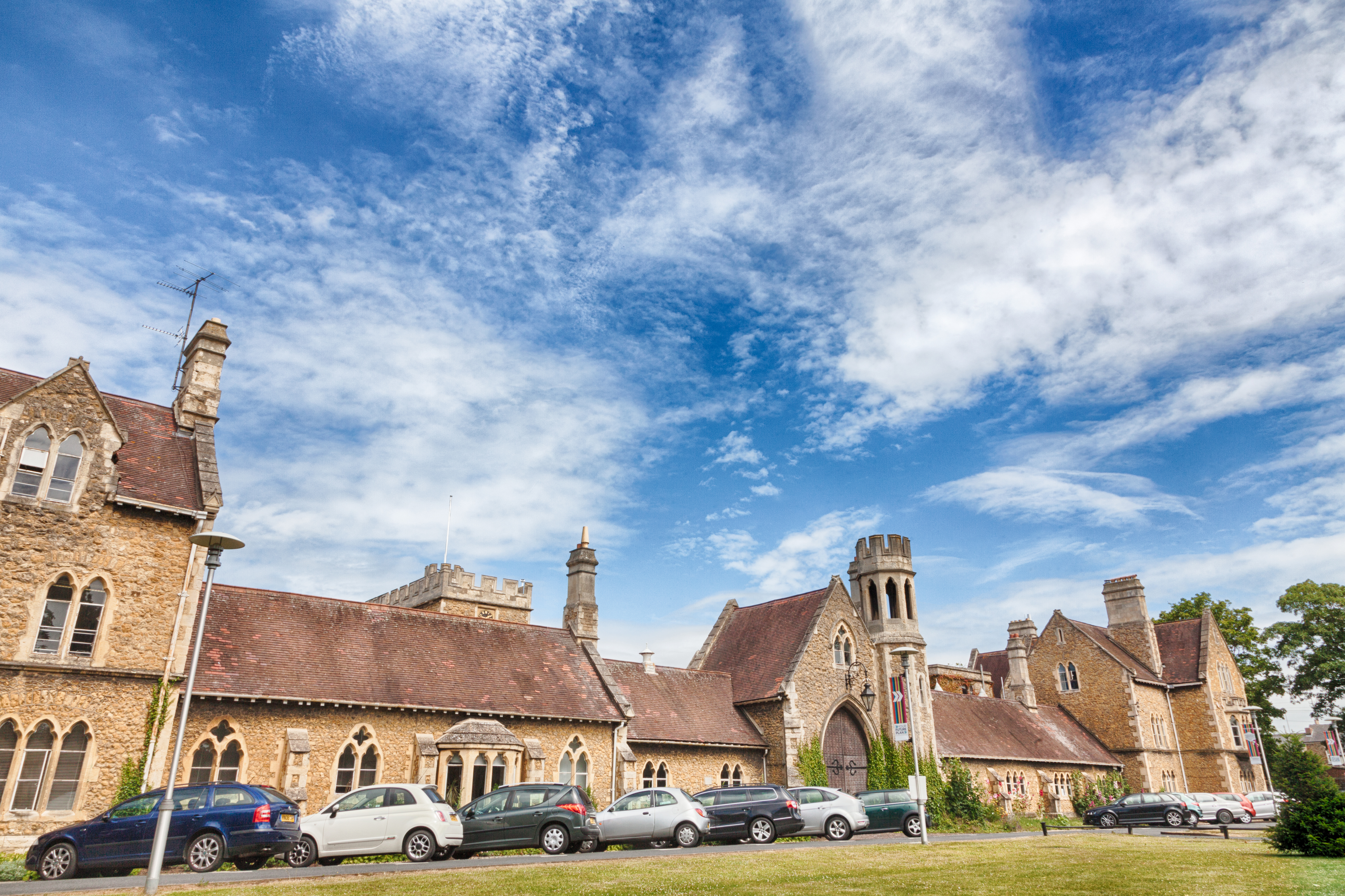
Main Entrance to Francis Close Hall Campus

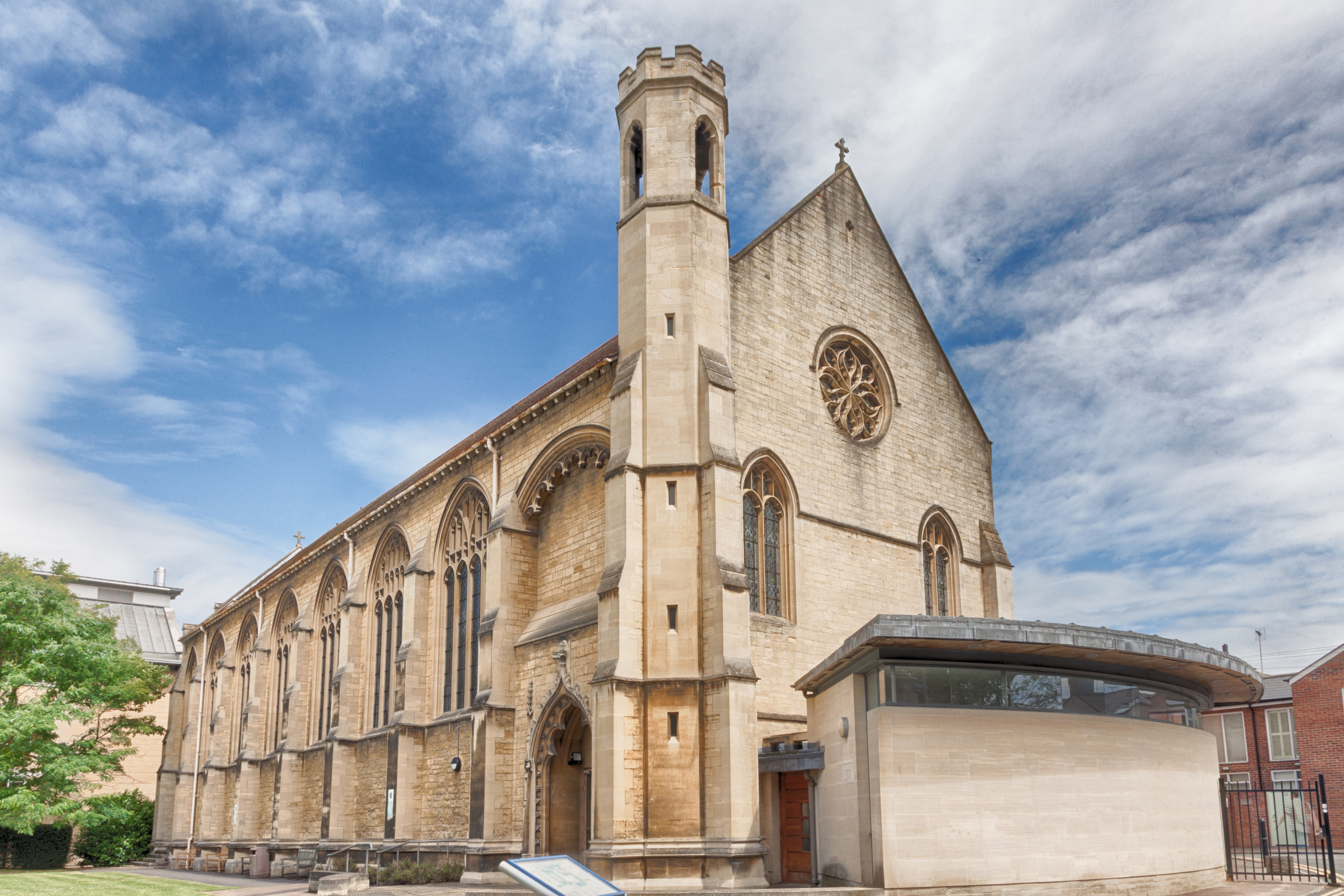
Chapel at Francis Close Hall Campus

Francis Close Hall site includes restored historic buildings close to Cheltenham's town centre. The campus can trace its history back to the Cheltenham Training College founded by the Rev. Francis Close in 1847.

The campus is also home to the university's Special Collections and Archives service, the official repository for the historic records of the university and predecessor institutions. It contains several special collections relating to Gloucestershire and beyond. The department is custodian of the Bristol and Gloucestershire Archaeological Society Library, and curates and maintains the Gloucestershire Poets, Writers and Artists Collection, which includes works and artefacts relating to the Dymock Poets, Whittington Press, U. A. Fanthorpe, Michael Henry, James Elroy Flecker and the Forest of Dean Sculpture Trail. Other collections include the Local Heritage Initiative Archive. The service is open to staff, students and the public.

The campus has a mix of humanities, education, natural & social science and creative arts, the latter housed in open-plan illustration and landscape architecture studios, with VR technology, 3D printers and model making workshops.

Student accommodation is available at the nearby Pittville Student Village.

=== Oxstalls ===
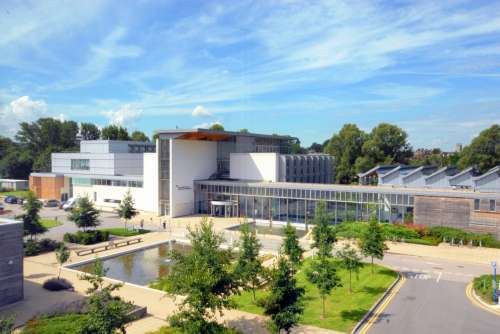
Oxstalls Entrance

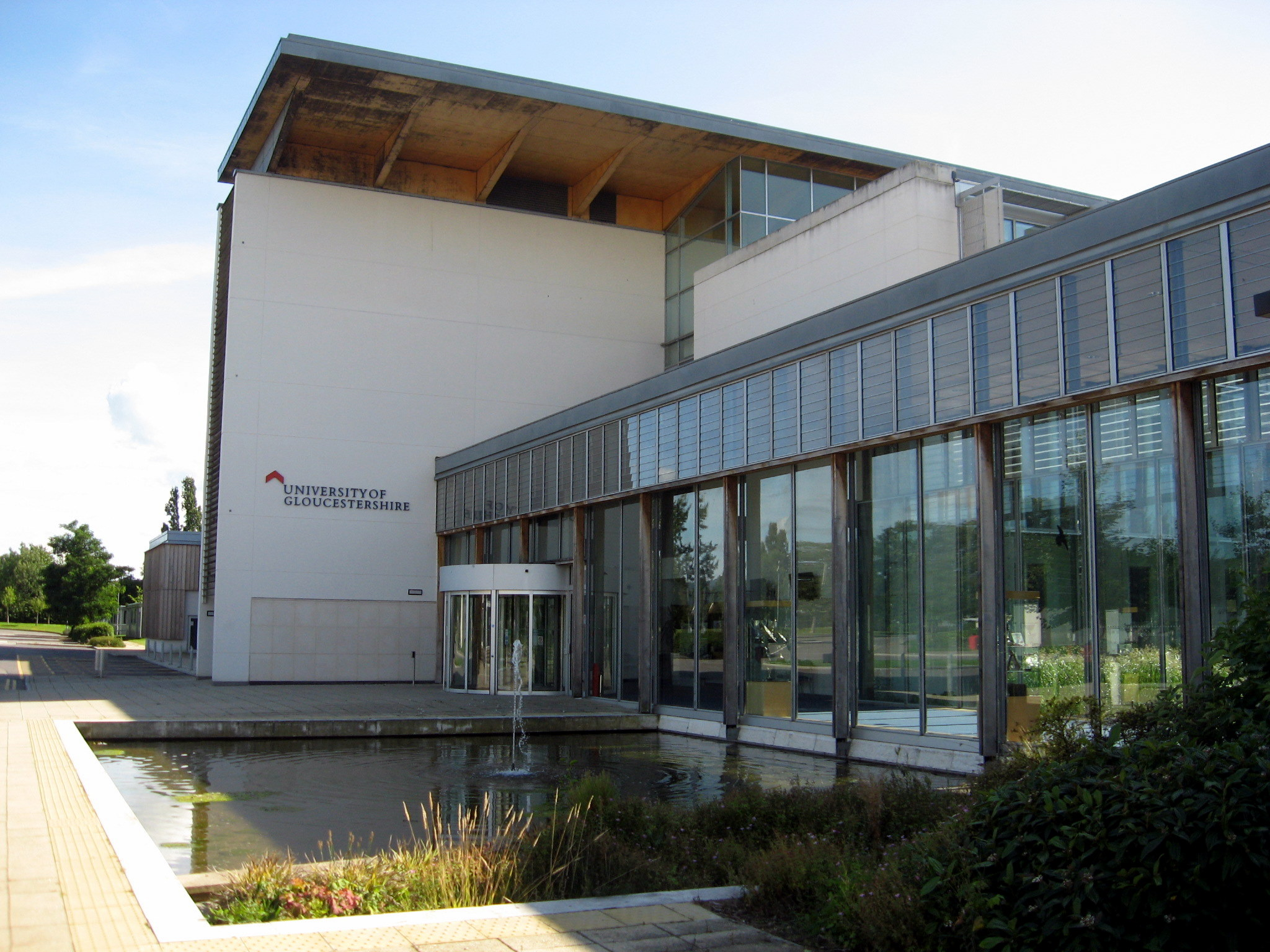
Oxstalls campus

The campus is located in Gloucester and re-opened in 2002. It was closed in August 1993. Following protests about the removal of higher education from the city, a solution was reached with Gloucester City Council. The campus site is from a predecessor college. It was a purpose-built site for the Gloucestershire College of Domestic Science in 1962, called the Gloucestershire Training College, and became renamed as the Gloucestershire College of Education in 1967. The college was closed in 1980 to be part of the merger of four Gloucestershire Colleges in Gloucester and Cheltenham to form Gloucestershire College of Arts and Technology. There is a memorial on the north wall of St Paul's Chapel in Gloucester Cathedral to the college which records its founding within the precincts of the cathedral in 1890 and presents its detailed history.The memorial states that the college cared for the chapel from 1928 until the closure of the college in 1980.

The campus has range of sports facilities including a floodlit all-weather pitch, a fitness suite and laboratory facilities for a range of disciplines, including bio-assessment and a drumming laboratory, which has developed from the Clem Burke Drumming Project exploring the physical and psychological effects of drumming.

Halls of residence were built on site in 2002 and house 175 students divided into 6 blocks (May, Birdlip, Cooper's, Crickley, Robinswood and Chalford). Additional Gloucester-based accommodation includes Blackfriars and Upper Quay in central Gloucester.

A new £1.8 million performing arts centre at Oxstalls including four performance spaces and drama rooms opened in September 2015.

In September 2018, the new Gloucestershire Business School, which was part of a £20 million development opened at Oxstalls. This new building houses the Business, Accounting and Law courses.

=== City Campus ===
City Campus is located in central Gloucester and first opened to students in August 2025, with an official opening by HRH Princess Royal on 16 January 2026. The university purchased the property which was the old Debenhams store in 2021.

At the official opening in January 2026, the Princess Royal toured the campus, including the Gloucestershire Library, lecture theatre, art and wellbeing facilities, immersive room and classrooms.

=== Pittville Student Village ===
The universities' estates strategy outlines a 10-year investment plan to refurbish, upgrade and develop facilities, which includes the Pittville Student Village project. In May 2013 some initial concepts and ideas for the redevelopment were presented. Plans included creating 450 extra bedrooms, to the existing 214 student rooms, plus a small retail unit and sports facilities. Additional public consultation sessions in August and September 2014 presented plans to build additional accommodation to a total of 791 beds against widespread opposition from the local residents. The plans for Pittville Student Village were approved by Cheltenham Borough Council's planning committee on 16 July 2015. The new student village will increase the number of beds to 794 and also includes new office space for several administrative departments as well as sports facilities. Pittville Student Village was officially opened on 5 April 2018 by artist PJ Crook, a Gloucestershire alumna, to mark the campus' history as an art school.

=== Former campuses ===
==== Hardwick ====
Hardwick, which was located in Cheltenham, closed at the end of the academic year 2024/25 due to the opening of the newly converted City Campus in Gloucester. The Campus has been sold and will be redeveloped for housing.

==== Pittville ====
The Pittville site is located on Albert Road, Cheltenham, and was the home of the Faculty of Media, Art and Communications. It was founded as Cheltenham School of Art over 150 years ago The campus closed in 2011 with courses from the Faculty of Media, Arts and Technology located at Hardwick and the Park and has since been reopened as a new student village.

=== Environmental sustainability ===
The university has had an environmental sustainability strategy since 1993, and was the first British university to meet the ISO 14001 environmental management standard. In the People & Planet Green League 2016 it was ranked as the second greenest university in the UK. The university is the only British institution to be consistently ranked in the top six of the league since its inception in 2007. The university is also a regular winner at the EUAC Green Gown Awards, winning the award for Continuous Improvement in 2008 and 2014. RCE Severn is a Regional Centre of Expertise (RCE) in Sustainability Education based at the university. It is endorsed by the United Nations University and one of 85 similar centres throughout the world.

=== The Centre for Fashion, Art and Photography ===
The Hardwick Centre for Fashion, Art and Photography opened in 2011 and is in close proximity to Francis Close Hall. The purpose-built studios cater for students studying a mixture of creative subjects including its Fine Art (undergraduate and postgraduate), Photography and Fashion degrees. There is a gallery for public exhibitions. It has recently been renamed as The Centre for Fashion, Art and Photography. In 2024, it was announced the university was selling the land for redevelopment into housing.

== Organisation and administration ==
University of Gloucestershire's coat of arms

=== Schools ===
The university is organised into three schools of study:

- School of Business, Computing and Social Sciences
- School of Arts, Culture and Environment
- School of Education and Science

=== Administration ===
==== Vice-Chancellors ====
- Dame Janet Trotter was the Vice-chancellor and Principal from 2001, retiring in 2006.
- Patricia Broadfoot, resigned in March 2010.
- Paul Hartley, until July 2011.
- Stephen Marston, from August 2011 until July 2023.
- Clare Marchant, from August 2023 until present.

==== University Council ====
The Council is the university's governing body and is responsible for the educational character and mission of the university, the approval of annual estimates of income and expenditure, the appointment of senior staff, and the Articles of Association that set out the formal governance arrangements of the university. Council currently comprises 18 members; 14 external members and 4 members from the university community, including the vice-chancellor, representatives for both academic and support members of staff, and the president of the Students' Union.

In January 2016, Professor Julian Crampton, former vice-chancellor at the University of Brighton was appointed Chair of Council.

In October 2019, Nicola De Iongh was appointed Chair of Council.

==== University Executive Committee ====
The University Executive Committee is responsible for all matters associated with the development and management of the university. The University Executive Committee currently comprises nine members including the Vice-Chancellor as chair.

=== Partnerships ===
The University of Gloucestershire, Gloucestershire College, South Gloucestershire and Stroud College have formed a Strategic Alliance for higher education in Gloucestershire and the west of England, with the initiative to raise the quality, range and accessibility of higher education in the county through stronger links between further and higher education.

The university delivers programmes with several collaborative partners in the UK and in 5 countries overseas, including Malaysia and Zimbabwe.

The university is also an active participant in the ERASMUS programme and the only UK university to be part of the BCA Programme offering semesters abroad, most notably in the USA.

==== Gloucestershire Enterprise Partnership ====
The university became a partner with the GFirst Local Enterprise Partnership in 2013. The partnership secured over £7 million of funding to support enterprise, business development and business support services.

The Growth Hub became operational from the Oxstalls campus in 2014. Businesses are able to access a diverse range of coordinated and integrated business services.

== Academic profile ==
The university provides over 100 undergraduate courses covering a variety of subjects including Accounting and Law, Business Management, Computing, Journalism, Fine Art, Humanities, Biology, Geography, Social Science, Education and Sports across three academic schools.

As well as providing part-time and full-time options for undergraduate study, the university has a number of courses available as Fast Track two-year full-time programmes.

The university provides around 70 taught post-graduate courses in the areas of: Accounting and Law, Business and Management; Computing, IT and Multimedia; Health and Social Care; Education; Humanities; Leisure; Media, Art and Design; Natural and Social Sciences and Sport and Exercise.

=== Teaching Fellowships ===
A number of members of staff hold National Teaching Fellowships. The NTF scheme is open to staff whose teaching or support roles enhance the student learning experience at institutions in England, Northern Ireland and Wales.

The members of staff currently teaching at the university who are National Teaching Fellows (with the year they were awarded an NTF in brackets) are:

- Dr Andy Pitchford, Director of Sport (2015)
- Dr Anne Goodenough, Professor of Applied Ecology (2013)
- Prof Nigel McLoughlin, Professor of Creativity and Poetics (2011)
- Prof Adam Hart, Professor of Science Communication (2010)
- Prof Arran Stibbe, Professor of Ecological Linguistics (2009)
- James Derounian, Principal Lecturer in Countryside Planning (2007)
- Dr Kenneth Lynch, Reader in Geography (received while at Kingston University in 2004)

=== Notable staff members ===
Adam Hart, Professor of Science Communication and National Teaching Fellow, who co-presented Hive Alive and has made documentaries for BBC Radio 4 and the BBC World Service.

Anne Dawson, Head of School of Creative Industries, TV presenter with BBC and ITV News.

Anita Navin, Head of the School of Sport and Exercise, Sky Sports netball commentator, who covered televised netball for the Commonwealth Games in 2014.

Lindsey Dryden, Lecturer in Film Production, acclaimed British filmmaker who is an Emmy winner, and producer of Sundance Special Jury Award-winning film Unrest.

Tom Bradshaw, Course Leader in Sports Journalism and ports journalist for BBC Sport Online, BBC radio and The Guardian, and The Independent.

Richard Billingham, Professor of Fine Art, renowned photographer, film-maker and artist who has been a Turner prize nominee and winner of the prestigious Deutsche Borse Group photography prize.

Neil Towers, former director of the George Davies Centre for Retail Excellence, is Professor of Retail Marketing, and was appointed in 2014.

Illustration lecturer Fumio Obata is a comic book author, visual artist and animator

Senior lecturer in Criminology Dr Jane Monckton Smith is an author and part of the Home Office College of Policing scrutiny panel for domestic abuse training.

Andy Pitchford is the director of sport at the university. Andy joined the university in 1996 and among his contributions he has supported enterprising students to create an international development programme, Sport Malawi.

Acting Head of Humanities and Religion, Philosophy & Ethics lecturer, David Webster, is an author and blogger. In addition to scholarly works on Buddhism and desire, the nature of belief, and other topics in Buddhist studies and the Philosophy of Religion, David has also written about the blues, and death in religions. Dave was recently named by JISC as one of the '50 Most Influential HE Professionals Using Social Media'.

=== Partnership with Superdry ===
Global brand Superdry collaborates with the university's Fashion degree which sees the brand's design and creative teams provide expert industry advice, guidance and practical experience to fashion students. Superdry are also one of the supporters of the Graphic Design programme.

=== Scholarships and financial support ===
The university charges £9,250 for new entrants in 2021/22 for UK and EU full-time students on undergraduate degree courses. Foundation degrees are £7,500. Fees for International Students outside the EU on undergraduate programmes are £11,750 per year.

The University of Gloucestershire offers a range of financial support packages for undergraduate students commencing their studies in as follows:

- Care Leavers Scholarship
- Music scholarship
- Partnership Bursary
- Financial Assistance Fund
- Sports Excellence Funds
- Emergency short-term loans
- PGCE bursaries

Additionally the university offers unique sports refereeing scholarships supported by the Rugby Football Union, the Football Association, England Netball and the English Cricket Board.

=== Awards and rankings ===
Rankings
National rankings
- Complete (2027): 72=
- Guardian (2027): 73
- Times / Sunday Times (2027): 104=

Global rankings
- THE (2026): 1001–1200

- The university has a silver rating in the government's Teaching Excellence Framework, which rates participating universities as Gold, Silver or Bronze.
- The University of Gloucestershire was equal 55th out of 121 universities in The Guardian University Guide 2019.
- The university's overall satisfaction score is 3% higher than the average at 86% ranking them in joint 36th place out of 156 universities and HE colleges in the UK (National Student Survey, 2018).
- The university was ranked second in the People and Planet green league in 2017.
- The university has been training teachers since 1847 and is 'outstanding' in primary and secondary school training as rated by Ofsted in 2015.

== Research ==
Research at the university has been rated as World-Leading in five of its research areas. More than half of the work in seven out of the university's 12 submissions to the RAE was additionally recognised as of international quality, while all academic areas were judged to be of a quality that is recognised nationally.

The university invests 12% of academic staff costs in research and scholarly activity. Its strategy states that all academic staff engage in 'research and scholarly activity' to the benefit of teaching and learning and allocated research time is used for a 'range of scholarship and research related activity, which may lead to publication, income generation, knowledge transfer, or practice-based outcomes...'

The university pursues and supports four types of research activity:

- Postgraduate research being the supervision and training of postgraduate research students. This is funded via course fees and the Quality Related (QR) grant (Research Degree Programme funds);
- Research and Scholarship being activity to support subject knowledge and pedagogy, professional practice, and the development of research-informed teaching. This is funded via (a) the Teaching grant, 185 hours research and scholarly activity time per person provided through the staff Academic Contract, (b) any additional time to be funded from Faculty investment against priorities identified in Business Plans;
- Income generating research being commissioned or user-defined work for external agencies. This is funded via the Funding Agency and quantified/costed through the Project Implementation Management System (PIMS);
- REF preparation (Research Excellence Framework assessment exercise) being research towards internationally excellent (3*) submissible outputs / impact. This is funded via the HEFCE QR grant.

== Student life ==
=== Students' Union ===
The University of Gloucestershire's Students' Union has three full-time officers. The officers are voted for by students. The Students' Union provides a number of opportunities for students including volunteering and part-time work. The Students' Union runs an annual summer ball.

The Students' Union supports the running of over 30 sports teams' societies ranging from Rugby, Netball and Hockey to Equestrian, Trampoline and Kendo. Societies include Beekeeping, RAG (Raising and Giving) and subject-based societies. The University of Gloucestershire competes in a sports varsity tournament every year playing against the University of Worcester and until 2015 remained undefeated for 10 years. The Varsity2015 events attracted controversy following scuffles between students from each University during the Rugby Union match.

The Students' Union organises the Student-Led Teaching Awards which invites students to vote for outstanding teaching and support staff. The ceremony is held jointly with the university's Staff Excellence Awards at Cheltenham Town Hall.

=== Student services ===
The University of Gloucestershire launched the Degreeplus initiative in 2012 designed to give students the chance to increase their employability through volunteering, entrepreneurship and internships. A focus on skills development is channelled through the Degreeplus Award scheme, encouraging students to fully participate in university life, gain work-related experience and receive formal recognition for extra-curricular achievements.

The successful completion of the Degreeplus Award forms part of the learner's Higher Education Achievement Report (HEAR)

Student Helpzones are located on each campus, where students can go to receive advice, support and assistance on any issues.

=== Sport ===
The university's School of Sport and Exercise is one of the largest providers of sport and exercise programmes in the UK. It is a Centre of Excellence for elite women's rugby sevens and is the only university to own a professional rugby league team, the University of Gloucestershire All Golds.

The University of Gloucestershire has a long sporting tradition and, in particular, seven focus sports, Rugby League, Rugby Union, hockey, football, tennis, netball and volleyball.

The university has been at the forefront of developing rugby league at student level for nearly a decade. It has now moved into the professional ranks, with the Gloucestershire All Golds rugby league team entering Championship 1 in March 2013. In 2016 the All Golds also entered a team into the RFL Conference League South.

==== Sport Malawi ====
In 2012 the university's Sport Malawi initiative won gold at the London 2012 Games-inspired Podium Awards. The Malawi National Olympic team was hosted by the university, which worked in partnership with Gloucester City Council, Cheltenham Borough Council, Sandford Parks Lido, and Aspire Sports and Cultural Trust to create a Gloucestershire Consortium which provided facilities for the team during their preparations for the London 2012 Olympic Games.

Malawian athletes returned to the campus to train ahead of the 2014 Commonwealth Games.

=== Initiation rites and student behaviour ===
In October 2008, the university was subject to an investigation by journalists on student initiation rites, after the BBC obtained a copy of a secretly-filmed video featuring students with bags over their heads drinking and vomiting, overlooked by another student dressed in what the press described as a "Nazi officer uniform".

A further incident in December 2008 resulted in a Rugby Union club member vomiting on board a bus, following what a local newspaper called a "booze-fuelled initiation ceremony".

== Enterprise ==
The university and GFirst Local Enterprise Partnership (LEP), opened the Growth Hub on 1 October 2014.

In 2013, the university opened up its first Enterprise Hub. The Enterprise Hubs are aimed specifically at early-stage creative and innovative entrepreneur-run businesses offering physical and virtual support to help their development. There are four physical incubation sites across Gloucester and Cheltenham. The hubs offer both office space and business advice.

The Venture programme has been created by the university to offer lectures, workshops and mentoring in business for both students and alumni.

The university's Gloucestershire Enterprise Society, run by the Students' Union, offers students free business advice, talks and training as well as social events, trips and activities.

== People associated with the university ==
The university's Alumni Association has a global network of more than 39,000 former students and staff from the university and its constituent colleges. The Association produces a monthly newsletter, arranges events and can help to reunite old colleagues and friends.

=== Notable alumni ===
- Lewis Arnold (television director)
- Chris Beardshaw (television gardening expert)
- Henry Bond (writer and photographer)
- John Brunsdon (artist)
- Adam Buxton (Comedian)
- Chris Broad (cricketer)
- Jon Callard (England rugby union international)
- Tony Cragg (artist)
- PJ Crook (artist)
- Paul Day (sculptor)
- Zoe Derham (Commonwealth hammer thrower athlete)
- Peter Edwards (artist)
- David Gandy (model)
- Anne Hardy (artist)
- Mark Harrison (Photographer)
- Saffron Lane (ice hockey player)
- Richard Loncraine (film maker)
- Beverley Knight (singer-songwriter)
- Ruaridh McConnochie (England and GB rugby sevens)
- Jamie Owen (writer and broadcaster)
- Cornelia Parker (artist)
- Sarah Potter (England cricketer)
- Anita Taylor (artist)
- Lizzy Yarnold (Olympic skeleton gold medallist 2014 and 2018)
- Nyam-Osoryn Uchral (Prime Minister of Mongolia)
- Liz Durden-Myers (Senior Lecturer in Physical Education)

== See also ==
- Armorial of UK universities
- College of Education
- List of universities in the UK
