= List of presidents of the National Union of Students (United Kingdom) =

This article lists all Presidents of the National Union of Students in the United Kingdom.

In 2026, the position was abolished, replaced by four national-level presidents for England, Scotland, Wales and Northern Ireland (all but the first of these posts had existed previously but were sub-ordinate to the UK president.)

Presidents
#	Years of office	Name	Institution(s)	Faction
1	1922	Ivison S Macadam	King's College London	
2	1922–23	A Gordon Bagnall	University of Oxford	
3	1923–24	Ralph Nunn May	University of Birmingham	
4	1924–25	F G G Carr	University of Cambridge	
5	1925–26	W J Langford	University of Reading	
6	1926–27	J E Meredith	University of Wales, Bangor	
7	1927–29	Frank Ongley Darvall	University of Reading	
8	1929–30	Sam Cohen	University College, Cardiff	
9	1930–31	H Trevor Lloyd	University of Bristol	
10	1931–33	Denis Follows	University of London and University of Nottingham	
11	1933–34	Charles G Gilmore	University of London	
12	1934–36	Lincoln Ralphs	University of Sheffield	
13	1936–38	F Fraser Milne	University of London	
14	1938–39	R R S Ward	University of Sheffield	
15	1939–40	Brian Simon	University of Cambridge and University of London	
16	1940–41	P A H Rivett	University of Leeds	
17	1941–42	Sydney Checkland	University of Birmingham	
18	1942–44	Jack T Allanson	University of Manchester	
19	1944–46	A T James	University of London	
20	1946–47	G Mcleavy	University of Leeds	
21	1947–49	W Bonney Rust	University of London	
22	1949–51	Stanley K Jenkins	University College, Cardiff	
23	1951–52	John M Thompson	University of Manchester	
24	1952–54	Fred Jarvis	University of Oxford	
25	1954–56	Frank H Copplestone	University of Nottingham	
26	1956–58	Roland Freeman	University of London	
27	1958–60	Dennis J Grennan	University of Southampton	
28	1960–62	Gwyn Morgan	University of Wales, Aberystwyth	
29	1962–64	Aneurin Hughes	University of Wales, Aberystwyth	
30	1964–66	T William Savage	Queen's University of Belfast	
31	1966–68	T Geoff Martin	Queen's University of Belfast	
32	1968–69	Trevor Fisk	University of London	
33	1969–71	Jack Straw	University of Leeds	Radical Student Alliance
34	1971–73	Digby Jacks	University of London	Left Caucus (CPGB)
35	1973–75	John Randall	University of York	Independent
36	1975–77	Charles Clarke	University of Cambridge	Broad Left (NOLS)
37	1977–78	Sue Slipman	University of Wales, Lampeter	Broad Left (CPGB)
38	1978–80	Trevor Phillips	Imperial College London	Broad Left (non-aligned)
39	1980–82	David Aaronovitch	University of Manchester	Broad Left (CPGB)
40	1982–84	Neil Stewart	University of Aberdeen	NOLS
41	1984–86	Phil Woolas	University of Manchester	NOLS
42	1986–88	Vicky Phillips	University of East Anglia	NOLS
43	1988–90	Maeve Sherlock	University of Liverpool	NOLS
44	1990–92	Stephen Twigg	University of Oxford	NOLS
45	1992–94	Lorna Fitzsimons	Loughborough College	NOLS
46	1994–96	Jim Murphy	University of Strathclyde	Labour Students
47	1996–98	Douglas Trainer	University of Strathclyde	Labour Students
48	1998–2000	Andrew Pakes	University of Hull	Labour Students
49	2000–02	Owain James	University of Warwick	Organised Independent
50	2002–04	Mandy Telford	University of Strathclyde	Labour Students
51	2004–06	Kat Fletcher	Sheffield College and University of Leeds	Campaign for Free Education (2004–05); Independent (2005–06)
52	2006–08	Gemma Tumelty	Liverpool John Moores University	Organised Independent
53	2008–10	Wes Streeting	University of Cambridge	Labour Students
54	2010–11	Aaron Porter	University of Leicester	Organised Independent
55	2011–13	Liam Burns	Heriot-Watt University	Organised Independent
56	2013–15	Toni Pearce	Cornwall College	Organised Independent
57	2015–16	Megan Dunn	University of Aberdeen	Organised Independent
58	2016–17	Malia Bouattia	University of Birmingham	Liberation Left
59	2017–19	Shakira Martin	Lewisham and Southwark College	Independent
60	2019–20	Zamzam Ibrahim	University of Salford	Liberation Left
61	2020–22	Larissa Kennedy	University of Warwick	Liberation Left
62	2022	Shaima Dallali	City, University of London	Liberation Left
63	2024–26	Amira Campbell	University of Birmingham	Independent
