= Organised Independents =

UK student organization

- Founded: 1999; 27 years ago
- Type: Students' Union
- Location: London, UK
- Region served: United Kingdom
- Formerly called: Webberites, Owainites, Independent Faction

The Organised Independents (often abbreviated to OIs) are a grouping within the National Union of Students of the United Kingdom.

The group is made up of candidates for National Executive Committee posts, all standing on an "independent" label, and their supporters. As such, the OIs have been defined as an interest group as opposed to a faction; this originates from the idea that they are apolitical or moderate, either simply as a group of sabbatical officers seeking to support one another, or as proponents of a membership-focused national ideology. Commentator Rachel Brooks writes that the OIs also have a "shared concern to minimise the influence of 'the left'," which she defines as centring around the factions AWL, Liberation Left, and NCAFC.

== Ideology ==
While individual OIs have a broad range of political views and positions, from soft left to one-nation conservatism, the group as a whole holds a membership-focused ideology. The group advocates the NUS being more directly representative of its member SUs, often invoking the motto that 'they work for us'.

As a result, OI policy positions are often more socially left-wing than factions such as the Labour Students or Union of Jewish Students, but tend to avoid non-education policy areas prioritised by SLN or Liberation Left such as economic or foreign policy. An exception to this was on Brexit, which prominent OIs took a strong and embittered stance against, and the group led NUS' campaign for a second referendum.

== History ==
=== Background ===
As a result of the group's broad definition, a lot of controversy has raged over whether such a faction exists. Many NUS commentators are in agreement that such an organised grouping is clearly in existence. Various names were in use, including the "Webberites" (after Simon Webber, an early leading figure), the "Owainites" (after Owain James, NUS President 2000–2002), the "Independent Faction" before the term "Organised Independents" took hold. The phrase "independent student officers" was also prominent on many manifestos. Increasingly members of the grouping no longer dispute their existence and the label. However, there is still much dispute over whether or not individual independents are aligned to the OIs or not.

=== 1990–2002 ===
The OIs emerged as a group of independent candidates and NEC members who gave support to the Labour Students-dominated NUS leadership of the 1990s. Several admitted to being "members of the Labour Party but not Labour Students," a distinction that some found difficult to understand. Further confusion reigned as some OIs appeared to be members of Labour Students at the ordinary level. The group became increasingly prominent in 2000 when Labour Students declined to put up a candidate to defend the presidency of the NUS, a position which they had previously held for eighteen years, but instead backed Owain James as an independent, who won the post and held it for the two years allowed under the constitution. Former NUS LGB officer Carli Harper-Pennan wrote that at this time, the OIs were "aligned with Labour Students", "organised with them", and had "the same agenda".

=== 2002–2010 ===
The 2002 NUS elections saw the OIs and Labour Students fall out and run opposing candidates. In general the OIs defeated the Labour Students in all elections bar the presidency, which was won by Mandy Telford. Subsequently, the OIs and Labour Students fluctuated between co-operation at times, but fierce opposition at others. It was in this 2004-6 period that the later-Mayor of Islington Kat Fletcher of CFE/AWL was elected president; Fletcher was the first since 1981 to be elected from a political slate clearly to the left of either Labour Students or the OIs. In recent years there has therefore been renewed confusion over the exact membership of the OIs, stemming from a series of notable factional shifts within the NUS by several individuals and the emergence of more than one group of independents who organise together.

In 2007, though, the position was clear, and the independents who described themselves within NUS formally as OIs were Gemma Tumelty (National President), Stephen Brown (National Secretary), Ama Uzowuru (Vice-president Welfare), Adam McNicholas (Block of 12). Tumelty and Brown both left their respective posts in June 2008.

The Organised Independents continued to be popular within the national movement. 2008 saw Brown and Streeting on a collision course for the presidency, once again potentially fracturing relations between the OIs and the Labour Students. Brown subsequently decided not to run and there was an appearance of the 'Dirty Games' deal, the OIs were reported to have used Brown's withdrawal to secure the vice-president higher education position for Aaron Porter, in exchange for backing the later Labour MP Wes Streeting for president. In the 2008 elections, Porter was elected, while Ama Uzowuru was re-elected as vice-president (Welfare), and Ben Whittaker and Elizabeth Sommerville were elected onto the Block of 12. The Organised Independents were also in power in NUS Scotland, with Gurjit Singh holding Presidency in 2008. He was defeated in the following presidential election by Labour party member Liam Burns.

In 2009, Whittaker was elected as vice president welfare and Liz Williams (Liverpool Guild of Students) and Alice Bouquet (University of West England SU) were elected onto Block of 15 at National Conference. Katie Dalton was elected president of NUS Wales.

In 2010, Porter was elected as the 54th President of the National Union of Students. Whittaker was re-elected vice president (welfare). Peter Mercer and Ryan Wain were elected onto Block of 15. Katie Dalton was also re-elected President of NUS Wales.

=== 2010–2017 ===
In 2011, Peter Mercer was elected Vice-president Welfare following Ben Whittaker's two terms. Matthew East, two-term Anglia Ruskin Students' Union President, was elected onto the Block of 15. George-Konstantinos Charonis was elected as the NUS Postgraduate Taught Representative at the Postgraduate Conference.

The OIs were temporarily disbanded after this, until the 2017 National Conference. In 2013, however, Raechel Mattey and Colum McGuire were elected as VP Union Development and VP Welfare, respectively; they continued to campaign informally around moderate candidates and issues. Both were re-elected to serve a second term in 2014. Mattey grew unpopular, however; at the 2013 Union Development zone conference, she had refused to allow a NCAFC member of her zone committee to enter the accountability session, and gained a reputation for being unaccountable and afraid of challenge.

In 2015, following Mattey, Richard Brooks was elected vice president (union development). Vonnie Sandlan and Fergal McFerran were also elected Presidents of NUS Scotland and NUS-USI, respectively. In January 2017, Al Jazeera broadcast footage purporting to show that Brooks was involved in attempts to block the election of (and, later, discredit and remove) controversial President Malia Bouattia over allegations of antisemitism. In response to Bouattia's election, students at Durham, Loughborough, Hull, Aberystwyth, Oxford, Cambridge, Manchester, Essex, York, King's College London, Nottingham, UWE, Leicester, Queen Mary University of London and Reading University had campaigned to disaffiliate from the NUS. Lincoln, Newcastle, Hull and Loughborough all disaffiliated.

=== 2017–present ===
After this widespread discontentment with NUS' direction, the 2017 National Conference saw a slate of OI-backed candidates win five of the six full-time officer positions elected at NUS National Conference. In addition to this, several moderate motions passed, including democratic reforms designed to better engage students and students' unions, which were described as "the most comprehensive and wide-ranging structural reforms in NUS history". HE policy commentator Nona Buckley-Irvine wrote that with the "significant ideological shift from the hard left to more moderate candidates, sector bodies and universities will prepare themselves for a rethink in how to approach NUS going forward". However, Liberation Left candidate for VP Union Development Ali Milani would prove critical in blocking the reforms. All incumbent OI candidates were re-elected in 2018; Martin was re-elected with 51% of the vote in the first round of voting, along with deputy Amatey Doku, who received 68% after calling for nationwide student-led mobilisation to demand a 'people's vote' on the final Brexit deal.

At the 2019 national conference, the OIs focused campaigning efforts on again passing a programme of reforms - this time to prevent financial bankruptcy. The 2017 reforms had not been delivered, and several years of financial mismanagement had created a significant decline in resources. After five hours of debate, 700 delegates voted in favour of the package. OI candidate for VP Union Development Erica Ramos was elected to deliver reform; however, Liberation Left were successful in the remaining three elections, including national president. This came despite a breakdown in left-wing factional support, with the Student Left Network actively fielding candidates against LibLeft incumbents and campaigning for two left-leaning OI candidates.

== Brexit ==
In 2018, in response to the ongoing political instability around Brexit, the group launched FFS, a cross-party youth campaign for a second referendum. Key OI figures steered policy through the 2018 National Conference to ensure that NUS became one of the earliest organisations to declare support for the position.

The campaign subsequently organised an open letter undersigned by 120 student leaders, and numerous demonstrations, which attracted over 160,000 attendees.
