= National Union of Students Scotland =

- President: Sai Shraddha S. Viswanathan
- Founded: 1972
- Headquarters: 1 Papermill Wynd; McDonald Road; Edinburgh; EH7 4QL
- National affiliation: National Union of Students of the United Kingdom
- International affiliation: European Students' Union
- Website: www.nus.org.uk/scotland

The National Union of Students Scotland is an autonomous body within the National Union of Students (NUS). It is the national representative body of Scotland, and serves to protect and caring about Scottish students, having around 500,000 students that are pursuing higher education in Scotland. It was formed following the merger of NUS in Scotland with the Scottish Union of Students in 1971.

As of 2020, the president of NUS Scotland is the sole full-time elected officer and is elected for a two-year term. The current president is Sai Shraddha Suresh Viswanathan.

== Affiliated Students' Unions ==
Students' associations in Scotland which are affiliated to NUS:

Higher Education

- University of Aberdeen
- University of Abertay Dundee
- University of Edinburgh
- Glasgow Caledonian University
- Heriot-Watt University
- Edinburgh Napier University
- Open University
- Royal Conservatoire of Scotland
- The Robert Gordon University
- Stirling University
- University of Strathclyde
- University of the West of Scotland

Further Education

- Ayrshire College
- Borders College
- City of Glasgow College
- Dumfries and Galloway College
- Dundee and Angus College
- Edinburgh College
- Fife College
- Forth Valley College
- Glasgow Clyde College

- Glasgow Kelvin College
- New College Lanarkshire
- North East Scotland College
- South Lanarkshire College
- West College Scotland
- West Lothian College

Tertiary Education:

- University of the Highlands and Islands
- Scotland's Rural College

== NUS Scotland Officers ==
The full list of past officers of NUS Scotland are as follows:

=== NUS Scotland Chairpersons & Presidents ===
Current
Years of office	Name	Institution(s)	Faction
2024-2026	Sai Shraddha Suresh Viswanathan	University of Aberdeen	Independent
Past
2022–24	Ellie Gomersall	University of the West of Scotland	Scottish Young Greens
2020–22	Matt Crilly	University of Strathclyde	Independent
2018–20	Liam McCabe	University of Strathclyde	Independent
2017–18	Luke Humberstone	University of the Highlands and Islands	Independent
2015–17	Vonnie Sandlan	University of the West of Scotland	Organised Independents
2013–15	Gordon Maloney	University of Aberdeen	NCAFC
2011–13	Robin Parker	University of Aberdeen	Independent
2009–11	Liam Burns	Heriot-Watt University	Independent
2008–09	Gurjit Singh	University of Strathclyde	Organised Independents
2006–08	James Alexander	Heriot-Watt University	Labour Students (2006/07); Independent (2007/08)
2004–06	Melanie Ward	Stirling University	Labour Students
2002–04	Rami Okasha	University of Aberdeen	Labour Students
2000–02	Mandy Telford	University of Strathclyde	Labour Students
1998-00	Richard Baker	University of Aberdeen	Labour Students
1997–98	Shamin Akhtar	University of Abertay Dundee	Labour Students
1996–97	Keith Robson	University of Strathclyde	Labour Students
1994–96	Douglas Trainer	University of Strathclyde	Labour Students
1992–94	Jim Murphy	University of Strathclyde	Labour Students
1991–92	Derek Munn	University of Aberdeen	Labour Students
1989–91	Donna MacKinnon	Glasgow College of Technology	Labour Students
1988–89	Benny McLaughlin	Glasgow College of Technology	Labour Students
1986–88	Pauline McNeill	Glasgow College of Building and Printing	Labour Students
1984–86	Alan Smart	Jordanhill College of Education	Labour Students
1982–84	Bob McLean	University of Aberdeen	Labour Students
1981–82	Neil Stewart	Aberdeen College of Commerce	Labour Students
1979–81	Jeane Freeman	Glasgow College of Technology
1978–79	Martin Currie	Stirling University	Broad Left (Young Communist League)
1977–78	Alan Christie	Heriot-Watt University
1975–77	Stewart McIntosh	University of Strathclyde
1973–75	Doug Harrison	Jordanhill College of Education
1972–73	Stuart Paul	Heriot-Watt University
1971–72	Doug Henderson	University of Strathclyde	Broad Left – Labour Party

=== NUS Scotland Depute Presidents & Vice Presidents Education (2002–19) ===
Years of office	Name	Institution of Origin
Past (Position Abolished)
2018–19	Gemma Jones	Scotland's Rural College
2017–18	Jodie Waite	Glasgow Caledonian University
2015–17	Rob Henthorn	University of Aberdeen
2013–15	Robert Foster	Glasgow Caledonian University
2011–13	Graeme Kirkpatrick	Aberdeen College
2010–11	Jennifer Cadiz	Robert Gordon University
2009	Elaine Ner (resigned)	Carnegie College
2008–09	Liam Burns	Heriot Watt University
2006–08	Jill Little	University of Paisley
2005–06	James Alexander	Heriot Watt University
2004–05	Phyl Meyer	University of Strathclyde
2003–04	Melanie Ward	University of Stirling
2002–03	Ross Renton	University of Strathclyde

=== NUS Scotland Women's Officer (1992–2020) ===
Years of office	Name	Institution of Origin
Past (Position Abolished)
2019–20	Sorcha Kirker	University of the Highlands & Islands
2017–19	Shuwanna Aaron	University of Edinburgh
2016–17	Angela Alexander	Ayrshire College
2015–16	Emily Beever	University of Aberdeen
2014–15	Vonnie Sandlan	University of the West of Scotland
2012–14	Stacey Devine	Reid Kerr College
2010–12	Kelley Temple	University of Strathclyde
2008–10	Kainde Manji	University of Stirling
2006–08	Sarah Watson	Queen Margaret University
2004–06	Jenny Duncan	University of Aberdeen
2003–04	Vivienne Potter	Glasgow Caledonian University
2001–03	Morven Proctor	University of Stirling
2000–01	Mary McLean	Glasgow Caledonian University
1999–00	Mandy Telford	University of Strathclyde
1998–99	Rachel Cashman
1997–98	Honor Cohen	Heriot-Watt University
1996–97	Elspeth Alexandra	University of Stirling
1995–96	Shamin Akhtar	University of Abertay Dundee
1994–95	Sally McGreevy	Jordanhill
1993–94		University of Stirling
1992–93	Siobhan Endean	Dundee Institute of Technology

=== NUS Scotland Vice President Communities (2012–20) ===
Years of office	Name	Institution of Origin
Past (Position Abolished)
2019 - 20	Jeron Van Herk	Abertay University
2017–19	Elena Semple	City of Glasgow College / University of Stirling
2016–17	Conor Marshall	Abertay University
2015–16	Gary Paterson	University of Strathclyde
2014–15	Kirsty Haigh	Edinburgh University
2013–14	Sinéad Wylie	Glasgow Caledonian University
2012–13	Gordon Maloney	University of Aberdeen

== See also ==
- Student wings of political parties in Scotland

Equivalent autonomous bodies within National Union of Students of the United Kingdom:

- NUS Wales (UCMC)
- NUS-USI (Northern Ireland)

National organisation:

- National Union of Students
