= National Union of Students Disabled Students' Campaign =

British disability rights campaign

The National Union of Students Disabled Students' Campaign was a self-running part of the National Union of Students which existed to "remove the stigma from all disabilities, and to encourage all members of our society to take a positive attitude towards understanding the nature of disability and overcoming prejudices".

== Annual conference ==
The NUS Disabled Students Campaign conference is an opportunity for Disabled Students Campaign students activists from across the UK to come together to set the direction for the campaign for the year ahead, to attend workshops and hear speakers, and to network with other disabled students.

One of the key functions of the conference is to debate, pass policy which forms the basis of NUS Disabled Students' campaigning and to amend the constitution of the campaign. All changes to policy and the constitution are submitted by Disabled students or societies, up to 5 for each, previous to the conference which are then compiled by the steering committee.

At the conference there is the annual NUS Disabled Students Awards, which started in 2007, to help promote and support the societies which have done things that are considered to be above and beyond the standard.

Officers and committee members are elected at the annual conference by delegates.

=== National officers ===
The National officer within the Disabled Students campaign is an elected paid official who coordinates and fulfills the agenda of the campaign. Currently the elected officer is Rachel O'Brien, who is in her first term of office, and who took over from James Elliott in July 2017.

There is one officer for the NUS Disabled Students Campaign, which is open to anyone who identifies within the membership of the Disabled Students campaign. The officer can only stand for two years before having to step down.

The first national officers were elected in 2000, after NUS Annual Conference voted to change the constitution in order for the positions to be created.

=== Committee members ===
Committee Members are elected representatives which help prioritise the agenda of the campaign and fulfill it. There are currently twelve positions on the committee of nine types. The maximum term in office is two years in each type, and the representative must be elected each year.

==== 2nd NEC representative ====
The Disabled Students' Officer sits on the main governing body of the NUS, the National Executive Council (NEC). The campaign also has a second seat on the NEC, and this place is an open place, as in any student can run for it.

==== Further education ====
The further education representative is elected by delegates who are in further education and is in Further Education at the time of election. There is currently one positions as a Further Education representative. The representative is elected to help tackle the lack of participation within the liberation campaign despite the majority of NUS's membership being Further Education and to improve further education for Disabled people.

==== International ====
The international representative is elected by delegates who identify as international students and can only be run for by someone who identifies as such. There is currently one international representative. They are elected to ensure international students are represented in the campaign.

==== Black ====
The black representative comes from and are elected by a caucus of delegates who identify as black, or other ethnic minority. There is currently one position as black representative. They are elected to help tackle racism in the campaign and support black Disabled people in society and education.

==== LGBT ====
The LGBT representative comes from and are elected by a caucus of delegates who identify as LGBT. There is currently one position as LGBT representative. They are elected to help tackle LGBT issues in the campaign and support Disabled LGBT people in society and education.

==== Trans ====
The black representative comes from and are elected by a caucus of delegates who identify as Trans. There is currently one position as trans representative. They are elected to help tackle trans issues in the campaign and support trans people in society and education.

==== Open place x2 ====
The open representatives are elected by delegates and can be contested by any delegate. There are currently two positions as open representatives. They are elected to help the campaign in general.

==== Women's place x2 ====
The women's place representatives come from and are elected by a caucus of delegates who self identify as women. There are currently two positions as women's representatives. They are elected to tackle sexism and help the campaign in general.

==== Nations officers x3 ====
Each of the NUS Nations (Scotland, Wales and Northern Ireland) have their own regional autonomous Disabled Students Campaigns, and these regional officers also sit on the committee.

== Steering committee ==
The committee is elected to set the agenda and compile the submitted motions and amendments for annual conference.
