= Liberation Left =

UK student organization

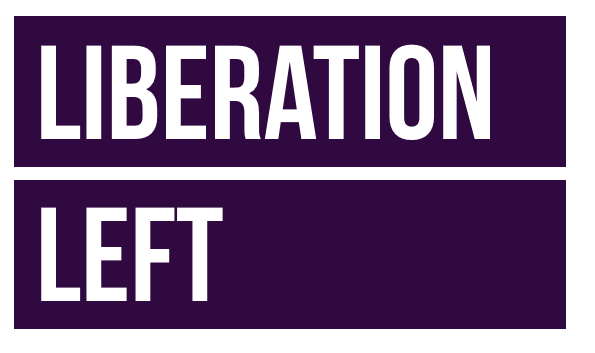
- Founded: 1997; 29 years ago
- Type: Student Union
- Location: London, UK
- Region served: The United Kingdom and the Republic of Ireland
- Website: studentbroadleft.org.uk
- Formerly called: Student Broad Left

Liberation Left (formerly Student Broad Left or SBL) is a factional grouping operating within the National Union of Students of the United Kingdom.

The group was formed in 1997 as a split from the Campaign for Free Education (CFE) and first contested NUS elections in 1998. It is characterised by its vocal support for the NUS Liberation Campaigns, Palestinian rights and for free-to-student, state-funded education, and its determined opposition to racism, Islamophobia, fascism, and war. The group describes itself as a "network of left activists campaigning for a progressive student movement", and has Labour, Green, and independent members. Today, the group has members in Labour parliamentary candidacies and its National Executive Committee.

The group should not be confused with the principally CPGB, Labour, and Liberal grouping known as Broad Left, which held the NUS presidency between 1973 and 1984.

== Background ==
In most years, Student Broad Left formed a slate with the Campaign for Free Education and Socialist Workers' Student Society, to increase the number of socialist candidates elected. This assisted the group in ensuring it has almost always had a least one member elected to the NUS Executive. In the 2004 NUS elections the CFE and SWSS split and stood against each other. Student Broad Left and the CFE negotiated a slate for some places, but in the proportional representation "Block of 12" election, Student Broad Left supported transfers to SWSS over CFE. Student Broad Left candidate Peter Leary polled 2nd in the Block of 12 in 2004 and 2005 coming behind only Labour Students. George Woods was Student Broad Left's Block of 12 member for 2006-8.

Opponents of Student Broad Left claim that many of the founders of the group, including all SBL candidates to the NUS National Executive Committee, have been closely linked to Socialist Action, pointing out that the Student Broad Left supports the same campaigns as Socialist Action, for example the Student Assembly Against Racism, Unite Against Fascism, Student CND, and Cuban solidarity. Though these allegations are levelled at SBL members with some regularity, the list of organisations could cover many left wing groups and individuals, and is not indicative of any particular faction.

In 2008, Student Broad Left had mixed fortunes. During the 2008 NUS Annual Conference, Student Broad Left formed a slate with Student Respect putting forward Ruqayyah Collector, NUS Black Students' Officer 2006-8, as candidate for NUS National President. Bryony Shanks was put forward as candidate for NUS National Treasurer and the Block of 12. Neither Ruqayyah or Bryony were elected.

Student Broad Left has become much more active in 2010, and co-hosted the Progressive Students Conference with the National Black Students' Alliance in October 2010, attracting high-profile speakers including Ken Livingstone, Salma Yaqoob, Adrian Ramsay, Emily Thornberry, and more from organisations including CND, Unite Against Fascism, UCU, and the NUS.

SBL logo, circa 2010

Kanja Sesay, NUS Black Students' Officer, and Joshi Sachdeo were Student Broad Left members of the NUS Executive for 2010–11.

NUS National Conference 2011 saw the election of Student Broad Left's Aaron Kiely to the Block of 15. Kiely joined Sesay and Sachdeo on the NUS Executive for 2011–12.

NUS conference 2012 saw Student Broad Left's Kanja Sesay run for president against incumbent Liam Burns, VP HE Usman Ali and VP UD Ed Marsh. Sesay gained 120 votes in the first round. A joint Student Broad Left and Young Greens candidate, Matt Stanley, was elected to the Block of 15, and Aaron Kiely was elected as Black Students' Officer.

== Rebrand ==
In 2016, following the successful election of controversial SBL-backed candidate Malia Bouattia, SBL restructured under the brand of 'Liberation Left'. Prominent figures continued vocal support for the NUS Liberation Campaigns, Palestinian rights and opposition to Islamophobia.

Several Liberation Left figures have since been accused of antisemitism. NEC members Ayo Olatunji and Ali Milani have both been embroiled in rows around antisemitic Twitter comments, with Milani having tweeted "Israel has no right to exist". Former President Bouattia was condemned by 300 Jewish student leaders, the Union of Jewish Students and the Home Affairs Select Committee. Bouattia's comments, described as "outright racism" by the Committee, triggered fifteen disaffiliation campaigns at member unions.

== 2019 victories ==
At the 2019 national conference, there was another breakdown in left-wing factional support, with the CFE-descendant Student Left Network actively fielding candidates against LibLeft incumbents and campaigning for two left-wing candidates. However, moderate factions were in decline; the OIs had been focused on Brexit and NUS reform, and Labour Students had faced ten disaffiliations after a democracy scandal. Liberation Left were successful in three of the four national elections, including electing Zamzam Ibrahim as National President.

== See also ==
- Tuition fees in the United Kingdom
