= Aneurin Hughes =

British diplomat (1937–2020)

Aneurin Rhys "Nye" Hughes (11 February 1937 – 27 March 2020) was a British diplomat known for his long involvement with the European Commission. He was the EU Ambassador to Norway and Iceland from 1987 to 1995 and to Australia and New Zealand from 1995 to 2002.

Hughes was born in Swansea, Wales, and was fluent in both English and Welsh. He attended Swansea Grammar School, and also spent a year abroad in the U.S. at Oregon City High School, on an AFS exchange. Hughes went on to the University College Wales, Aberystwyth, graduating in 1961 with a double degree in Celtic studies and philosophy. He was president of the Aberystwyth University Students' Union. He later began a PhD at the University of London on the subject of higher education in South America, which he did not complete. From 1962 to 1964, Hughes was president of the National Union of Students. He succeeded another Welshman, Gwyn Morgan. Hughes joined the Foreign Office in 1966. He was first secretary to the British High Commissioner to Singapore from 1968 to 1970, and then first secretary to the Ambassador to Italy from 1972 to 1973.

In 1973, Hughes joined the European Civil Service. He was head of the Division for Internal Coordination until 1976, and then served as an advisor to the Director-General for Information from 1977 to 1980. From 1981 to 1985, Hughes was chief of staff to Ivor Richard, the European Commissioner for Employment, Social Affairs and Inclusion. He was then EU Ambassador to Norway and Iceland from 1987 to 1995, and EU Ambassador to Australia and New Zealand from 1995 to 2002. To coincide with the 2003 Rugby World Cup, the Government of the Australian Capital Territory appointed him as a liaison officer for visiting European businesspeople. In 2005, Hughes published a biography of Billy Hughes (no relation), the seventh Prime Minister of Australia and a fellow Welshman. John Button, writing for Eureka Street, called it "a thought-provoking account of an extraordinary figure about whom we now know a great deal more than before".

== See also ==
- List of presidents of the National Union of Students
