= Gemma Tumelty =

British trade unionist

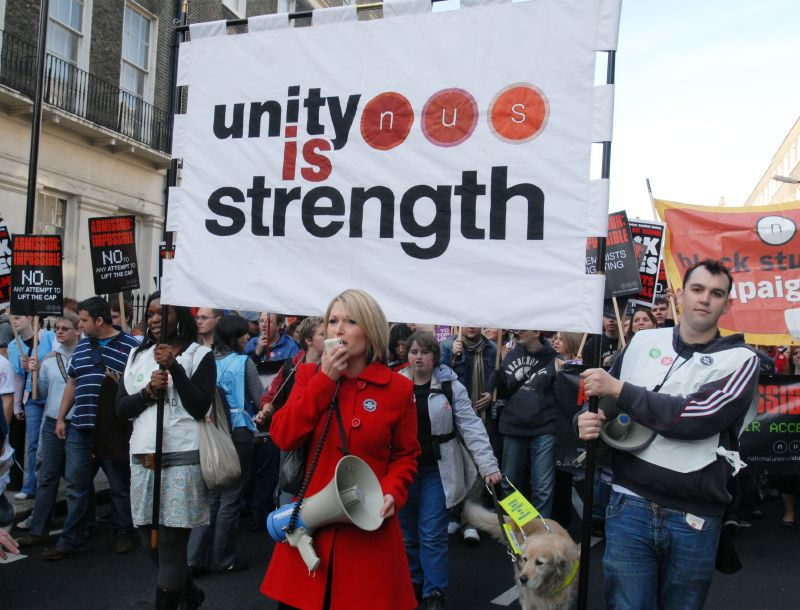
- Tumelty in 2006

52nd President of the National Union of Students
- In office March 2006 – 30 June 2008
- Preceded by: Kat Fletcher
- Succeeded by: Wes Streeting

Personal details
- Born: 20 October 1980 (age 45) Weston-Super-Mare, Somerset, England
- Party: Labour
- Education: Liverpool John Moores University

Gemma Tumelty (born 20 October 1980) is known for being a British Labour Party and Trades Union activist, who was President of the National Union of Students (NUS) from 2006 to 2008. She was the NUS National Secretary from 2005 to 2006, and a member of its National Executive Committee for two years before that.

Tumelty is now Global Director (Advocacy and Communications) at The LEGO Foundation.

== Early life ==
Tumelty was born in Weston-super-Mare, and grew up in Burnham-on-Sea. Raised in a single parent family, she was educated in Cheddar. The family moved to Hertfordshire during her later teens, but returned to Somerset once Gemma and her older sister went to university. Tumelty graduated in psychology from Liverpool John Moores University in 2005.

== NUS President ==
Tumelty was previously Women's Officer and then Vice President Welfare in Liverpool Students' Union. She was elected as National Secretary of the NUS in April 2005 at the NUS Conference in Blackpool.

Tumelty was first elected NUS President in March 2006, being the first NUS president from a post-1992 university. Although she was a member of the Labour Party she was not a candidate of its student wing, Labour Students, and ran for president with the description independent. She is part of the Organised Independents faction. There were six other candidates, including a member of the Education Not for Sale campaign, candidates from Conservative Future and Liberal Democrat Youth and Students, and two more independents/labour party independents.

In 2006, Tumelty led the NUS in signing an accord with the Trades Union Congress (TUC). Motivated by the increasing number of students who are taking-up employment to fund their education, the agreement will see the NUS and TUC working together to encourage students to join a trade union.

Tumelty was re-elected on 28 March 2007 and served a full term until July 2008 when she was succeeded by Labour Students's Wes Streeting. Her opponents in 2007 were Sofie Buckland, a member of Education Not for Sale and an officer on the NUS National Executive, and Rob Owen, a member of RESPECT and General Secretary of the University of Manchester Students' Union.

She wrote a weekly blog for the Education section of The Guardian. In 2006 she became the first NUS president to address the TUC Conference.

== Career ==
Upon leaving NUS, Tumelty joined Million+, a university think tank representing former polytechnic universities as Press and Public Affairs Manager. She also served as a co-opted member of the management committee of Compass – a centre left pressure group.

Gemma Tumelty started work in the International Department of the TUC in 2009 and then worked in the Campaigns and Communications Department, organising domestic, mostly public sector, anti-cuts campaigns and TUC annual congress.

In 2011 Tumelty became a trustee of Kick 4 Life, a charity which uses the power of football and sport to transform the lives of some of the most disadvantaged boys and girls in the world.

In 2012 Tumelty was shortlisted to become the Prospective Parliamentary Candidate for the Bristol West constituency, but lost to Thangam Debbonaire despite high-profile backing from senior politicians such as Jon Cruddas and Emily Thornberry.

In July 2013 Tumelty left her position as Campaigns and Events Officer at the TUC to join the Office of the Leader of the Opposition Ed Miliband as the Stakeholder Relations Manager. She left this position in May 2014 to return to Bristol.

In 2017 she was Managing Director of The HR Dept, a human resources business founded by her mother in 2002 in Bristol. In 2020, she became Global Director (Advocacy and Communications) at The LEGO Foundation.

Political offices
Preceded by Kat Fletcher	President of the National Union of Students; 2006–2008	Succeeded by Wes Streeting
