= Kat Fletcher =

British Labour Party politician

Cllr Kat Fletcher

Mayor of Islington
- In office 13 May 2016 – 11 May 2017
- Preceded by: Richard Greening
- Succeeded by: Una O’Halloran

Deputy Mayor of Islington
- In office 15 May 2015 – 12 May 2016
- Preceded by: Richard Greening
- Succeeded by: Una O’Halloran

Islington Borough Councillor for St George's Ward
- In office 21 March 2013 – 1 November 2019
- Preceded by: Jessica Asato

51st President of the National Union of Students
- In office 2004 – March 2006
- Preceded by: Mandy Telford
- Succeeded by: Gemma Tumelty

Personal details
- Born: Kathryn Jane Fletcher; 20 December 1979 (age 46) Sheffield, South Yorkshire, England
- Party: Labour
- Education: University of Leeds

Kathryn "Kat" Jane Fletcher (born 20 December 1979) is a British Labour Party politician. In May 2016, she was sworn in as the Mayor of Islington, having served as a councillor of the borough's St George's Ward since 2013. She was previously president of the National Union of Students, between 2004 and 2006, the first to be elected from a political slate to the left of Labour Students.

== Early life ==
Born in Sheffield, Fletcher was the General Secretary of Sheffield College's students' union, where she joined the Campaign for Free Education (CFE) and the Alliance for Workers' Liberty, a small Trotskyist group. She later attended the University of Leeds where she studied Social Policy and Education. After studying for two years, she was elected as the NUS National Women's Officer, and subsequently to the NUS Block of Twelve part-time officers. She then returned to Leeds, graduating in 2004.

== NUS president ==
She was elected president in 2004 in an extremely close contest, which she won by only two votes after six rounds of transfers, having lost the 2003 election by only three votes to the incumbent candidate. Although a long-standing member of the Labour Party, she ran on a leftist platform as a member of the Campaign for Free Education (CFE) criticising the NUS proximity to Tony Blair's Labour government, particularly on the issue of tuition fees. After being elected she pushed through a process of NUS reform which she claimed was necessary to save the organisation from financial crisis.

She left the AWL before being elected president; during her first year in office, she disbanded CFE, as a result of reinstating free education policy. It was at this point that the AWL and other left-wing activists such as the CFE's successor organisation Education Not for Sale came into sharp opposition to her.

In 2005, she stood for re-election without any description, winning by the largest margin in NUS history. Other candidates standing included Conservative Future's candidate Michael Champion and the Socialist Workers' Student Society candidate Suzie Wylie.

== Career ==
After her presidency, Fletcher worked for two years (2006–08) at the Centre for Excellence in Leadership, a government quango in the Further Education sector. Between 2008 and January 2010 she worked as Director of Policy and Development for the 157 Group. In 2010, she started volunteering for Ed Miliband's Labour Leadership Campaign, being subsequently appointed as head of volunteers for the duration of the campaign.

Fletcher stood as a Labour candidate at St. George's ward in the London Borough of Islington March 2013 by-election, and was elected as a councillor with relative ease. She was subsequently re-elected in the 2014 Islington London Borough Council election. Fletcher acted as election agent for Jeremy Corbyn in the 2015 general election, and was subsequently a part of Corbyn's campaign team when he won the 2015 Labour Party leadership election.

In 2015, Fletcher was appointed the Deputy Mayor of Islington. The following year she was sworn in as Mayor, a post she held until May 2017. She selected the Ben Kinsella Trust as her designated charity.

In November 2019, she announced her decision to resign from Islington Council. During the 2020 Labour Party leadership election, she worked for Keir Starmer's campaign as Director of Field. Fletcher now works as a regional official for the GMB trade union.

Political offices
Preceded by Mandy Telford	President of the National Union of Students; 2004–2006	Succeeded by Gemma Tumelty
