= Geoffrey Martin (politician) =

British diplomat (born 1940)

Thomas Geoffrey Martin OBE (born 26 July 1940) is a politician from Northern Ireland and the longest-serving head of the Representation of the European Commission in the United Kingdom. He led the offices in London, Belfast, Cardiff and Edinburgh during the years from the completion of the Single Market until after the Maastricht Treaty was ratified (1993–2003). He was appointed an the Order of the British Empire (OBE) in the 2002 New Year Honours.

== Early life and education ==
Martin was born in the Irish border town of Newry and lived in and around the townland of Mullaghglass and the linen village of Bessbrook in South Armagh until his late teens. He attended Bessbrook Public Elementary School, Newry Grammar School and Queens University Belfast where he played for the hockey First XI. He graduated with an honours degree in Geography in 1964.

== NUS involvement ==
At Queens he was president of the Students Representative Council. In 1964 he was elected Vice President for International Affairs of the National Union of Students. In that year the NUS was voted out of the International Student Conference by left wing and Communist Party influences within its membership.

In 1966 he was elected President of the NUS. It voted to rejoin the International Student Conference. In 1967 he was elected chairman of the Supervision Committee of the International Student Conference.

== Early career ==
Martin joined merchant bank Hill Samuel in 1969, and after two years, the ship broking and insurance company Seascope.

In 1972 he was appointed director of the national housing charity Shelter but left in 1973.

He stood as the Labour Party candidate for Ludlow at the February 1974 general election, but was unsuccessful, finishing third of three candidates with 23.53% of the vote.

In the autumn of 1974 he joined the diplomatic staff of the Commonwealth Secretariat.

== European Commission ==
=== Northern Ireland Office ===
In 1977 Martin took part in an open competition to become the inaugural head of the European Commission office in Northern Ireland, and was appointed in 1979 after a selection process closely monitored by the governments in London, Belfast and Dublin. His candidacy was supported by the three Northern Ireland MEPs John Hume, Ian Paisley and John Taylor, each of them major political figures in the three opposing political parties of the Province.

The Northern Ireland office opened early in 1980. Martin developed relationships across the full spectrum of party politics including with the paramilitary organisations and with the direct rule administration in Belfast and the Government of Ireland in Dublin. He met a Provisional Sinn Féin delegation in his office, led by its president Gerry Adams.

On the tenth anniversary of the accession to the European Community, he hosted a televised dinner in Belfast. The major speakers were the Rt Hon Edward Heath and the Irish Taoiseach Garret Fitzgerald, the second Irish Prime Minister ever to have spoken in public in Northern Ireland.

He organised a tour of 10 cities in the USA with a delegation of Northern Ireland politicians, journalists and business people including John Hume and Ian Paisley.

=== Delegation of the European Commission to the Association of South East Asian Nations ===
After five years, early in 1985, Martin was posted to South East Asia, based in Bangkok, to the Delegation of the European Commission to the Association of South East Asian Nations, as the head of the Press and Information Service.

=== The European Commission Representation in the United Kingdom ===
Martin was posted to the London Office of the European Commission in 1987 as Head of External Relations and Regional Programmes. He developed regionally-focused relationships with political and business leaders and the media, leading up to the completion of the Single Market in 1992.

He was appointed head of the EU Representation to the UK in 1993; his term of office came to an end in 2002

== Commonwealth Secretariat ==
He was seconded by the commission to the Office of the Commonwealth Secretary General in 2003.

Martin retired from the commission in 2005 but remained in the Office of the Commonwealth Secretary General until 2015.

== Later career ==
Martin established the Johnson Martin Associates consultancy partnership in 2003.

== Personal life ==
Martin married Gay Brownrigg, a barrister, in July 1968 in the Temple Church, London. They have four children.
