= Douglas Trainer =

British trade unionist (born 1971)

Douglas Andrew Trainer (born 7 January 1971) is a former President of the National Union of Students of the United Kingdom (NUS) from 1996 to 1998, having served the previous two years as President of NUS Scotland, winning both as the Labour Students candidate.

== Early life ==
He attended the RC St Lucy's primary school in Abronhill. Around this time, in 1980, the iconic Scottish film Gregory's Girl was filmed in this part of Cumbernauld.

== Career ==
He worked for, and become a partner in, public relations company Luther Pendragon, and in 2006 became a special adviser to the Scottish Executive.

After Labour's defeat in the Scottish Parliament election, 2007, Trainer worked for Serco as Communications Director for their Civil Government Business and then for Newham Council.

== Personal life ==
He was formerly married to government headhunter Andrea Bainger.

Political offices
Preceded by Jim Murphy	President of the National Union of Students; 1996–1998	Succeeded by Andrew Pakes
