= SWSS =

SWSS may stand for:

- Socialist Workers' Student Society
- South Wales Socialist Society
