= Toni Pearce =

British union leader

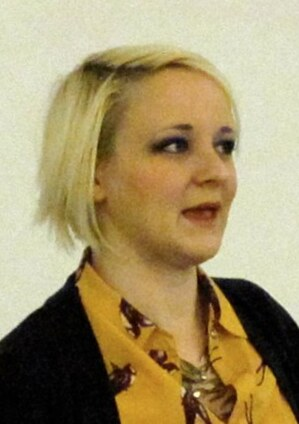
- Pearce in 2013

56th President of the National Union of Students
- In office 1 July 2013 – 30 June 2015
- Preceded by: Liam Burns
- Succeeded by: Megan Dunn
- Majority: 301 (41.8%)

Personal details
- Born: 13 April 1990 (age 36)
- Education: Cornwall College

Toni Pearce (born 13 April 1990) is a former President of the National Union of Students in the United Kingdom. Pearce was elected at the 2013 NUS National Conference in April 2013 and re-elected April 2014.

From 2011 to 2013, Pearce held the position of NUS Vice President (Further Education). Before that, she was President at the Students' Union of Cornwall College, an institution of Further Education. Pearce was the first ever NUS President not to have attended university.

== Early life ==
Pearce attended Cornwall College from the age of 16; however, she was diagnosed with Ehlers–Danlos Syndrome Type III, which meant that she missed a large number of lessons whilst in hospital recovering from operations. As such, Pearce failed two of her AS levels at the first attempt.

== Political affiliation ==
During the elections for NUS President (2013, 2014) Pearce stood as a candidate with no official affiliation to a student political faction. However, Pearce is a member of the Labour Party.

Political offices
Preceded by Liam Burns	President of the National Union of Students; 2013-2015	Succeeded by Megan Dunn
