= Shakira Martin (NUS president) =

British student politician (born 1988)

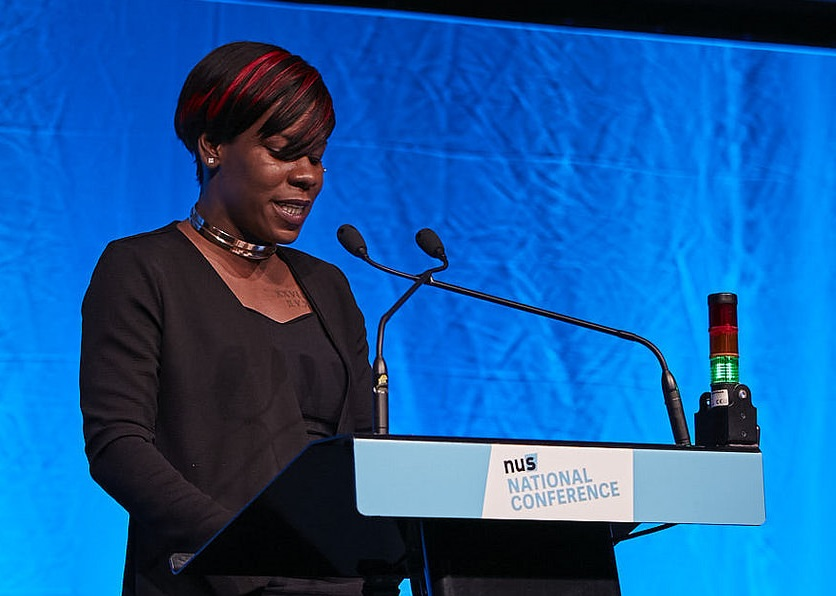
- Martin addressing the 2017 NUS National Conference in Brighton.

59th President of the National Union of Students
- In office 3 July 2017 – 3 July 2019
- Preceded by: Malia Bouattia
- Succeeded by: Zamzam Ibrahim

Vice President for Further Education
- In office 23 April 2015 – 3 July 2017
- Preceded by: Joe Vinson
- Succeeded by: Emily Chapman

Personal details
- Born: 1988 (age 37–38)
- Education: Lewisham and Southwark College

Shakira Martin (born 1988) is a British student politician and former president of the National Union of Students.

In April 2017, Martin, the union's vice-president for further education, defeated the incumbent Malia Bouattia, receiving 56% of the vote. After Bouttia's leadership of the NUS was marred by allegations of antisemitism, Martin pledged "unity", "pragmatism", and to put the "NUS back into the hands of its membership". She describes herself as a black working-class single mother, and comes from a Jamaican family background. She was the first Black female NUS president and first woman from the African-Caribbean community to serve as NUS President, and the second not to have studied at university.

In March 2018, Martin was re-elected to a second term with 51% of the vote in the first round.

== Early life and career ==
=== Early life ===
Martin was one of nine siblings raised in Lewisham, south-east London, by Jamaican parents. She left home at 16 and admits to having been involved in drug dealing for a month when she was in need of money. She then had two children, before gaining a diploma in education and training from Lewisham and Southwark College, becoming President of the College Students' Union.

=== NUS Vice-President Further Education ===
At the NUS 2015 National Conference in Liverpool, Martin was elected as NUS' Vice President for Further Education by 141 votes to 55, following Joe Vinson. In the position, she led a campaign to raise the profile of the impact of government post-16 area reviews on learners, and was a "strong advocate for the learner and apprentice voice".

Martin was then re-elected for another term in April 2016; she was uncontested for the post and won at stage one, with 152 votes compared to 11 votes to re-open nominations. She expanded the previous campaign, and worked on a research project with former Secretary of State for Business, Innovation and Skills Sir Vince Cable into how major FE reforms should be tailored for learners. The report was published in Autumn 2017.

== Presidency of NUS ==
Upon taking office in July 2017; she met with the Union of Jewish Students to "build back trust" and "start taking seriously the concerns Jewish students have raised".

Martin's key initiative was to launch a commission into addressing student poverty, which made 40 recommendations and was positively received by Universities UK and the University Alliance. In March 2018, Martin was re-elected to a second term with 51% of the vote in the first round of voting, along with deputy Amatey Doku; the latter received 68% after calling for nationwide student-led mobilization to demand a 'people’s vote' on the final Brexit deal. Martin reaffirmed her commitment to 'fight student poverty, defend student rights [and] create a truly united NUS', reaching out to welcome 'Tories' and 'Lib Dems' within the union.

Her second term was dominated by tackling NUS's financial situation, as the organisation faced bankruptcy over a £3m deficit. Martin wrote to members that the union would be "taking urgent action to stabilise", with reforms being developed for "consideration and refinement with the help of our members". Martin faced criticism for developing a drastic programme of financial, governance and campaigning reforms for approval by the union's National Conference; amidst this, she described the President role as an "awful job" on social media. After around five hours of debate at the conference, 700 delegates voted in favour of the package. Martin welcomed the vote, calling it a "momentous decision to endorse reform and deliver the vision of members".

Martin was succeeded by Zamzam Ibrahim in July 2019.
