= Liam Burns (NUS president) =

British trade unionist (born 1984)

55th President of the National Union of Students
- In office 1 July 2011 – 30 June 2013
- Preceded by: Aaron Porter
- Succeeded by: Toni Pearce

Personal details
- Born: 27 December 1984 (age 41)
- Party: Labour
- Education: Heriot-Watt University
- Occupation: CEO Scouts Canada

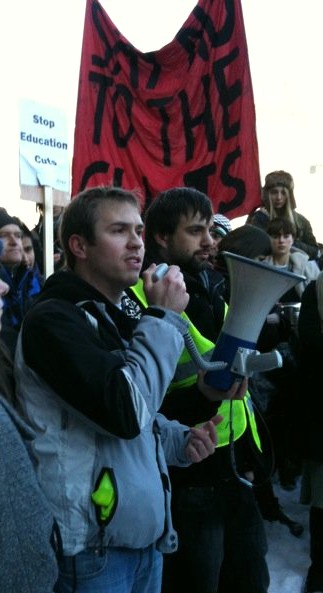
NUS President Liam Burns

Liam Burns is a former president of the National Union of Students in the United Kingdom. He took office on 1 July 2011, succeeding outgoing president Aaron Porter. Burns stood for NUS President as an independent but is a member of the Labour Party.

== Career ==
Burns studied physics at Heriot-Watt University before being elected as Vice-president [Education & Welfare] (2006–2007) and subsequently President (2007–2008) of the university's Students' Association. While at Heriot Watt he was a member of the rowing club

He went on to serve as NUS Scotland's Deputy President from 2008 to 2009 and as the organisation's president in 2009–2010 and again in 2010–2011, before being elected as NUS President in 2011.

Burns, who supported the idea of a graduate tax to finance education in England, Wales and Northern Ireland, was re-elected by delegates at NUS National Conference in April 2012 after running on a manifesto criticising government cuts to education.

After leaving the NUS in 2013, Burns has worked with The Scout Association, most recently as Chief Programme Officer.

He became the Executive Commissioner and chief executive officer of Scouts Canada in May 2023.

Political offices
Preceded by Aaron Porter (2010–2011)	President of the National Union of Students; 2011–2013	Succeeded by Toni Pearce (2013–2015)
