= Welsh Labour Students =

Student wing of Welsh Labour

Welsh Labour Students Llafur Myfyrwyr Cymru
- Chairperson: Joseph Morden
- Founded: 2007
- Mother party: Welsh Labour, Labour Party (UK)

Welsh Labour Students (Welsh: Llafur Myfyrwyr Cymru) is an independent student organisation that is the official student wing and a registered socialist society of Welsh Labour, and the Welsh wing of Labour Students.

Welsh Labour Students aim to bring Labour values to campuses and represent students within the Labour Party across Wales. WLS hold regular events namely its Annual Conference in November, which is usually held in the city of one of its "constituent clubs". In addition, members of Welsh Labour Students are often entitled to attend events in Welsh Labour and Labour Students as delegates to represent their organisation.

The most active clubs within Welsh Labour Students are; Aberystwyth Labour Students, Cardiff Labour Students, Bangor Labour Students and Swansea Labour Students.

== History ==
The organisation was founded more recently than their Scottish sister organisation Scottish Labour Students but has existed in some form or another for well over a decade. The most recent incarnation of Welsh Labour Students was officially founded in 2007 by the chair at the time, Luke Young. In 2012 reform to Labour Students meant that the Chair of Welsh Labour Students replaced the Wales Co-Ordinator on Labour Students National Committee, solidifying the position of Welsh Labour Students in National Labour Students' structures.

== Internal organisation ==
Whilst membership of Welsh Labour Students only requires membership of the Labour Party at a further or higher education institution in Wales, becoming a committee member requires be a member at a "constituent club" of Welsh Labour Students. Those currently consist of: Aberystwyth Labour Students, Bangor Labour Club, Cardiff Labour Students and Swansea Labour Students.

Welsh Labour Students has a committee made up of 14 people. All positions are elected at the annual Welsh Labour Students Conference held in November.

== Campaigning ==
Welsh Labour Students members are involved in election campaigning in Wales and across the UK, and the organisation mobilises its members to take part in campaigns in marginal seats across the country.

In addition to this, for the first time in 2017 Welsh Labour Students ran its own issue-based priority campaign on access to Trans healthcare in Wales in memory of Welsh Labour Students committee member and trans activist Lily Summers. It criticised the current provisions for trans healthcare in Wales and pushed policy through Welsh Labour Conference in February 2017.

The motion to Welsh Labour Conference passed unanimously and was adopted by the executive committee of Welsh Labour. On 25 August 2017, the Welsh Government announced the creation of a new trans healthcare service in Wales and the establishment of a Gender Identity Clinic in Cardiff, both aims of the motion passed by Welsh Labour Students earlier that year.
