= Gwyn Morgan (civil servant) =

British civil servant (1934–2010)

John Gwynfryn Morgan OBE (16 February 1934 – 21 April 2010) was a British Labour Party official and EU civil servant.

Morgan was born in Cwmdare, Wales, the son of a coal miner. He attended Aberdare Boys Grammar School before going on to the University College Wales, Aberystwyth, where he studied Classics. He also played Second XI Championship cricket for Glamorgan. From 1960 to 1962, Morgan was president of the National Union of Students. He was also Secretary General of the International Student Conference, a non-communist competitor of the International Union of Students.

Morgan served as head of the Labour Party's Overseas Department from 1965 to 1969, succeeding David Ennals. He was then assistant general secretary to Harry Nicholas from 1969 to 1972. Morgan was groomed to succeed Nicholas as General Secretary of the Labour Party, but when Nicholas retired the National Executive Committee instead narrowly selected Ron Hayward. The committee was deadlocked for three consecutive ballots, with the left-leaning Hayward finally winning on the casting vote of chairman Tony Benn.

In 1973, Morgan left the British political scene to go and work for the European Commission. Until 1975, he was chief of staff to George Thomson, the European Commissioner for Regional Policy. Morgan later held various EU administrative and diplomatic positions, and helped create the European Development Fund. He was prominent in the "Yes" campaign for the 1975 EEC membership referendum, and was also on the bureau of the Socialist International. In his personal life, Morgan was a director of London Welsh RFC. He was made an Officer of the Order of the British Empire (OBE) in 1999.

== See also ==
- List of presidents of the National Union of Students

Party political offices
Preceded by David Ennals	Secretary of the International Department of the Labour Party; 1965–1969	Succeeded by Tom McNally
