= Megan Dunn (NUS president) =

British politician

57th President of the National Union of Students
- In office 1 July 2015 – 30 June 2016
- Preceded by: Toni Pearce
- Succeeded by: Malia Bouattia

Personal details
- Born: 1990 or 1991 (age 35–36)
- Education: University of Aberdeen

Megan Dunn (born 1990 or 1991) is a former president of the UK's National Union of Students who held the post from 2015 to 2016. She had previously been the President of Aberdeen University Students' Association.

Dunn was elected as President of the NUS in April 2015. She sought re-election in April 2016, but was defeated by Malia Bouattia.

Dunn campaigned for the United Kingdom to remain in the European Union in the 2016 referendum, having been appointed to the board of the Britain Stronger in Europe campaign.
