= National Campaign Against Fees and Cuts =

UK student activist organisation

Student Left Network (SLN)
- Founded: February 2010
- Type: Advocacy group
- Purpose: Tuition Fees, Higher education, Further education, Free education
- Region served: United Kingdom
- Method: Civil disobedience, Demonstration, Direct action, Occupations, Research, Student activism
- Website: anticuts.com

The National Campaign Against Fees and Cuts (NCAFC) or Student Left Network is a membership-based organisation of activist students and education workers campaigning against tuition fees, education cuts and privatisation in the United Kingdom.

== History ==
National student campaigns for free education in the UK have always existed; the first organised group was the Campaign for Free Education (CFE), founded in 1995 in opposition to proposals by Labour Students for the NUS to abandon its opposition to the abolition of student grants. CFE was disbanded in 2004 by NUS President Kat Fletcher, and took a year re-emerge as Education Not For Sale which was founded by left-wing anti-capitalist students. In 2009 ENS jointly organised (with Socialist Students and Socialist Workers' Student Society) the first student demonstration for free education in 5 years but with low turnout and a proposal in 2010 by UCL Free Education Society to establish NCAFC, ENS was folded into a newly established the National Campaign Against Fees and Cuts (NCAFC).

The organisation was founded at a convention at University College London in February 2010 on a platform of campaigning for "free, fair and funded public education for all", paid for through the taxation of the rich and big business. NCAFC also has semi-autonomous campaigns in Scotland and Wales. The organisation played a role in the 2010 UK student protests, calling several days of action following the National Union of Students organised demonstration on 10 November. It was estimated that up to 130,000 students took part in the 24 November 2010 day of action across the UK. The organisation also undertakes research into education funding.

=== 2010 UK student protests ===
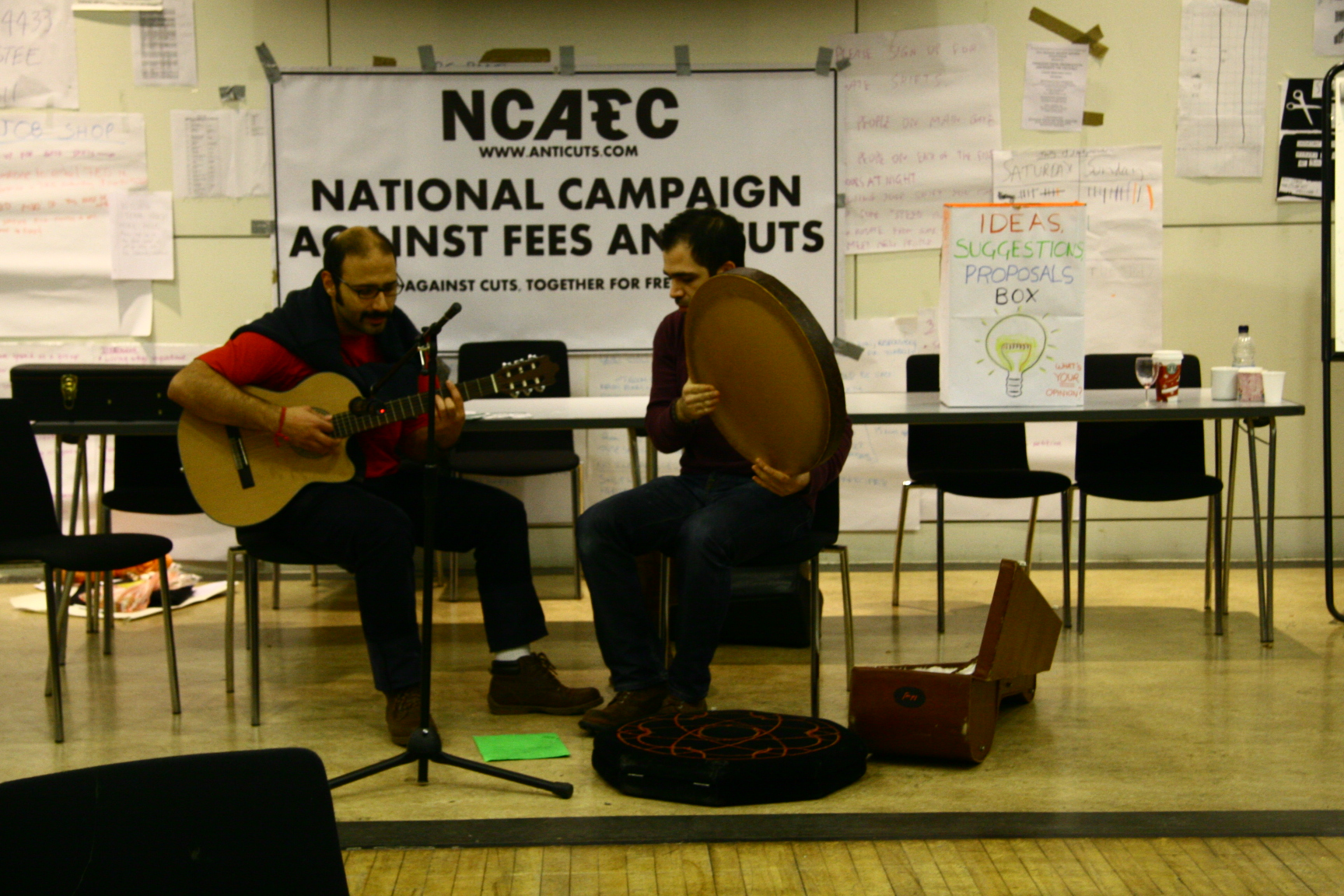
A National Campaign Against Fees and Cuts banner at the occupation of University College London (UCL) on 29 November 2010

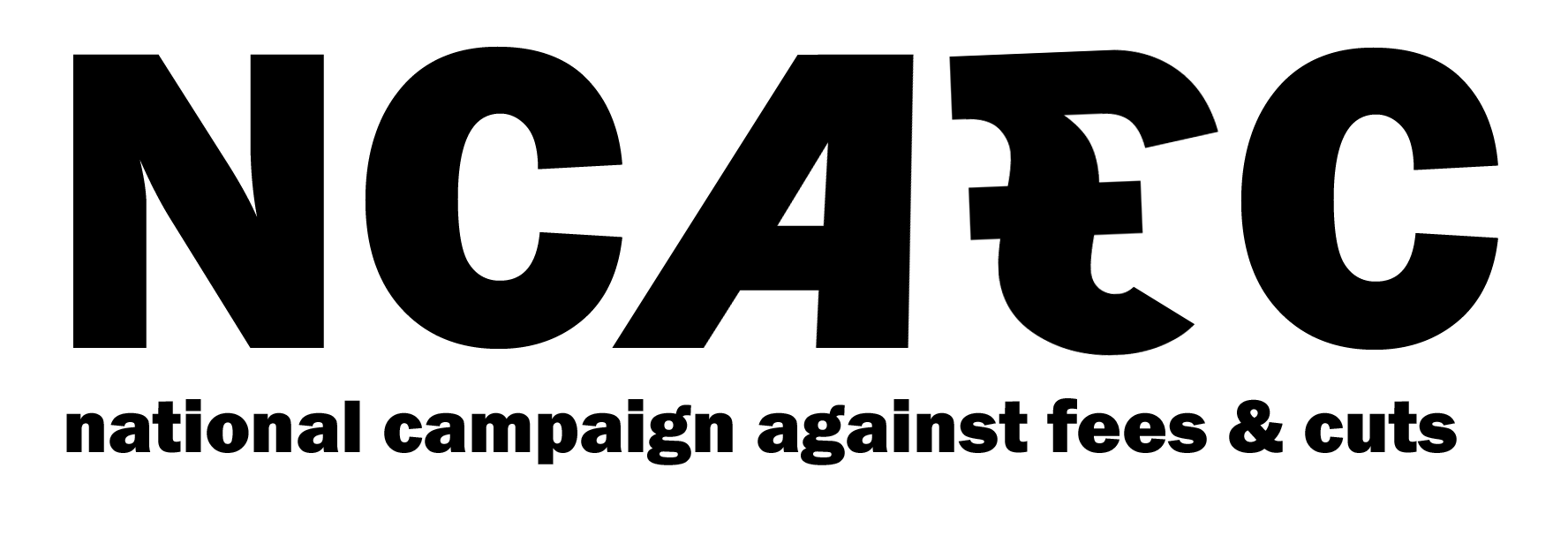
NCAFC logo used until 2018

In 2011 NCAFC organised a march through central London, supported by the National Union of Students and the University and College Union, in opposition to the government's Higher Education White Paper. As many as 15,000 students took part, with the Metropolitan Police pre-authorising the use of plastic bullets in the light of the violence after the previous year's protest against student fees. BBC reporter Mike Sergeant described the policing on the day as "quite extraordinary... It's the most tightly controlled march through London that I have ever seen". The government later withdrew the HE Bill.

In 2014, NCAFC organised another major national demonstration for free education, this time in collaboration with the Student Assembly Against Austerity and the Young Greens. Organisers claimed that the demonstration saw 10,000 students march and that the event was the largest mobilisation of students in Britain since 2010. Following the demonstration, NCAFC organised two separate nationwide days of action for free education, on 3 December 2014 and 31 January 2015. The first gained wide publicity after accusations of police violence at a student occupation at the University of Warwick and the second saw students marching in Brighton, Sheffield and Norwich among other cities.

These marches were followed by a demonstration co-ordinated by NCAFC at the Labour Party Conference in Birmingham in protest at the party's stance on Higher Education funding.

Despite significant gains for left wing candidates at the 2015 National Union of Students conference, candidates standing on the National Campaign Against Fees Cuts slate saw limited success. NCAFC's candidates for president, Beth Redmond, and Vice President Higher Education, Hattie Craig, widely regarded as presenting a 'hard left' face inside NUS in comparison to many of the other left-wing candidates, were not elected into full-time roles. However, NCAFC's candidate for Vice President (Welfare), Shelly Asquith, was elected, and Beth Redmond and Hannah Webb were elected to the NUS Block of 15, meaning the NCAFC have maintained a presence on the NUS National Executive Council as well as maintaining a strong presence in student unions and in autonomous areas of NUS.

In November 2015 the NCAFC organised another national student demonstration in London under the slogan: "No Borders, No Barriers, No Business". The demonstration aimed to connect the fight against cuts to maintenance grants affecting the million poorest students and issues of migration and the refugee crisis. Organisers claimed 10,000 students from across the country joined the protest.

The demonstration was marked by a clash between police and protesters outside the Department for Business, Innovation and Skills when protesters attempted to storm the building. This was followed by what organisers claimed was a use of the controversial kettling containment tactic on Victoria Street, before thousands of students broke police lines and began an unscheduled demonstration through the Victoria area that continued into the evening. 12 demonstrators were arrested over the course of the day.

=== Rebrand ===
In 2018, the organisation relaunched itself as SLN, with a "Student Activist Weekender" in September and a formal rebrand in October. Campaigners spoke about the need to "unite students to campaign collectively against our universities and against the government".

SLN held its inaugural National Conference at the University of Sheffield in February 2019. It voted to break from the dominant 'soft left' Liberation Left faction in NUS due to its position on NUS reforms and on Brexit, and instead campaigned for two left-wing candidates, and actively stood candidates against incumbent officers Zamzam Ibrahim and Eva Crossan-Jory.

== Affiliated organisations ==
- Disabled People Against Cuts
- Edinburgh University Students' Association
- University of Birmingham Guild of Students
- Young Greens of England and Wales
