= Trevor Phillips =

British television broadcaster (born 1953)

Sir Trevor Phillips OBE ARCS FIC
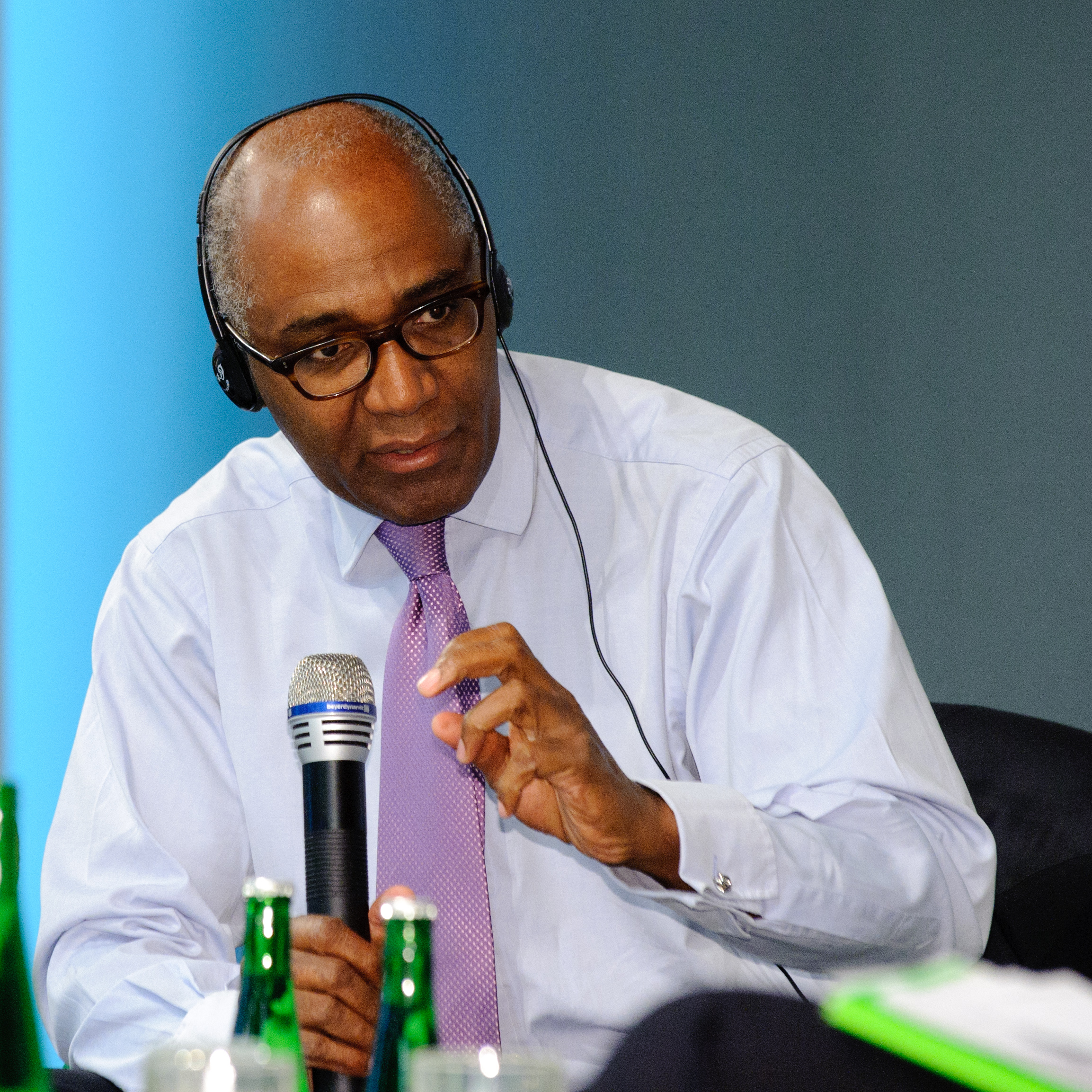
- Phillips in 2010

Chair of the London Assembly
- In office May 2002 – February 2003
- Preceded by: Sally Hamwee
- Succeeded by: Sally Hamwee
- In office 4 May 2000 – May 2001
- Preceded by: Office established
- Succeeded by: Sally Hamwee

Member of the London Assembly as an additional member
- In office 4 May 2000 – February 2003
- Preceded by: New constituency
- Succeeded by: Diana Johnson

President of the National Union of Students
- In office 1978–1980
- Preceded by: Sue Slipman
- Succeeded by: David Aaronovitch

Personal details
- Born: Mark Trevor Phillips; 31 December 1953 (age 72) Islington, London, England
- Party: Labour
- Spouses: Asha Bhownagary (m. 1981; div. 2009) Helen Veale (m. 2013)
- Children: 2
- Relatives: Mike Phillips (brother)
- Education: Imperial College London (BSc)
- Occupation: Politician; broadcaster
- Presenting career
- Show: Sunday Morning with Trevor Phillips
- Network: Sky News
- Time slot: 8:30–10:00 AM Sunday
- Previous show: Sophy Ridge on Sunday (2021–2022; maternity cover)
- Writing career
- Notable work: Windrush: 75 Years of Modern Britain (2023; co-authored with Mike Phillips)

Sir Mark Trevor Phillips OBE ARCS FIC (born 31 December 1953) is a British writer, broadcaster and former politician. He served as Chair of the London Assembly from 2000 to 2001 and from 2002 to 2003. Phillips was appointed head of the Commission for Racial Equality (CRE) by Prime Minister Tony Blair in 2003 and was the chairman of its successor, the Equality and Human Rights Commission (EHRC), from 2007 to 2012.

Phillips presented Trevor Phillips on Sunday, a Sunday morning talk show on Sky News, from 2021 to 2022, and Sunday Morning on Sky News from 2023 to 2026.

Phillips has chaired numerous corporate and social boards. He was the President of the Partnership Council of the John Lewis Partnership from 2015 to 2019.

In 2026, Phillips was hired by CBS News as their Senior Global Affairs Correspondent. He will also contribute occasional stories to their news magazine 60 Minutes.

== Early life and education ==
Mark Trevor Phillips was born in Islington, London, the youngest of ten children. His parents emigrated from British Guiana (now Guyana) in 1950. He spent his childhood partly in British Guiana, and partly in Wood Green, north London; he attended Wood Green County Grammar School, but took his A-levels at Queen's College in Georgetown, Guyana. He returned to England to study at Imperial College London, where he obtained a BSc degree in chemistry in 1975.

== Broadcasting and writing career ==
Phillips worked initially as a researcher for London Weekend Television (LWT), before being promoted to head of current affairs in 1992, remaining in the post until 1994. He produced and presented The London Programme for LWT and has worked on projects for the BBC and Channel 4. With his brother, the crime writer Mike Phillips, he wrote Windrush: The Irresistible Rise of Multi-racial Britain. He has won three Royal Television Society (RTS) awards, including Documentary Series of the Year for Windrush in 1999. He is a Vice President of the RTS.

In March 2015, Channel 4 broadcast Things We Won't Say About Race (That Are True), a feature-length documentary written and presented by Phillips and co-produced by Pepper Productions and Outline Productions. Phillips was invited to analyse and interpret the survey for the documentary What British Muslims Really Think aired April 2016, which followed similar themes to Things We Won't Say About Race (That Are True) relating to exploring racial truths through statistics.

Since 2015, he has been a regular columnist for The Times.

From 2021 to 2022, Phillips covered for Sophy Ridge's Sky News Sunday morning programme Sophy Ridge on Sunday while she was on maternity leave. His programme was temporarily rebranded as Trevor Phillips on Sunday. Sophy Ridge on Sunday aired its final episode in June 2023; Phillips hosted Sunday Morning with Trevor Phillips from 2023 to 2026.

In June 2026, it was announced that CBS News had hired Phillips as a senior global affairs correspondent, based in New York. In July 2026, 60 Minutes executive producer Nick Bilton announced in an employee memo that Phillips would be joining the broadcast as a contributor.

== Political activity ==
As a student at Imperial College London he became president of its students' union, Imperial College Union. In 1978 he was elected president of the National Union of Students as a candidate for the Broad Left.

Phillips was chairman of the Runnymede Trust, a think-tank promoting ethnic equality, from 1993 to 1998, and a commissioner for a number of other charities. He also served as chairman of the London Arts Board. His long-standing friendship with Peter Mandelson, who worked with Phillips at LWT and was best man at his first wedding, brought him close to the New Labour project, and he became friendly with Tony Blair. Phillips joined the Labour Party in London in 1996.

In 1999 Phillips ran to be Labour's candidate in the 2000 election for the first Mayor of London. Phillips was initially Blair's preferred choice for the role. When Blair called for the party to swiftly unite behind one candidate, Ken Livingstone, a left-winger and favourite to win the nomination, offered to form a joint ticket with Phillips as his running mate. Phillips described Livingstone's offer as "patronising" in a response that was seen as an accusation of racism, though Phillips later denied this. Following this and other controversies, including his decision to send his children to a private school, Phillips withdrew from the race a few months later and was not on the final shortlist of candidates. Instead, he accepted an offer to be running mate to Labour's Frank Dobson. Although Dobson won the nomination, his candidature was harmed by the perception that the contest was "fixed" by the use of an electoral college. Livingstone ran as an independent and won. The Labour Party designated Phillips as a member of the London Assembly on 4 May 2000 as one of its "top-up" candidates. Phillips served as chairman of the Assembly until February 2003, resigning his seat to take up his appointment at the Commission for Racial Equality.

In March 2020, Phillips was suspended from Labour following allegations of Islamophobia. Following the suspension, Phillips defended his comments about British Muslims on BBC Radio 4's Today programme. The suspension was lifted in July 2021 after the party's Executive Director of Legal Affairs, Alex Barros-Curtis pursued the resolution of the case.

In 2026, The Daily Telegraph wrote that in recent years Phillips had moved further toward "small-c conservative liberalism".

=== Views on multiculturalism ===
Phillips and Livingstone had a frosty relationship throughout Phillips's time on the London Assembly, and Phillips's opposition to multiculturalism saw them clash time and again during his tenure at the CRE. In a The Times interview in April 2004, Phillips said the government should stop supporting multiculturalism, saying it was out of date and legitimised "separateness" between communities, and instead should "assert a core of Britishness".

In 2006, Livingstone accused Phillips of "pandering to the right" so much that he "would soon join the BNP". Phillips replied that his views had been "well documented" and "well supported". Phillips has made speeches stating that "it was right to ask hard questions about multicultural Britain". Although he apologised for his presentation of research by the Australian academic Michael Poulsen of statistics on levels of segregation, which had led to some controversy, he welcomed the focus on integration of different communities after the launch of A Commission for Integration and Cohesion. Phillips subsequently cited later work by, among others, Professor Eric Kaufmann of Birkbeck College, London University, showing that white and non-white segregation in London and Birmingham increased during the census period to 2011.

After the 2005 riots in France, Phillips warned that "inequality, race and powerlessness" can be "incendiary". He was invited to advise the French government and in September 2007 was made a Chevalier de la Légion d'Honneur.

In 2006 Phillips said that Britain's current approach to multiculturalism could cause Britain to "sleepwalk towards segregation". He expanded on these views in 2016 in a publication by Civitas entitled Race and Faith: the Deafening Silence, in which he said that "squeamishness about addressing diversity and its discontents risks allowing our country to sleepwalk to a catastrophe that will set community against community, endorse sexist aggression, suppress freedom of expression, reverse hard-won civil liberties, and undermine the liberal democracy that has served this country so well for so long." Phillips wrote that "Rome may not yet be in flames, but I think I can smell the smouldering whilst we hum to the music of liberal self-delusion" by ignoring the effects of mass immigration to the United Kingdom, explicitly comparing his warning to Enoch Powell's 1968 "Rivers of Blood" speech.

In 2026, Phillips said "my views on multiculturalism have intensified", noting that "In our society, not all cultures are equally desirable or legitimate" particularly referring to cousin marriage and "societies in which the status of women is inferior".

=== Views on free speech ===
Phillips has spoken on the need for free speech to "allow people to offend each other". These comments came after the protests against the Danish cartoons satirising the Islamic prophet Muhammad, which sparked protests in the Muslim community. He stated in an ITV interview: "One point of Britishness is that people can say what they like about the way we should live, however absurd, however unpopular it is."

While supporting free speech, Phillips has spoken out against providing the far right with a platform. Discussing the Oxford Union's invitation to BNP leader Nick Griffin and Holocaust denier David Irving, he told the BBC's Andrew Marr Show: "As a former president of the National Union of Students, I'm ashamed that this has happened. This is not a question of freedom of speech, this is a juvenile provocation." Griffin has since hit back at Phillips by declaring him a "black racist" in an interview given to Channel 4.

=== Opposition to 42-day detention ===
In early June 2008 Phillips as EHRC head said that he "remain[ed] unpersuaded that the government has yet provided compelling evidence for what our legal advice shows would be an effective suspension of some human rights". Phillips was responding to the growing uproar surrounding proposals to amend counter-terrorism legislation to permit 42 days' detention without charge. He raised the possibility of the EHRC legally testing the legislation by judicial review. In the event, the Brown government maintained the limit on detention without charge at 28 days (although in practice a 14-day limit was observed). Following the installation of a Conservative–Liberal Democrat coalition government, the limit was in January 2011 allowed to revert to 14 days.

=== Views on Islam ===
In 1996 Phillips initiated and sat on the Runnymede Trust's Commission on British Muslims and Islamophobia, whose report Islamophobia: a challenge for us all reviewed the state of anti-Muslim prejudice in the UK. The report helped establish the term "Islamophobia" in UK discourse and it noted that abuse against Muslims was often racialised therefore "a legal term such as ‘religious and racial violence’ is required". It also stated that Islamophobia stemmed from closed views seeing British Muslims as monolithic, separate, and different.

The commission's proposals were in part implemented in UK legislation in the Racial and Religious Hatred Act 2006 and the Equality Act 2010, both of which he influenced as Chair of the EHRC. Phillips later developed his views and in 2016, as part of his Channel 4 documentary What British Muslims Really Think, he said that the commission had correctly recognised the existence of incidents of abuse against British Muslims "but we got almost everything else wrong". Phillips's own analysis for The Sunday Times asserted that the reference to the creation of a "nation within a nation" is not to Muslims as a whole, but to a significant minority and that the documentary acknowledged the diversity among British Muslims.

He went on to say that far from suggesting that Muslims as a group are in some way at fault, he questioned whether the rest of Britain needed to re-examine its own norms and behaviours.

Responses to the documentary were mixed. In The Spectator, political commentator Douglas Murray praised Phillips's ability to "break taboos which too many liberals in the UK are keen to continue enforcing", calling Islamophobia a "fraudulent concept", while his colleague James Delingpole said it was a "brave and honest programme", and the British public knew "large numbers of Muslims don't want to integrate, that their views aren't remotely enlightened". Simon Woolley, founder of Operation Black Vote, said the documentary pandered to prejudice, treated Muslims as a monolithic group and gave "no historical or social/political context". Writing for the Middle East Eye, Peter Oborne said Phillips had employed a double standard to attack social conservatism by comparing British Muslim views against Britain as a whole, rather than against other UK religious groups. In terms of views on homosexuality, religious devotion, and the role of women, Oborne said "Phillips could have carried out a similar poll of Conservative Party activists, of Roman Catholics, of orthodox Jews, or many other religious minorities and come up with something roughly similar."

In August 2017, following the conviction of 17 men and one woman in Newcastle for child sex abuse offences Phillips wrote that the description of the men as simply "Asian" was an injustice to the majority of the UK's Asian population, including many Muslims. A Home Office report subsequently showed child sexual abuse gangs were typically divided on race lines, but more widely that the majority of child sex offenders were made up of white men under the age of 30.

Also in August 2017, Phillips wrote an article for The Sun, based on a report in The Times, about a supposedly Christian girl who had been placed in a non-English-speaking Muslim foster home, which Phillips branded as being "worse than idiotic, and more akin to child abuse," attacking the "pro-Muslim reputation" of the council responsible for the placement. However, IPSO ultimately ruled that The Times' report was rife with inaccuracies about the case, and The Times was forced by IPSO to run the ruling on its front page.

In 2020, Phillips was suspended from the Labour Party pending investigation into Islamophobia based on past statements, a move which he called "Corbynista payback" and "pure political gangsterism". Phillips defended his statements on BBC Radio 4's Today programme, reiterating his view that Muslims should not be treated as a racial group and saying "Muslims are different, and in many ways I think that’s admirable". Asked about his generalisations about British Muslims he said "if you do belong to a group...you identify with a particular set of values, and you stand for it. And frankly you are judged by that". Labour MP Khalid Mahmood defended Phillips saying the "charges are so outlandish as to bring disrepute on all involved in making them", whereas then Labour shadow minister Naz Shah conversely stated that "Some of the things he has said on public record would not be acceptable to any minority community," and Conservative Member of the House of Lords Sayeeda Warsi responded that "Phillips cannot treat Muslims as a homogenised group when it suits him, then later deny they are racialised".

Phillips's suspension from the Labour Party was lifted in June 2021 under the new leadership of the Labour party, though investigations had not concluded. “Trevor Phillips’ case is one of the most high-profile recent examples of Islamophobia within the Labour party and quietly readmitting him behind closed doors, without apology or acknowledgment, will only cause further anxiety and hurt among Muslims”, reacted the Labour Muslim Network.

== Boards and appointments ==
Phillips was the President of the Partnership Council of the John Lewis Partnership from 2015 to 2019 and was the first external appointment for the role since 1928.

He has been the chairman Index on Censorship and a senior fellow at Policy Exchange.

He is chairman of Green Park Interim and Executive Recruitment, director of WebberPhillips, a data analytics provider. He was the cofounder and director of Pepper Productions, an independent television production company, now dormant following the demise of co-founder Charles Armitage. He has been a member of the board of the Barbican Arts Centre, the Council of Aldeburgh Music, and a trustee of the Social Mobility Foundation, among other charities.

=== Equality and Human Rights Commission ===
Phillips became head of the Commission for Racial Equality in 2003, and on its abolition in 2006 was appointed full-time chairman of its successor, the EHRC (initially called the Commission for Equality and Human Rights), which had a broader remit of combating discrimination and promoting equality across other grounds (age, disability, sex, race, religion and belief, sexual orientation and gender reassignment). The EHRC also had the role of promoting and defending human rights, and secured recognition as the national human rights institution for England and Wales (alongside separate commissions in Northern Ireland and Scotland). Phillips's tenure as EHRC chairman (which at his request became a part-time position in 2009) was at times controversial.

Phillips's tenure as EHRC chairman is the longest for any individual in any similar position in the UK. It was said to be dogged by controversies and internal dissent. Under his leadership, six of the body's commissioners departed after expressing concerns about his leadership and probity and others were reported to be considering their position. However, they were replaced and Phillips later completed his term in September 2012.

In 2010 Phillips was investigated regarding alleged attempts to influence a Parliamentary committee (the Joint Committee on Human Rights) writing a report on him. He would have been the first non-politician in over half a century to be convicted of contempt of Parliament, but the Lords Committee found that the allegations were "subjective, and that no firm factual evidence is presented in their support; nor are they borne out by the submissions by individual members of the JCHR." He was cleared of contempt of Parliament and the House of Lords recommended that new and clearer guidance about the conduct of witnesses to Select Committees be issued. However, he was told his behaviour was "inappropriate and ill-advised".

Phillips completed his second term of office in September 2012, which, together with his term at the CRE made him the longest serving leader of any UK equality commission.

== Comparisons between Britain and the United States ==
In an article published in 2003, Phillips stated that "from Rome, through Constantinople to Venice and London, our (European) nations have a history of peacefully absorbing huge, diverse movements of people, driven by war, famine and persecution; and there is no history of long-term ethnic segregation of the kind one can see in any US city".

In a March 2008 article for Prospect magazine, Phillips supported Barack Obama as a potential Presidential candidate, and speculated that if he did become president it might "postpone the arrival of a post-racial America". Following Obama's election, in an interview for The Times on 8 November 2008, Phillips said that he believed it would be impossible for a black candidate in the United Kingdom to rise to the top in politics because of institutional racism within the Labour Party, saying:

If Barack Obama had lived here I would be very surprised if even somebody as brilliant as him would have been able to break through the institutional stranglehold that there is on power within the Labour party.

The comments received support and criticism from members of ethnic communities in the UK.

== Honours ==
Phillips was appointed Officer of the Order of the British Empire (OBE) in the 1999 New Year Honours for services to broadcast journalism.

He received a knighthood in the 2022 New Year Honours in recognition of his services to equality and human rights.

In 2007, he was awarded an Honorary Doctorate by Loughborough University.

== Personal life ==
Phillips married Asha Bhownagary, a Parsi child psychotherapist with Indian ancestry, in 1981 and they had two daughters, one of whom, Sushila, died in April 2021 at age 36 due to anorexia.

In 2013, he re-married to Helen Veale, a TV producer.

He lived in Kentish Town, London, before moving to New York in 2026. His brother is the writer Mike Phillips with whom he has collaborated on writing about the Windrush generation.

Political offices
Preceded by Sue Slipman	President of the National Union of Students; 1978–80	Succeeded by David Aaronovitch
