= Sue Slipman =

Former President of the National Union of Students (UK)

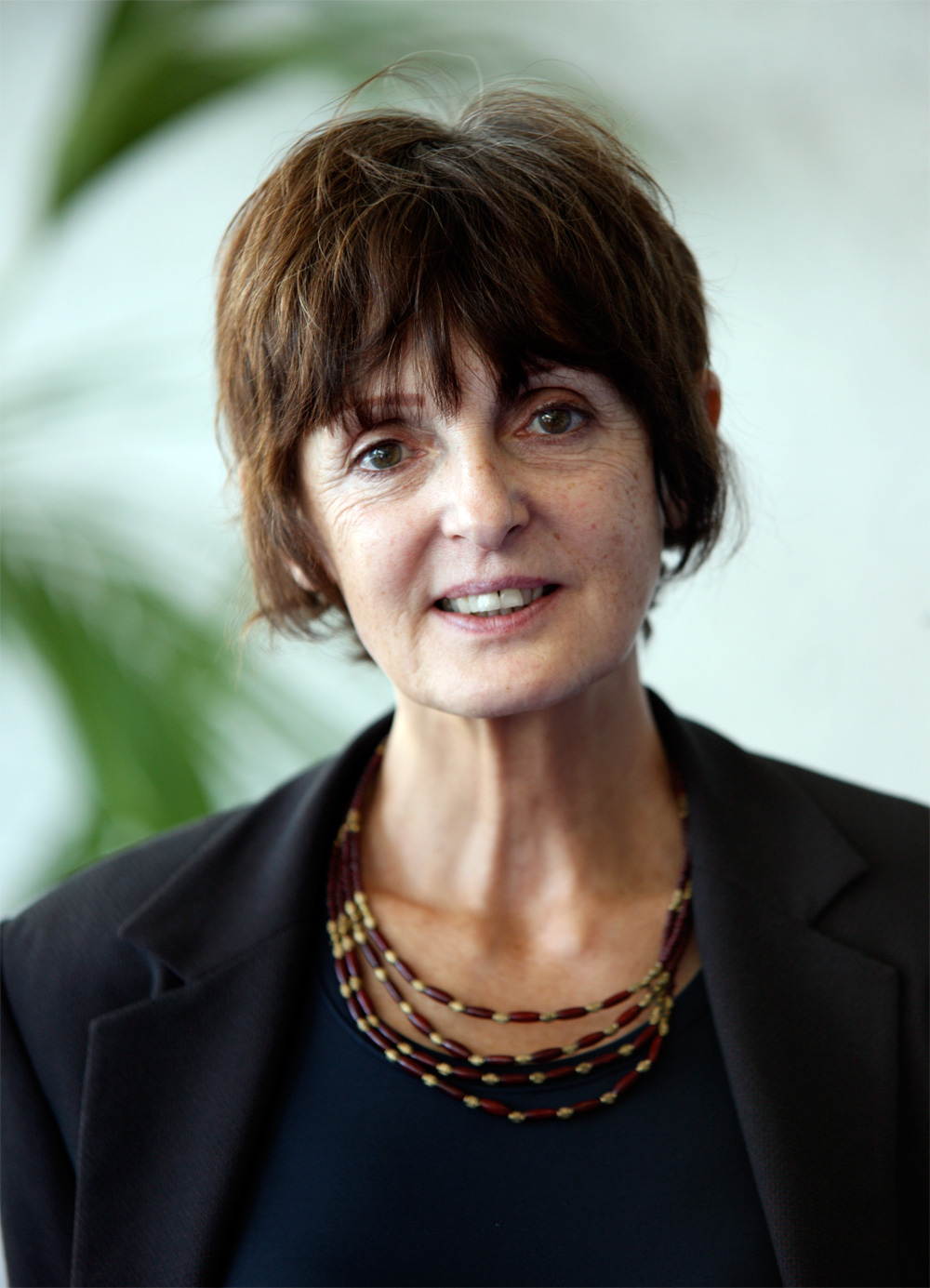
Sue Slipman in 2010

Susan Slipman OBE (born 3 August 1949) was President of the National Union of Students between 1977 and 1978. She later joined the National Union of Public Employees. Since then she has held a wide range of appointments and offices in the public sector and the field of training and education.

== Biography ==
The youngest of three sisters from a close and happy, though often poor, working-class Jewish family and a graduate in English of the University of Wales, Lampeter, Slipman went on to take a postgraduate course at the University of Leeds, from where she was elected NUS vice president in 1974, and a PGCE at the University of London. A member of the Communist Party of Great Britain, she was elected President of the NUS on the Broad Left ticket. She subsequently served as a member of the executive committee of the Communist Party before joining the Social Democratic Party as a founder member in 1981. Supported by David Owen, Slipman stood for the SDP in the working-class constituencies of Basildon in 1983 and Hayes & Harlington in 1987, coming third on both occasions.

In the late 1970s Slipman served as an executive member of the National Council for Civil Liberties. Between 1986 and 1995 she was Director of the National Council for One Parent Families which she rallied in support of the Conservative Government's Child Support Agency. Slipman went on to run the London TEC Council (the co-ordinating organisation for the Training and Enterprise Councils in London. From 1992 she was a member of the Working Group on Women's Issues to the Secretary of State for Employment. She has also written a number of books aimed at improving the situation of women, and single parents, in the workplace.

In 1994 Slipman received an honorary degree of Doctor of Arts from Oxford Brookes University. She was awarded an OBE in the 1994 New Year Honours.

In 1998, Slipman became Director of Environmental and Social Responsibility for the National Lottery operators, Camelot Group, where she stayed until 2003. She then moved to become Chairman of the UK's Financial Ombudsman Service. In 2005 she became a director of the Foundation Trust Network, working with foundation hospitals within the NHS.

Political offices
Preceded by Charles Clarke	President of the National Union of Students; 1977-78	Succeeded by Trevor Phillips
