= Zamzam Ibrahim =

President of the National Union of Students

Vice President of the European Students' Union
- In office 2021

60th President of the National Union of Students
- In office 3 July 2019 – 30 June 2020
- Preceded by: Shakira Martin
- Succeeded by: Larissa Kennedy

Vice President for Society & Citizenship of the NUS
- In office 3 July 2018 – 1 July 2019
- Preceded by: Rob Young
- Succeeded by: Position abolished

Personal details
- Born: 5 June 1994 (age 32) Sweden
- Education: University of Salford; School of Oriental and African Studies
- Occupation: Climate activist

Zamzam Ibrahim is a student politician who was the President of the UK National Union of Students (NUS) from 2019 to 2020. She is also a founding trustee of Students Organising for Sustainability.

== Career in student politics ==
Prior to her presidency of the NUS, Ibrahim was formerly the NUS Vice President of Society & Citizenship. This followed her term as Salford Students' Union President 2017-2018 and vice-president of Business and Law 2015–2016. Before she was a full-time officer at NUS, she served on the National Executive Committee for two years.

Succeeding Shakira Martin, Ibrahim took office as President of the National Union of Students on 1 July 2019. During her term as president, she has headed up multiple campaigns including the drive to get young people registered to vote in the 2019 General Election, the campaign for a National Education Service and leading the Teach the Future Campaign. Ibrahim was succeeded by Larissa Kennedy in July 2020.

== Post-NUS ==
Following her presidency of the NUS, Ibrahim served as vice-president of the European students union in 2021.

Ibrahim also co-founded Students Organising for Sustainability (SOS-UK), an educational charity with a focus on climate activism. As part of the charity, Ibrahim was a contributor to the Climate Education Bill.

In 2025, Ibrahim returned to education, undertaking a Master of Science degree in Migration, Mobility and Development at the School of Oriental and African Studies. She is a recipient of a scholarship from The Aziz Foundation.

== Personal life ==
Zamzam was born in Sweden in 1994 and is Somali, but moved to Greater Manchester at an early age. Ibrahim describes her background as a "daughter of refugees".
