= Trevor Fisk =

British student union leader (1943-1993)

Trevor Fisk (8 May 1943 – 14 March 1993) was a British student union leader, and an executive at British Steel Corporation who was later involved in the field of healthcare marketing in the United States.

Fisk was elected President of the London School of Economics Student Union in 1964, then attended the Inns of Court. He was elected as President of the National Union of Students (NUS) in 1968, as a moderate candidate, defeating the then-radical Jack Straw. During his term in office, he toured South Africa, where he supported British academics taking up posts in white-only universities. He launched a campaign for the reform of British universities, but attracted criticism for asking students not to attend protests against the Vietnam War, and opposed removing a "no politics" clause from the NUS constitution. In 1969 he became the only incumbent President of the NUS to have lost a bid for re-election until Megan Dunn in 2016.

After leaving student politics, Fisk worked as an assistant to the General Secretary of the National Union of Teachers. By 1972 he had joined the British Steel Corporation and entered local politics as a Labour Party councillor in Hounslow. Having contributed to the Young Fabians' pamphlet Students today whilst President of the NUS, in December 1972 he co-authored a Fabian tract on regional development with Ken Jones, a manager at the British Steel Corporation.

Fisk emigrated with his family to the United States in 1978, where he was an innovator in the field of healthcare marketing. He first worked for Cooper Medical Center in Camden, New Jersey and then for Thomas Jefferson University Hospital in Philadelphia. He was also an adjunct lecturer at the University of Pennsylvania on Health Care Marketing. He died suddenly on 14 March 1993 while on a business trip in Orlando, Florida.
