= Clause Four Group =

British student politics group

Clause Four was a group in British student politics in the 1970s and 1980s, set up to oppose Militant in the National Organisation of Labour Students (NOLS).

It backed the Tribune group of Labour MPs, working in the mainstream of the Labour Party, and had a range of views on the democratic socialist left of the Labour Party. It supported the Alternative Economic Strategy, the liberation movements in Southern Africa and Palestine, and deepening equality in society on grounds of sex, race and sexual orientation. Andrew Marr wrote in 1987 that Clause Four members "made hostility to Trotskyism their hallmark".

Clause Four won the National Organisation of Labour Students from Militant in December 1975, turned NOLS towards the mainstream in the student movement, and had a presence in the Labour Party Young Socialists.

People who were involved in Clause Four include Labour MPs Fraser Kemp, Mike Gapes, Alan Whitehead, John Mann, John Denham, Mark Lazarowicz and Margaret Curran, and MSPs Johann Lamont and Sarah Boyack.

Many of those involved in Clause Four subsequently became active in the Labour Co-ordinating Committee. Clause Four was wound up at a special meeting in London in 1991 and its remaining funds donated to Tribune and the Labour Party.
