= Digby Jacks =

British trade unionist (1945–2011)

Digby Jacks (16 May 1945 – 21 October 2011) was a British student activist and trade union official. Jacks became the President of the UK's National Union of Students in 1971, serving until 1973, and was subsequently an official for the Manufacturing, Science and Finance trade union.

Jacks was raised in Charlton, south London, the son of a building surveyor, and read biology at King's College, London, and gained a teaching diploma at the Institute of Education. He taught for a time at Holland Park Comprehensive School before his election to the NUS Executive in 1969.

A member of the Communist Party of Great Britain when elected NUS President, Jacks was the second candidate from the left, in this case the Radical Student Alliance, succeeding Jack Straw, also elected on the RSA ticket, to win since the beginning of the Cold War: national student politics having previously been dominated by an anti-Communist alliance. Proposals from Margaret Thatcher, then Education Secretary in the Heath government, which would have affected the union's autonomy and finances, were dropped after Jacks led a successful campaign mixing protest and argument.

After his term as NUS President, he wrote Student Politics and Higher Education (ISBN 0853153264), a book which examines the broad left's political strategy in student politics. Retiring as a regional officer for the Amicus trade union in 2005, he was a Labour councillor in the London Borough of Hounslow until 2006 and secretary of the lobbying group Alliance for Finance.

Digby Jacks died in October 2011.
