= Neil Stewart (British politician) =

Neil Stewart (born c.1956) is the former chief of staff to Neil Kinnock as leader of the British Labour Party and was President of the National Union of Students Scotland from 1981 to 1982 and President of National Union of Students (United Kingdom) between 1982 and 1984.

Stewart is a graduate of the University of Aberdeen and Aberdeen College of Commerce. He was a member of the Labour party.
