= Broad Left =

The Broad Left was a political faction within the National Union of Students of the United Kingdom (NUS) during the 1970s. It consisted of a working relationship between the Labour Party, the Liberal Party, Plaid Cymru, the Communist Party of Great Britain (CPGB), and other, non-aligned, supporters in order to work as a single voting bloc against the Conservative and some Trotskyist student groups. It held the union presidency and dominated the NUS Executive from 1973, until losing control of the Executive to the National Organisation of Labour Students in 1982.

The Broad Left movement should not be confused with the Student Broad Left movement, a later NUS faction.

== Notable members ==
Those elected to the NUS executive on the Broad Left ticket include the following:

- David Aaronovitch (CPGB; NUS President, 1980–82)
- Charles Clarke (Labour; NUS President, 1975–77)
- Trevor Phillips (Non-aligned Broad Left; NUS President, 1978–1980)
- Sue Slipman (CPGB; NUS President, 1977–78)
- Jack Straw (NUS President, 1969–1971)
