= Malia Bouattia =

British student politician (born 1987)

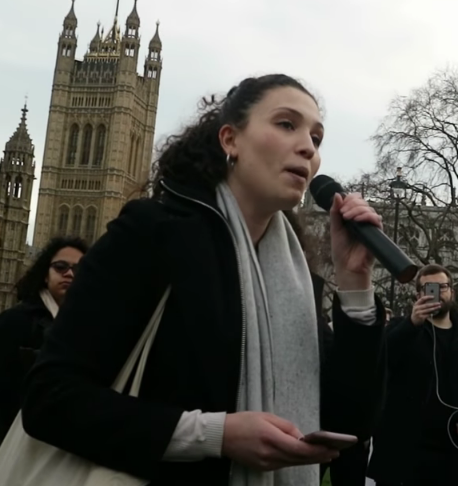
- Bouattia speaking at a Stop Trump rally in Westminster in February 2017

58th President of the National Union of Students
- In office 1 July 2016 – 3 July 2017
- Preceded by: Megan Dunn
- Succeeded by: Shakira Martin

Personal details
- Born: Malia Mazia Bouattia; 22 October 1987 (age 39) Norwich, Norfolk, England
- Education: University of Birmingham

Malia Mazia Bouattia (born 22 October 1987) is the former president of the National Union of Students (NUS) of the United Kingdom, elected at the National Conference in April 2016. She was the first female Black British and Muslim leader of the NUS. She attended the University of Birmingham. In March 2017, she was defeated in her attempt to run for a second term in office by NUS Vice-president Shakira Martin.

Bouattia is a contributor to several news outlets, including The Guardian, Middle East Eye, The New Arab and the HuffPost. She is currently a presenter on the British Muslim TV panel show Women Like Us.

== Early life ==
Bouattia was born in Norwich, Norfolk, in October 1987. Her father is an Algerian academic who now works for an international management consultancy. She has two younger sisters.

The family fled their home in Constantine during the Algerian Civil War, and moved to Birmingham in England, where Bouattia attended school. While at school, she began campaigning on social issues, and took part in protests opposing the Iraq War. Bouattia attended the University of Birmingham where she read cultural studies with French, followed by an MPhil in post-colonial theory. While studying for her MPhil, she began to be active in the NUS. In 2015 she talked about her early life in a speech titled "Against All Odds" at a MADE (Muslim Agency for Development Education) event.

== NUS career ==
=== NUS Black Students' officership and racial identity ===
Bouattia served two years as Black Students' Officer of the National Union of Students (NUS). While in this position, she campaigned against the UK government's Prevent strategy which she describes as "toxic and unworkable". Bouattia also pushed for greater ethnic diversity amongst NUS candidates and campaigned for the establishment of a permanent officer for transgender students.

While a member of the NUS Executive Committee, Bouattia opposed a motion condemning the terrorist acts of ISIS as she considered the wording of the motion Islamophobic. She later supported a second motion condemning crimes by ISIS, as well as Islamophobia in general.

Bouattia has spoken extensively about her North African (Algerian) ancestry and her racial identity as a black woman. Anandi Ramamurthy and Kalpana Wilson have contextualized Bouattia's views as belonging to a tradition of "political blackness" intended to unite anti-racist and anti-colonial movements which had been widely accepted in the 20th century, although this had declined since. They argued that Bouattia's awareness of the simultaneous struggle against racism among immigrants to the UK in the post-war period and movements against colonialism internationally provided a framework to understand opposition to Islamophobia and racism domestically as part of an international movement, and stressed that it was not "an attempt to homogenise identity and experience". In an article she wrote in 2015, Bouattia mentioned the British Black Panthers, the Organisation of Women of African and Asian Descent, the Southall Black Sisters and the United Black Youth League as organisations working in this tradition.

In May 2016, Charlie Brinkhurst-Cuff in the New Statesman argued that Bouattia was not black, noting that her self-identification as black was based on the concept of "political blackness", which Brinkhurst-Cuff defined as part of a tendency by some people of colour to adopt "blackness" as an inclusive term for nonwhites generally. Whilst acknowledging the value of Bouattia's anti-racist work, and the relevance of political blackness as a historical term, Brinkhurst-Cuff suggested that this conflation of the variety of racialised experiences was "unwise and outdated". Brinkhurst-Cuff nonetheless welcomed Bouattia's appointment, and distinguished her case from that of Rachel Dolezal on the grounds that Bouattia was a woman of colour who was honest about her ancestry.

=== Election as NUS president ===
At the 2016 NUS conference Bouattia ran for the position of president against incumbent Megan Dunn with a campaign slogan of "For a strong transformative union". She opposed Dunn's plans to end the NUS' relationship with the human rights organisation CAGE, which Bouattia had defended in July 2015 against David Cameron's accusation that it is an "extremist" group. Bouattia has referred to the stance against CAGE as consisting of "baseless Islamophobic smears", while Dunn described its leaders as having "sympathised with violent extremism and violence against women."

Bouattia won the 2016 election with 50.9% of the vote, pledging to oppose government cuts to bursaries and the NHS. Bouattia stated that she would place greater emphasis on global politics.

=== Allegations of antisemitism ===
During her campaign attention was drawn to past comments she had made, that were criticised as antisemitic. In a co-written 2011 University of Birmingham Friends of Palestine blog post, she described the university as "something of a Zionist outpost in British Higher Education" which has "the largest JSoc [Jewish student society] in the country whose leadership is dominated by Zionist activists". For this she has been condemned by over 300 Jewish student leaders, the Union of Jewish Students and Oxford University Student Union.

In her response to this criticism in April 2016, Bouattia rejected the accusation that she had a problem with Jewish societies on-campus. Daniel Clements, then president of Birmingham J-Soc, found her comments "completely unsatisfactory".

Bouattia said her comments had been misrepresented and "that for me to take issue with Zionist politics is not me taking issue with being Jewish." An October 2016 report by the House of Commons Home Affairs Select Committee, described her comments as "outright racism" and said that she was not taking issues of antisemitism on university campuses seriously enough. A letter published in The Independent with signatories including Professor Norman Finkelstein and Professor Moshé Machover, supported Bouattia's record of fighting racism and antisemitism.

In an opinion piece for The Jewish Chronicle, Maajid Nawaz quoted from a speech by Bouattia at a conference on "Gaza and the Palestinian Revolution" in 2014, in which she said: "With mainstream Zionist-led media outlets ... resistance is presented as an act of terrorism". Any peace talks, in her opinion, are a "strengthening of the colonial project". Bouattia attracted criticism for appearing to suggest that non-violent resistance to Israeli occupation is a limited option.

In January 2017, an Al Jazeera investigation found that the Union of Jewish Students (UJS) had received money from the Israeli embassy, had attempted to influence the NUS presidency election, and had worked to remove Bouattia once she was elected.

The following month, an internal NUS inquiry concluded that Bouattia had made an antisemitic statement, although four other such claims were rejected. As she had expressed regret, the investigator said that Bouattia should not face any action so long as she apologised.

=== Students' union disaffiliations ===
In response to her election, students at Durham, Loughborough, Hull, Aberystwyth, Oxford, Cambridge, Manchester, Essex, York, King's College London, Nottingham, Leicester, Queen Mary University of London and Reading University began campaigning to disaffiliate from the NUS.

On 9 May 2016 the University of Lincoln disaffiliated from the NUS. Within the same week, Newcastle University followed. Hull University disaffiliated on 24 May 2016, followed by Loughborough University on 7 June. Queen Mary, Nottingham, Oxford, Surrey, Exeter, Warwick, Cambridge and Durham universities voted to remain affiliated to the NUS.

=== Defeat in 2017 NUS election ===
On 13 March 2017, Bouattia announced that she was running for a second term as NUS President. The NUS Vice-president for further education Shakira Martin ran against her, as well as Durham student Tom Harwood, who stood on a conservative platform and lampooned the NUS and Bouattia's "irrelevant grandstanding" in his somewhat satirical campaign literature. Martin defeated Bouattia, winning 56% of the vote in the election at the national conference in Brighton the following month. She gained 402 of the 721 votes cast by delegates, while Bouattia received 272 and Harwood 35.
