= National Union of Students Wales =

Welsh branch of NUS

National Union of Students Wales (NUS Wales)
- President: Orla Tarn
- Founded: 1974, NUS UK founded 1922
- Headquarters: 2nd Floor, Cambrian Buildings, Mount Stuart Square, Cardiff Bay, CF10 5FL.
- International affiliation: European Students' Union

National Union of Students Wales (NUS Wales; Welsh: Undeb Cenedlaethol y Myfyrwyr Cymru, UCMC) is the Welsh section of the National Union of Students of the United Kingdom. NUS Wales, alongside its constituent students' unions represents students in higher and further education in Wales. With over a quarter of a million student members it is the largest democratic organisation in Wales.

== Founding of NUS Wales ==
On the 3–4 November 1973 a meeting of the “National Welsh Colleges Conference” was held in Aberystwyth. The conference was a mixture of briefings, workshops and policy discussion. Delegates agreed to draft a new constitution establishing a greater level of autonomy to be presented to NUS Conference in 1974. NUS Wales was established as a result of this in 1974.

== Structure ==
NUS Wales is a constituent organisation of NUS UK, that sets its own independent policies. It is run by an executive committee elected at its conference meetings. NUS Wales does not have full financial independence from the rest of the NUS, as its budget is decided at the NUS annual conference. The organisation has three sabbatical officers: a President, Vice President and Women's Officer.

== Political activity ==
NUS Wales campaigned for devolution in Wales, supporting the Yes campaign during the 1997 Welsh referendum on the creation of a separate assembly for Wales. During the 2015 general election NUS Wales encouraged students in marginal constituencies to vote, through organising debates and hosting street parties near polling stations.
