= National Union of Students–Union of Students in Ireland =

National Union of Students-Union of Students in Ireland (NUS-USI)
- Founded: 1972
- Headquarters: Belfast, Northern Ireland
- International affiliation: European Students' Union
- Website: NUS-USI.org

NUS-USI, the student movement in Northern Ireland, was formed in 1972 by bilateral agreement between the National Union of Students of the United Kingdom (NUS) and Aontas na Mac Léinn in Éirinn (AMLÉ, formerly USI, the Union of Students in Ireland) to address the particular problems of representing students in Northern Ireland. As of 2018, NUS-USI represented approximately 200,000 students in the region.

Students at an affiliated college are members of both national students' unions. The elected leader of the organisation is a full-time representative, elected as a sabbatical from one of the member colleges. An elected term is normally two years long (July–June). An officer within the executive of the movement may hold an officer position for a maximum of two terms.

The operations of the NUS-USI are overseen by its president, officers and board. A number of part-time student officers also fill the roles of further education officer, campaigns and communications officer, welfare officer, and international students' officer. Autonomous liberation campaigns also elect part-time officers who fill the roles of disabled students officer, women's officer, LGBT+ officer, trans students' officer and BAEM (black, Asian and ethnic minority) officer.

== History ==
Following the model of Scottish Universities, a Students' Representative Council (SRC) was formally established at Queen's College Belfast in 1897. Student representatives from Queen's University subsequently played roles in founding the National Union of Students in 1922 and the Irish Students Association, which stimulated the formation of the Union of Students in Ireland (later known as Aontas na Mac Léinn in Éirinn) in 1959.

Increasing student activism in the late 1960s led to a moving away from a model of Student Representative Councils (SRCs) as a system of governance towards the creation of students' unions and more participatory "general meetings", accessible to all students. Students' unions also took on a more campaigning role, and Northern Irish student activists such as Michael Farrell, Eamonn McCann and Bernadette Devlin (now McAliskey) led campaigns for "civil rights" in Northern Ireland. During this period, students' unions in Northern Ireland separately affiliated to each national union, depending to a large extent on the religious/political disposition of their members.

NUS-USI was involved in the Student Housing Association Co-op (SHAC) which was founded by Ray Cashell in 1977.

Together with local students' unions, NUS-USI now provides a range of services, including campaigns on education, welfare and citizenship, as well as infrastructure and support for the individual students' unions. NUS-USI celebrated its 40th anniversary in 2012.

At its annual conference held in Derry in March 2018, NUS-USI introduced two new part-time student officer roles in the form of an international students' officer and a trans students' officer.
