= Socialist Workers' Student Society =

Student section of the Socialist Workers Party of Britain

The Socialist Worker Student Society (SWSS, pronounced swizz) is the student section of the Socialist Workers Party in Britain.

In the 1950s and 60s, student members of the SWP's forerunners were active in the National Association of Labour Student Organisations (NALSO) in line with the group's policy of membership in the Labour Party. In the early 1960s, a leading member of the International Socialists, as the SWP was known prior to 1977, became editor of Clarion, the NALSO publication. Having departed the Labour Party, IS students were active in college based socialist societies and then in the Revolutionary Socialist Student Federation. When that body collapsed, they operated as the National Organisation of International Socialists Students (NOISS) and from 1977 onwards as the Socialist Worker Student Organisation (SWSO). The name was changed to SWSS in the early 1980s.

SWSS have organised demonstrations and protests on campus, often in collaboration with other campaign groups.

In 2013, as the 'Comrade Delta' scandal developed, allegations of rape made against a former senior official of the SWP, the Leeds SWSS branch was among those who strongly criticised the situation in the party. The SWP's student membership has suffered a serious decline. As a result, there have been attempts in 2014 to ban the Socialist Worker Student Society at the University of Edinburgh, University of Sussex and Goldsmiths, University of London.
