= National Union of Students (United Kingdom) =

National students' union in the United Kingdom

- Abbreviation: NUS
- Formation: 10 February 1922; 104 years ago
- Headquarters: London, England, UK
- Services: support to students and students' unions
- Members: ~600 students' unions
- Official language: English, Welsh (NUS Wales)
- President: Amira Campbell
- Subsidiaries: NUS Services Limited, NUS Holdings Limited, NUS Students' Union Charitable Services, NUS Media Limited
- Affiliations: European Students' Union
- Website: www.nus.org.uk

The National Union of Students (NUS) is a confederation of student unions across the United Kingdom. Approximately 600 student unions are affiliated, accounting for more than 95% of all higher and further education unions in the UK. Although the National Union of Students is the central organization for all affiliated unions in the UK, there are also the devolved national sub-bodies: NUS Scotland in Scotland, NUS Wales (UCM Cymru) in Wales and NUS-USI in Northern Ireland (the latter being jointly administered by Aontas na Mac Léinn in Éirinn).

NUS is a member of the European Students' Union.

== Membership ==
There are four types of membership of NUS:

- Constituent membership is granted to students' unions by National Conference or National Executive Council by a two-thirds majority vote
- Individual membership is granted automatically to members of students' unions with constituent membership, sabbatical officers of constituent members, members of the National Executive Council and sabbatical conveners of NUS Areas
- Associate membership is granted by a two-thirds majority vote of National Executive Council to:
  - Student Organisations in Association – any national student organisations
  - Partner Organisations in Association - non-student organisations which sympathise with the NUS
  - Individuals in Association – any individual who supports the objects of the NUS
  - NUS Areas - geographically defined associations of students' unions
- Honorary membership is granted by National Conference to "any person or organisation as it sees fit"

Of these types of membership, only constituent members may vote on or submit policy proposals to the National Conference. Constituent members and associate members are required to pay a subscription fee as a condition of their membership.

== History ==
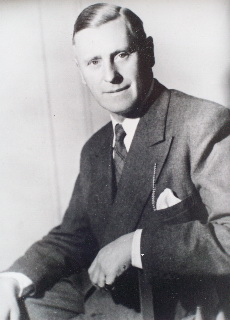
Sir Ivison Macadam was the founding president of the NUS. He was later the first Director-General of the Royal Institute of International Affairs.

=== Origins and early history ===
The NUS was formed on 10 February 1922 at a meeting held at the University of London. At this meeting, the Inter-Varsity Association and the International Students Bureau (which organised student travel and had been lobbying for a national body) agreed to merge.

Founding members included the unions of University of Birmingham, Birkbeck, University of London, London School of Economics, Imperial College (who first left in 1923 and have subsequently rejoined and left three times, the last time being in June 2008), King's College London (who supplied the first President, Sir Ivison Macadam) and the University of Bristol.

=== Politicisation and Broad Left, 1968–1982 ===
In the aftermath of the First World War in its founding constitution, the National Union of Students had adopted from the outset a "non political" clause in its charter in an attempt to distance itself from the reasons that the War had broken out. It had thus concerned itself with student interaction and cheap travel, student grants and student interests.

This apolitical consensus was challenged in concert with the international protests of 1968 and as the Cold War intensified. At the 1969 NUS conference, then president Trevor Fisk came up against Jack Straw (then close to Bert Ramelson of the Communist Party of Great Britain, but much later Foreign Secretary under the New Labour government of Tony Blair) over the issue. Straw supported student protests against US military involvement in the Vietnam War, while Fisk advocated neutrality; Straw's side won and the "no politics" clause was removed.

A new era began for the NUS, where political agitation and protest became institutionalized. Straw was followed up as president by Digby Jacks, also representing the Radical Student Alliance (formed in 1966 by Fergus Nicholson) and a member of the Communist Party of Great Britain. According to contemporary British government reports, the RSA was connected to the Trotskyist-led Vietnam Solidarity Campaign and had close links with the Sozialistischer Deutscher Studentenbund (organising a protest following Rudi Dutschke's shooting). The government report stated "If they have an ideological bible it consists of the work of Professor Herbert Marcuse, One-Dimensional Man." In line with the Marcusian viewpoint of championing politicised minority groups, throughout the 1970s, the NUS came to support what it called "liberation campaigns", including; homosexual rights (the first national group to do so in 1973), radical feminism and black nationalism. At the same time, the NUS adopted a No Platform policy; a concept pioneered by the IMG in 1972; to stifle the campus organisation and speech of nationalistic British groups that it declared to be "racist or fascist". At the time, this was aimed at the National Front and the Monday Club (a faction in the Federation of Conservative Students).

The union was also involved in affairs in Northern Ireland, where most higher education establishments there were members of both the NUS and Aontas na Mac Léinn in Éirinn (AMLÉ), though this differed from case to case. Indeed, two presidents of the NUS earlier on in the 1960s were from The Queen's University of Belfast (Queen's or QUB); T. William Savage and T. Geoff Martin. The 1968–69 unrest in Northern Ireland saw the onset of The Troubles and a sectarian divisiveness come to the fore. After members of the QUBSU organised a protest against the hardline Unionist politician Bill Craig, the then Minister of Home Affairs, some members such as Bernadette Devlin, Eamonn McCann and Michael Farrell decided to found the Trotskyist group People's Democracy in 1968, which played a role in the Northern Ireland civil rights movement. Following a meeting in Galway in 1972, to combat divisions, it was agreed that a group called the NUS-USI would be founded with dual-membership to cover Northern Ireland.

One of the NUS' protest campaigns which was of particular significance during the 1970s and the 1980s was the boycott campaign against National Party governed South Africa as part of the Anti-Apartheid Movement. In 1970, NUS vice president Tony Klug visited South Africa and met with Steve Biko of the SASO among others. Members also attempted to disrupt South African rugby and cricket matches in the United Kingdom during the 1970s. In the 1980s, the NUS played a significant role in getting Barclay's Bank to divest from South Africa, attacking it as "Boerclay Bank".

Throughout this period, the NUS presidency was dominated by the Broad Left, within which the Communist Party of Great Britain (where Eurocommunism was most popular among students rather than the pro-Soviet "Tankie" anti-revisionists) predominated and usually supplied the president, but were backed up by Labour and the Liberals. They did so to work as a voting bloc against both the Conservatives and Militant. The first of these Broad Left presidents was Charles Clarke (later a Home Secretary under Blair) who as a member of the Clause Four Group, won the National Organisation of Labour Students back from Militant influence. Other presidents included Sue Slipman (who began on the Eurocommunist wing on the Communist Party of Great Britain but ended up a founding member of the Social Democratic Party by 1981), Trevor Phillips (a Broad Left independent and the first black NUS president, who later led the race relations group the Runnymede Trust) and David Aaronovitch (who was then a Eurocommunist, but later became a journalist aligned to neoconservatism).

=== Labour Students presidency, 1982–2000 ===
From 1982 with the election of Neil Stewart, until Andrew Pakes stood down in 2000, the presidency of the National Union of Students was controlled by the National Organisation of Labour Students, which shortened its name to Labour Students in 1994. Notable NUS Presidents of this period included Phil Woolas, Maeve Sherlock and Stephen Twigg.

In 1989, activist, journalist and community activisit Andrea Enisuoh was the first black woman to be elected to the Executive Committee.

=== History in the 21st century ===
==== Fairtrade ====
The Fairtrade NUS Campaign was started by students at the University of Edinburgh in autumn 2005. The campaign, which has now been joined by numerous other students' unions in Britain, is calling for 100% of the hot beverages (tea, coffee, hot chocolate, etc.) sold by member unions of the NUS to be accredited with the Fairtrade Markchart.

The campaign has since been extended into Students Organising for Sustainability (SOS-UK), an educational charity responding to the climate emergency and ecological crisis.

The Fairtrade Foundation collaborated with the NUS in awarding The Fairtrade Universities and Colleges Award, which started as a pilot in 2017. As of 2020, twelve universities had achieved Fairtrade status.

==== Education finance ====
Under the leadership of Wes Streeting the NUS abandoned its long-standing commitment to free education and backed a graduate tax as its preferred outcome of the Browne Review into higher education funding. Before the 2010 General Election, the NUS invited candidates to sign a pledge not to raise tuition fees, receiving over 1000 signatories from prospective parliamentary candidates. This became a very high-profile campaign when many Liberal Democrat MPs, who all signed individual NUS pledges stating they would vote against any rise in tuition fees if elected, had to abstain or do the opposite as part of their coalition agreement.

The NUS, under new leader Aaron Porter, organised a national protest attended by thousands in November 2010, demanding an end to education cuts. The march route passed Whitehall and the Conservative Party headquarters at Millbank Tower. As they marched past the building, some protesters diverted in to the courtyard of Millbank Tower and began an occupation of the building.

With an attendance of over 50,000 people, it was the largest British demonstration since the Iraq War protest. This led to various more demos until the rise in tuition fees was passed.

The day before the vote to allow a rise in tuition fees, the Daily Telegraph reported that they had seen emails that suggested Aaron Porter had supported, rather than increase tuition fees, cuts of up to 80% should be made to student support packages including grants and loans. Porter responded to the claims on NUS Connect that "In all of these meetings and communications we stated our firm and clear opposition to cuts" and that the distortion of the discussions was "political desperation from a coalition government losing the arguments on its own policies".

On 9 April 2014 the National Union of Students passed policy at its national conference to reverse its position on education funding. The call for a graduate tax was abandoned in favour of calls for free education funded through progressive taxation.

==== Governance review ====
NUS logo used until 2013

The 2008 Conference in Blackpool was dominated by the governance review debate and vote. The proposals were for a restructuring of the running of the Union but the vote was lost by 25 votes (a two-thirds majority was required). The review was criticised for what was felt by detractors to be an attack on the organisation's democratic accountability. Its supporters however defended the review as providing a more 'innovative' corporate structure which was hoped to make it more credible in negotiating policy, rather than simply 'reactive'. This was not well received by many in the executive with President, Gemma Tumelty, vowing to press ahead with reform. The perceived lack of progress on governance reform also prompted Imperial College Union to hold a referendum on disaffiliation.

==== ISIS, Malia Bouattia, and disaffiliations ====
In October 2014, NUS National Executive Committee rejected a motion to condemn the militant group Islamic State because some executive members "felt that the wording of the motion being presented would unfairly demonise all Muslims rather than solely the group of people it set out to rightfully condemn." NUS received criticism for this stance given its previous condemnation of the UKIP political party. Despite a statement from NUS confirming that "a new motion will be taken to the next NUS National Executive Committee meeting, which will specifically condemn the politics and methods of ISIS and offer solidarity for the Kurdish people," media coverage of the vote caused some students' union members to speculate that the NUS itself has been infiltrated by extremist sympathisers. At the following executive meeting on 3 December 2014, a similar motion, which condemned ISIS, expressed solidarity with the Kurdish people, and called on NUS to challenge "Islamophobia and all forms of racism being whipped up" was resubmitted and easily passed.

At the 2016 NUS conference, Malia Bouattia was elected president with 50.9% of the vote defeating Megan Dunn who had sought re-election. Bouattia was soon subject to several allegations of antisemitism; an October 2016 report by the House of Commons Home Affairs Select Committee described her comments as "outright racism", and said that she was not taking issues of antisemitism on university campuses seriously enough. Bouattia was condemned by over 300 Jewish student leaders, the Union of Jewish Students and Oxford University Student Union. In response to her election, students at Durham, Loughborough, Hull, Aberystwyth, Oxford, Cambridge, Manchester, Essex, York, King's College London, Nottingham, UWE, Leicester, Queen Mary University of London and Reading University began campaigning to disaffiliate from the NUS. Newcastle, Portsmouth, Hull and Loughbrough disaffiliated; the remainder maintained affiliation, although NUS reportedly broke campaigning rules at Oxford, Cambridge, and Christ Church.

In April 2017, Bouattia was defeated in her re-election by Shakira Martin, the union's vice-president for further education, who received 56% of the vote. Martin pledged "unity", "pragmatism", and putting "NUS back into the hands of its membership". Moderate groups such as the Organised Independents and Union of Jewish Students sought to reform the organisation to prevent further disaffiliations, passing major democratic reform motions. The changes, developed from "two [years] of consultation with hundreds of students' unions, [as well as] legal and expert advice," were described as "the most comprehensive and wide-ranging structural reforms in NUS history".

==== Threat of bankruptcy ====
On 2 November 2018, it was reported that the NUS faced bankruptcy. The 2017 reforms had not been delivered, and several years of financial mismanagement had created a significant decline in resources. Martin wrote to members that the union would be "taking urgent action to stabilise", with reforms being developed for "consideration and refinement with the help of our members". Martin faced criticism for developing a drastic programme of financial, governance and campaigning reforms for approval by the 2019 National Conference; however after around five hours of debate, 700 delegates voted in favour of the package. Martin welcomed the vote, calling it a "momentous decision to endorse reform and deliver the vision of members".

==== New NUS ====
In 2020, NUS official split into two organisations: NUS UK and NUS Charity. NUS UK focuses on campaigning with students while NUS Charity focuses on supporting students' unions.

==== Report into institutional antisemitic behaviour ====
In May 2022, the UK Government announced it would sever all ties with the NUS on the basis claiming that it had failed to tackle “antisemitic rot at the heart". Also in May 2022, NUS announced that Rebecca Tuck QC would lead an independent investigation into allegations of antisemitism within NUS. Following her inquiry, Shaima Dallali was dismissed as NUS President in November 2022.

The independent investigation found that NUS has failed to sufficiently challenge antisemitism and hostility towards Jews in its own structures. Jewish students have been "subjected to harassment" and NUS policies have been breached. The NUS apologised to Jewish students and said it would implement the report's recommendations.

== Democracy ==
The NUS holds national conferences once a year. National Conference is the sovereign body of NUS, and is where NUS policy is decided. Regional Conferences are run to enhance the representation of members from Scotland, Wales, and Northern Ireland. Prior to the 2019 reforms other conferences such as Women's Conference, Lesbian, Gay, Bisexual & Trans Students' Conference (changed as of 2004), Disabled Students' Conference, Black Students' Conference, Mature and Part-Time Students' Conference and the International Students' Conference (created in 2004) were run to enhance the representation of the specific members they included. Post-2019 the Women's, LGBT, Trans, Disabled, and Black Students' Conferences have been merged into a single Liberation Conference and the Mature and Part-Time, Postgraduate, and International Students' Conferences are no longer in operation.

In July 2014, due to the creation of a new NUS London area, the first NUS London conference was held. Most of these conferences, and in particular the elections held at them, are contested by factions including Conservative, Labour Students, the Young Liberals, National Campaign Against Fees and Cuts, the Organised Independents, Young Independence, Socialist Students, Socialist Workers' Student Society, Student RESPECT and Liberation Left. In addition to these political factions, interest groups such as the Federation of Student Islamic Societies and the Union of Jewish Students are deeply involved in the internal democratic processes of the NUS.

== NUS Services ==
NUS Services provides collective purchasing, support and marketing services to NUS-affiliated students' unions. Its shareholders consist of over 200 NUS-affiliated students' unions, and it is directed by a board and committees composed of volunteers from these shareholder unions.

The Association for Managers in Students' Unions voted to merge with NUS and NUS Services in 2010.

=== TOTUM ===
TOTUM, formerly known as NUS Extra, is a discount card which can be purchased by students. It is produced by NUS Services in conjunction with NUS, and affiliated students' unions receive a commission on every card sold to their members, however the card is available to all students regardless of whether they are members of an affiliated student union or not. TOTUM users are also eligible to apply for a NUS PASS-approved identification card.

=== NUS Charitable Services ===
NUS has established a charity to drive improvement in students' unions. It will focus on students' union quality, talent management, equality and diversity, strategic development and turnaround, ethical and environmental work, and fundraising.

Ethical and environmental work

To encourage environmental sustainability, the NUS organises behavioural change programmes among staff and students, such as Green Impact, Student Switch Off, and Student Eats.

NUS's ethical and environmental department originated in 1995, forming a committee tasked with investigating allegations of environmental bad practice at Bass breweries.

In 2016, the department managed the pilot year of NUS Students' Green Fund – a £5 million grant from HEFCE, supporting 25 student-led, transformative sustainability projects at students' unions across England.

In 2019, this department became an independent organisation called Students Organisation for Sustainability UK.

== Criticisms ==
The NUS has come in for criticism from those students' unions who are not affiliated. Sen Ganesh, then president of Imperial College Union, said in 2002 that "NUS's claim to be representative of students is not borne out by their work", especially as "the NUS is dominated by Labour students and this diminishes the ability to address student issues in an impartial fashion".

Another criticism leveled at NUS is the absence of direct democracy in electing national officers. Officers of NUS are elected at conferences by delegates chosen by affiliated unions of NUS. Critics, from both within and outside the student movement, have argued that consultation by unions with their members over who should represent the students' union at national conferences is often minimal, and some have argued in favour of changes to the NUS constitution that would result in a one-member-one-vote policy.

The NUS has also been criticised for prioritisation of NUS Extra over campaigning on issues which affect students.

=== Financial crisis ===
In the mid-2000s, NUS faced a financial crisis, caused by a coinciding of spiraling expenditure and decreasing income. A series of measures were proposed to address this, of which the most controversial included a series of changes to the constitutional and democratic processes. In 2004, two emergency conferences passed some of the changes proposed, albeit not without fierce dispute between those claiming the proposals were necessary reforms to maintain the existence of the organisation and those arguing that they were aimed at curbing democracy and involvement. The 2006 NUS Conference passed a policy which enabled NUS to launch NUS Extra in September 2006.

=== Liar Liar campaign ===
In the run up to the 2015 general election the NUS launched its Liar Liar campaign aimed at unseating members of Parliament (MPs) who broke promises regarding the cost of education. At an estimated cost of £40,000 and consisting of a social media campaign alongside billboards, the campaign was well-received by many students, but also came under criticism for being politically motivated specifically against Liberal Democrat MPs as opposed to members of all parties.

Posters promoting the campaign were also removed from several railway stations on the grounds that Network Rail is an "arms length public sector body" and must therefore remain politically neutral. The NUS claimed that the removal of the posters was an attempt to "gag" the union.

NUS president Toni Pearce defended the union's actions saying that the breach of a promise regarding tuition fees: "Wasn't a minor misdemeanour. It was an outright lie. We have an obligation to hold them to account for this, and we will."

=== Disputes over Palestine ===
In 2024, a controversy emerged surrounding the ousting of former president Shaima Dallali, after the NUS paid out a significant pre-tribunal settlement to her. Dallali was previously ousted in 2022 following an investigation over a social post she made regarding the Israeli–Palestinian conflict 10 years prior that the NUS claimed was anti-semitic. Dallali had previously apologised for the tweet. In a statement following the settlement, the NUS admitted that she should have been permitted to hold "pro-Palestinian and anti-Zionist beliefs."

At the National Conference 2024, several student unions submitted a motion to be presented titled 'Solidarity with the people of Palestine and preserving the student movement'. With disagreements issued by NUS staff and NUS officers pressing for the motion to be diluted, the conference descended into chaos. Police were called to the conference floor as a precaution. The motion was voted through, but does not currently appear on the union's list of policies.

In 2025, in an open letter organised by the Not My NUS campaign, student leaders threatened to disaffiliated from the NUS should it not take a pro-Palestinian stance. The campaign also criticised the NUS's adoption of IHRA definition of antisemitism in 2017, which they claimed legitimised targeting people who hold pro-Palestine beliefs. In a letter leaked by NUS staff to The Gaudie, it was revealed that the NUS executive had written to the CEOs of the students' unions involved to request their help in pressuring officers who had signed onto the open letter to un-sign it or face a ban on attendance at NUS events and training.

The Not My NUS campaign responded with a vast referendum-based campaign to end affiliations to the NUS, leading to disaffiliation votes in a number of students' unions nationally, including from University of Cambridge in October 2025 and LSE in February 2026.

== See also ==
- List of students' unions in the United Kingdom not affiliated with the NUS
- National Union of Students Disabled Students' Campaign
- National Union of Students Scotland
- National Union of Students-Union of Students in Ireland
- National Union of Students Wales
- National Union of Students Women's Campaign
