= Labour Students =

Student wing of the UK Labour Party

National Labour Students
- Abbreviation: NLS
- Chairperson: Willow Parker
- Secretary: Alex Kyriacou
- Vice-chair: Kashvi Khanna
- Founded: 1971 (as National Organisation of Labour Students, refounded as National Labour Students in 2022)
- Headquarters: 20 Rushworth Street, London, SE1 0SS.
- Ideology: Social democracy
- International affiliation: International Union of Socialist Youth
- Parent organisation: Labour Party
- European affiliation: Young European Socialists

Website
- labourstudents.co.uk

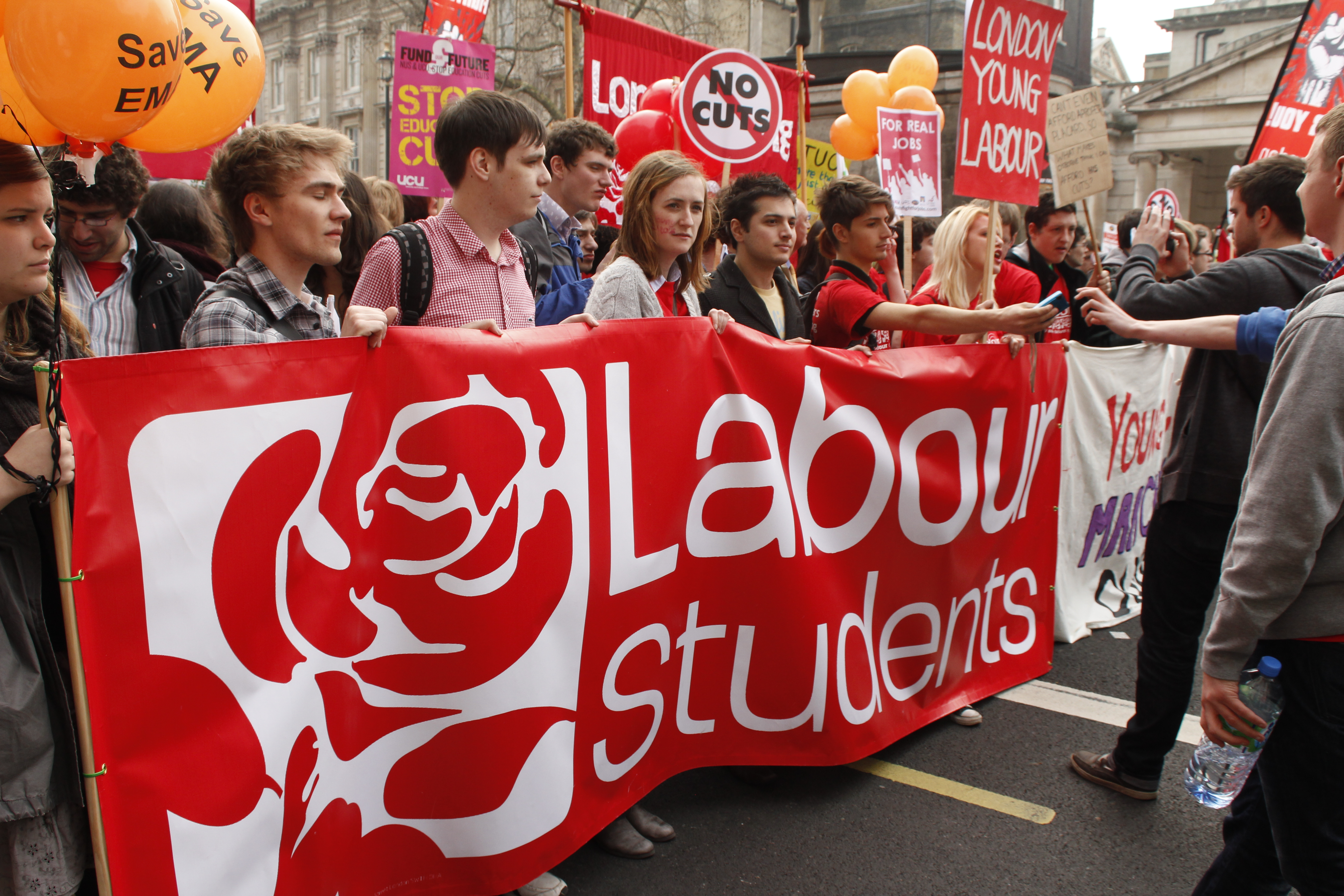
Labour Students protesting against government cuts in March 2011

National Labour Students (NLS) also known as Labour Students is a student organisation within the Labour Party of the United Kingdom. It is a network of affiliated college and university clubs, known as Labour Clubs, who campaign in their campuses and communities for Labour's values of equality and social justice.

Labour Students’ main activities include providing political education and training to its members, sending activists to by-elections and marginal constituencies across the country and organising politically within the National Union of Students and Student Unions.

Labour Students was disaffiliated from the Labour Party by the Party's National Executive Committee in September 2019, with the intent of replacing it with a new student organisation. Although campaigning activity continued to be organised under the Labour Students branding during the 2019 general election, the organisation subsequently ceased to exist.

A new, refounded National Labour Students (NLS) was passed at the 2021 Labour Party Conference. National Committee elections were held in August 2022 and Ben McGowan was elected as the inaugural chair of the organisation on 2 September 2022.

== History ==
The Labour Party's first organisation for students was the National Association of Labour Student Organisations (NALSO), which was founded in 1946 but had its recognition by the party withdrawn in 1967 after it was taken over by supporters of the Trotskyist Socialist Labour League. While the Scottish organisation continued, the Labour Party was left without a national student body.

In 1970, some Labour supporters created Students for a Labour Victory, a group intended to coordinate campaigning in the general election that year. That group then became the National Organisation of Labour Students (NOLS), which held its founding conference in 1971. Despite changing its name in the early 1990s, the current body, Labour Students, is still sometimes referred to by the acronym NOLS.

In its early years, NOLS was divided between two factions — members of the entryist Militant group and a mainstream left group, associated with the Tribune group of Labour MPs, which formed in January 1974 called Clause Four, after the central political statement of the Labour Party constitution. Militant controlled NOLS from January 1974 to December 1975. Members of NOLS in the 1970s included future parliamentarians Charles Clarke, Bill Speirs, Peter Mandelson, Sally Morgan, Mike Gapes, Mike Jackson, Nigel Stanley, Margaret Curran and Johann Lamont.

During Tony Blair's premiership, Labour Students opposed the Government's planned introduction of university "top-up" fees. Labour Students were broadly supportive of Gordon Brown's government.

In 2016, the national conference adopted a one-member-one-vote (OMOV) system for internal elections, through an amendment of its constitution. However many member clubs perceived this as being implemented incompletely and slowly, with accusations of vote-rigging in 2019. In the early 2019 Labour Students leadership election there were 507 eligible voters, out of a claimed approximately 30,000 Labour Party student members. As a consequence, about half of member clubs, including Oxford University Labour Club and Cambridge University Labour Club, disaffiliated from Labour Students.

Further to the disaffiliations by Labour university Clubs, a motion was tabled by Jon Lansman at the Labour Party NEC meeting in September 2019 to dissolve the current organisation on the grounds that it did not pay its affiliation fees nor submitted its political rules to the party. At the NEC meeting this motion passed and Labour Students is no longer affiliated to the Labour Party. This action was challenged by the incumbent Labour Students leadership, but they were unsuccessful.

A new, refounded National Labour Students (NLS) was passed at the 2021 Labour Party Conference. National Committee elections were held in August 2022 and Ben McGowan was elected as the inaugural chair of the organisation on 2 September 2022. Internal elections in 2024 saw the victory of the "Organise" faction, backed by Labour First and Progressive Britain, which defeated the left-wing "Socialist Future" group: Ruby Herbert replaced McGowan soon afterwards.

== Internal organisation ==
Prior to 2019, Labour Students was a 'socialist society', affiliated to the Labour Party. This means that, whilst its aims were broadly in line with the wider party, Labour Students was an independent organisation and was entitled to democratically determine its own policy and governance. Labour Students members were entitled to vote in the affiliates section of Labour leadership elections.

The refounded National Labour Students is a formal branch of the Labour Party, and as such is not responsible for its own governance. Any Labour Party member who is a student is automatically a member of National Labour Students

=== National Events ===
Generally, before the organisation's relaunch, Labour Students held four main national events each year, attended by club members from institutions across the country.

Summer Training
Summer Training is primarily intended for members entering their second and third years of study. There is often a focus on preparing Labour Clubs for recruitment drives at the beginning of the new academic year. The event is usually structured with a variety breakout sessions and workshops, led by industry experts, trade unions and other campaigning organisations. In recent years Summer Training has included sessions led by Matthew Doyle (former deputy director of Communications, 10 Downing Street), Kirsty McNeill (former adviser to Gordon Brown) and community organising group Movement for Change. There is also usually a heavy emphasis on training from the four liberation campaigns.

Political Weekend
Political Weekend is usually the event where Labour Students welcomes its new members each year. Labour Students usually hosts a number of high-profile speakers, including government ministers during periods of Labour government and members of the Shadow Cabinet in times of opposition.

Liberation Conference

Liberation Conference sees the election of Labour Students’ four Liberation Officers (see ‘Liberation Campaigns’). It also includes panels and sessions around issues of particular importance to Liberation groups, for example mental health services or tackling antisemitism on campuses.

National Conference
National Conference sees the election of the Labour Students National Committee for the following year, as well further policy debate. Though nominally described as an "election", only a small number of delegates vote, along lines pre-determined by their nominating clubs. National Conference is often held in conjunction with Young Labour Conference, to help reduce members' travel costs.

=== National Committee ===
The National Labour Students Committee convenes regularly and works together to ensure the organisation runs smoothly and works effectively to represent members.

=== National Committee ===
Role	2022-24	2024- 26	2026-28
Chair	Ben McGowan	Ruby Herbert	Willow Parker
Secretary	Jonathan Heywood	Issy Waite	Alex Kyriacou
Vice Chair	Fabiha Askari	Lewis Warner	Kashvi Khanna
BAME Officer	Elilee Arulkumar	Mason Humberstone	Awab Kennedy
Disabled Students Officer	Moya O'Rourke	Madeleine Wainman	James Davis
LGBT+ Officer	Kieron Warren	Rudi Ellis-Jones	Joshua Horsfall
Women's Officer	Lola Fayokun	Martha Dacombe	Esme Barlow Hall
Trans Officer	Alex Charilaou	Willow Parker	Heather McKay
East Midlands Rep	vacant	Ben Duffy	Lusungu Nkhoma
Eastern Rep	Molly Bloomfield	vacant	Donna Chiu
London Rep	Nimah Ogas-Hersi	Bruno Dent	Kasia Kramer
North West Rep	Chloe Brooks	Esme Barlow-Hall	Krish Daryanani
Northern Rep	Joshua Freestone	Emily Gill	Vacant
Scotland Chair	Solomon Cuthbertson	Emma Russell	Finn McGrady Strachan
South East Rep	Zahra Lahrie	Cai Parry	Aurora Cheesman
South West Rep	Daniel Chappel	Carys Skingle	Isaac Jones
Wales Rep	Dylan Lewis-Rowlands	Bethia Tucker	Joe Morden
West Midlands Rep	Lily Soaper	Yusuf Amin	Vacant
Yorkshire and Humber Rep	Eleanor Falshaw	Daniel Wilton	Millie Wood
Ordinary Rep	Zac Bates Fisher	Martin Barabas	Kira Lewis
Ordinary Rep	Emma Bean	Zack Hayward	Julia Pancer
Ordinary Rep	Hareem Ghani	Jess Hilton	Jack Leader
Ordinary Rep	Kieran Kavanagh	Rachel Holland	Eleni Barrett
Ordinary Rep	Libs Olley	Jacob Sammon	Jacob Sammon
Ordinary Rep	Cai Parry	Katie Truman	Yotam Havkin

=== Liberation Campaigns ===
Within Labour Students there are four autonomous liberation campaigns. These were the Women's, Lesbian Gay Bisexual & Trans, Disabled Students and Black Asian Minority Ethnic (BAME) Students campaigns, all of which are entitled to elect an officer to the National Committee. Labour Students holds caucuses for each of the liberation groups at every national event, has an equal opportunities policy and ensures all events are fully accessible.

=== Scotland and Wales ===
There are separate organisations for Labour Clubs in the devolved nations, known as Welsh Labour Students and Scottish Labour Students respectively. The Chairs of these two organisations also sit on the committee of Labour Students as full members.

== Campaigning ==
=== Priority Campaign ===
Labour Students took on a major campaign each year, voted for in an all-member ballot. Recent campaigns have included:

- "Make Child Poverty History" campaign (2006–2007)
- "Sex, Lives and Politics" (2005–2006) – This was followed by a government reduction of VAT on condoms to the EU minimum of 5%.
- The Living Wage Campaign (2011–2013) – Labour Students worked in collaboration with the trade union UNISON to equip members with the skills to fight for a living wage to be paid to staff on their university campuses. The campaign was extremely successful, with clubs including Manchester and Kent securing the living wage at their institutions.
- The Voter Registration Campaign (2012–2013) – Labour Students intended to increase the number of students registered to vote.
- A Million More Voices (2016–2017) - Campaign aimed at introducing automatic voter registration.
- Somewhere To Call Home (2017–2018) – Campaign aimed at tackling "poor living conditions and extortionate rents for students."
- Time For Rights (2018– 2019) – Campaign to protect the rights of workers in Students’ Unions and Universities from Brexit.

== Labour Students and the National Union of Students ==
Every year, Labour Students actively organised and campaigned within the National Union of Students (NUS). As a result of this, Labour Students was viewed as an influential faction within the NUS and its members were frequently elected to the NUS National Executive Council (NEC) and to full-time officer positions, although 2015 saw a majority of their candidates losing to those to the Left.

=== History within the National Union of Students ===
In the late 1970s, Labour Students (then NOLS) worked within the NUS as part of the Broad Left, a student coalition which also included the student wing of the Communist Party of Great Britain and independent left wing students. The Broad Left stood slates of candidates in NUS elections. (The Broad Left is not to be confused with the post-1997 grouping Student Broad Left.) In the early 1980s NOLS broke with the Broad Left and presented its own slate of candidates in NUS elections. In 1982, NOLS won the presidency of NUS on its own for the first time. A succession of NOLS candidates were elected to the NUS Presidency until 2000 with the strongest challenges generally coming from those to the left of the Labour Party. Several former NOLS NUS Presidents, including Charles Clarke and Jim Murphy, went on to serve as Cabinet ministers, serving as members of a Labour government. Throughout this period, NOLS members of the NUS National Executive Committee were a minority, but exercised effective control.

Labour Students' flagship policy in NUS was the rejection of campaigning for universal grants, in favour of targeting student support funds towards poorer students through means testing. National Conference 2006 narrowly supported this policy, but it was renewed with a much increased majority in 2007. However, the position was reversed again when National Conference 2016 voted to campaign for universal living grants, funded through progressive taxation, in both further and higher education, in a policy change that had been pushed forward by the left-wing group, the National Campaign Against Fees and Cuts.

== Alumni ==
Recent graduates of Labour Students have often gone on to work in the Labour Party Headquarters, as ministerial special advisers, Trade Union officials and as members of left-leaning think tanks. Many also go on to enjoy successful careers outside of the politics.

=== Notable former Labour Students officers ===
- Mike Gapes (Chair 1976) – Former MP for Ilford South (1992–2019).
- John Mann (Chair 1983 and 1984) – Former MP for Bassetlaw (2001–2019).
- Sarah Boyack (Chair 1985) – MSP for the Lothian Region.
- Ben Lucas (Chair 1986) – Former special adviser to Jack Straw.
- Simon Buckby (Chair 1989) – Former adviser to John Prescott and then advertising director for Labour's 1997 election campaign.
- Paul Richards (Chair 1990) – Former Special Adviser to Hazel Blears and parliamentary candidate for the seats of Lewes (2001) and Billericay (1997).
- Tom Watson (Chair 1992) – Labour MP for West Bromwich East, Deputy Leader of the Labour Party from 2015 to 2019
- Michael Dugher (Chair 1997) – Former MP for Barnsley East.
- Patrick Diamond (Chair 1998) – Former special adviser to Peter Mandelson and Tony Blair, Director of Policy at the Equality and Human Rights Commission.
- Ellie Reeves (Chair 2002) – MP for Lewisham West & Penge.
- John Howarth (National Secretary 1981–2) – Former MEP for South East England.
- Jacqui Smith (National Secretary) – Former and first female Home Secretary.
- Caroline Flint (Women's Officer 1982–1984) – Former Shadow Secretary of State for Communities and Local Government.
- Gloria De Piero (Campaigns & Membership Officer 1996) – Television presenter and former MP for Ashfield.
- John Woodcock (National Secretary 2002) – Former MP for Barrow and Furness.
- Blair McDougall (Chair, Scottish Labour Students 2001–2003) – Former Special Adviser to James Purnell and Director of the Better Together campaign, Labour candidate for East Renfrewshire 2017.
- Rob Minshull (National Secretary 1986) – Broadcaster.
- Jonathan Ashworth (National Secretary 2000) – Former Deputy Political Secretary to Gordon Brown and MP for Leicester South.
- Vicky Foxcroft (Chair 2001) – MP for Lewisham Deptford.
- Iain McNicol (Campaigns & Membership Officer 1993) – Former General Secretary of the Labour Party and Labour Peer.
- Wes Streeting (Member of the National Committee) – Shadow Secretary of State for Health and Social Care.
- Luke Akehurst (National Secretary 1995 - 96)
- Olivia Bailey (Chair 2011 - 12)
- Kate Dearden (Chair 2016 - 17)
- Connor Rand (Membership & Campaigns, 2016–17)
