= List of students' unions in the United Kingdom =

In the United Kingdom, students' unions are organisations that exist at universities to represent the interests of students. Although most are known as Students' Unions other common terms include Guilds of Students and Students' Associations. Students' unions facilitate student societies, such as sports clubs and student newspapers, as well as representing students politically to their respective universities and at a national level. However, it is possible for individual students not to be a member of their union.

The majority of unions are affiliated with the National Union of Students, although a minority are not and unions can disaffiliate from the NUS. In Northern Ireland, all unions are members of the National Union of Students-Union of Students in Ireland.

Students' unions tend to be run by a team of student-elected sabbatical officers. Funding for the unions comes from a "block grant" from the university and the provision of services to members through the running of shops and bars. Students' unions are regulated under the Education Act 1994, an Act of Parliament which states that students' unions must be run in a democratic manner. Edinburgh University Students' Association is the oldest students' union in the United Kingdom and Liverpool Guild of Students is England's oldest students' union. The University of Glasgow has two independent students' unions, although undergraduates usually only join one of these (but can choose to join both). Some student common rooms at collegiate universities also have the status of students' unions under the 1994 Education Act and exist as independent charities. Keele University also has two independent unions, one for all students (Keele University Students' Union) and one specifically for its postgraduate community (Keele Postgraduate Association - also known as the KPA).

== Notes ==
- Further education colleges can have students' unions (which may also be members of the NUS), however, this article only lists higher education unions
- This article lists all higher education unions regardless of whether they are affiliated to the NUS
- Member institutions of the University of London are listed under "L"
- College common rooms at collegiate universities that are independent charities are students' unions under the 1994 act, but must be registered with the Charity Commission if they have an income over £100k. These are listed under their parent university.

== A ==
- University of Aberdeen
  - Aberdeen University Students' Association
- University of Abertay Dundee
  - University of Abertay Dundee Students' Association
- Aberystwyth University
  - Aberystwyth Guild of Students
- Anglia Ruskin University
  - Anglia Ruskin Students' Union
- University of the Arts London
  - University of the Arts London Students' Union
- Arts University Bournemouth
  - Arts University Bournemouth Students' Union]
- Aston University
  - Aston Students' Union

== B ==
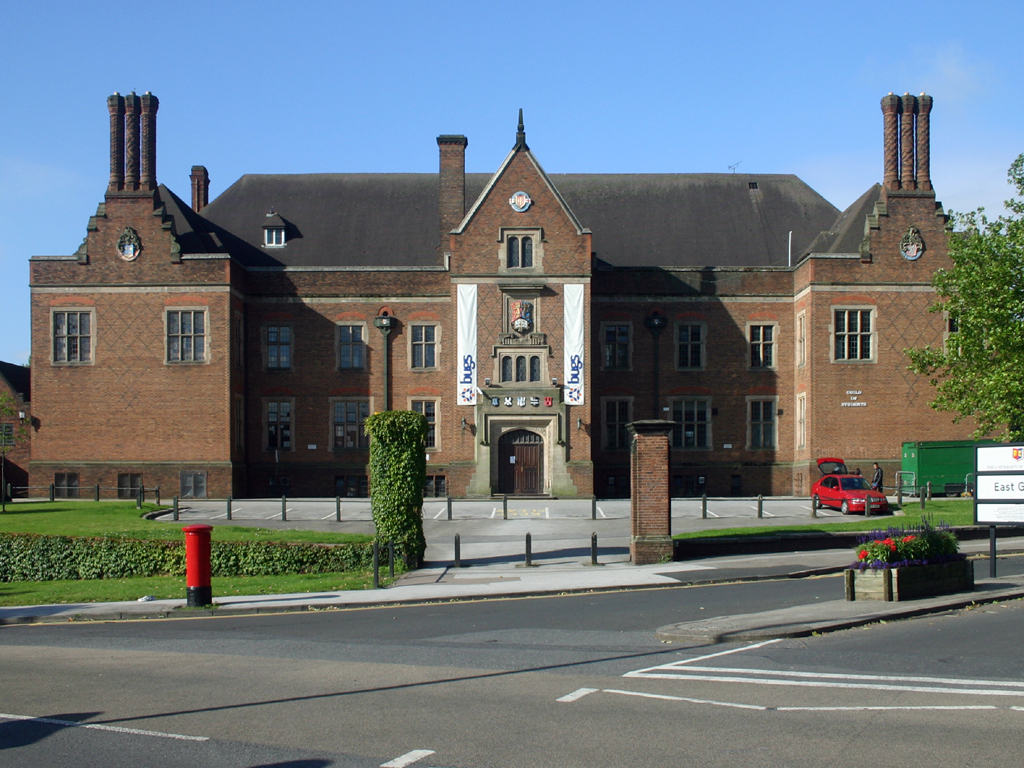
University of Birmingham Guild of Students

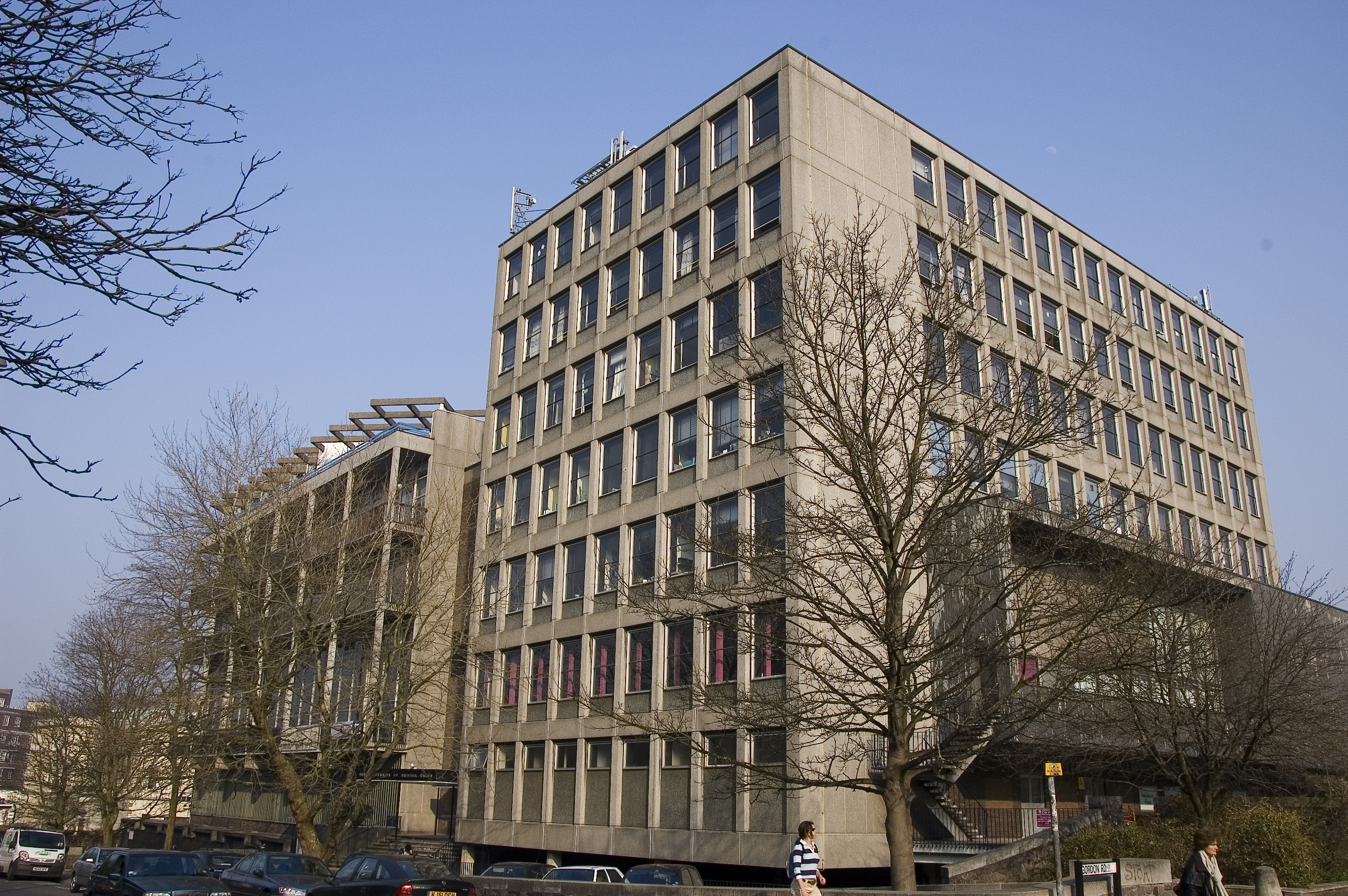
University of Bristol Union

- Bangor University
  - Bangor University Students' Union
- University of Bath
  - University of Bath Students' Union
- Bath Spa University
  - Bath Spa University Students' Union
- University of Bedfordshire
  - University of Bedfordshire Students' Union
- University of Birmingham
  - University of Birmingham Guild of Students
- Birmingham City University
  - Birmingham City Students' Union
- Bishop Grosseteste University
  - Bishop Grosseteste Students Union
- University Centre at Blackburn College
  - Blackburn College Students' Union
- University of Bolton
  - University of Bolton Students' Union
- Bournemouth University
  - Students' Union at Bournemouth University
- University of Bradford
  - University of Bradford Union
- University of Brighton
  - University of Brighton Students' Union
- University of Bristol
  - University of Bristol Union
- Brunel University
  - Union of Brunel Students
- University of Buckingham
  - University of Buckingham Students' Union

== C ==
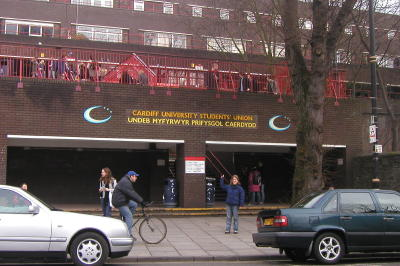
Cardiff University Students' Union

- University of Cambridge
  - Cambridge Students' Union
  - Colleges:
    - Christ's College Graduate Society
    - Corpus Christi College Junior Combination Room
    - Downing College Junior Common Room
    - Downing College Middle Common Room
    - Fitzwilliam College Junior Members' Association
    - Girton College Junior Combination Room
    - Girton College Middle Combination Room
    - Sidney Sussex College Students’ Union
    - Trinity College Students' Union
- Canterbury Christ Church University
  - Christ Church Students' Union
- Canterbury College
  - Canterbury College Students' Union
- Cardiff Metropolitan University
  - Cardiff Met SU
- Cardiff University
  - Cardiff University Students' Union
- University of Central Lancashire
  - University of Central Lancashire Students' Union
- University of Chester
  - Chester Students' Union
- University of Chichester
  - University of Chichester Students' Union
- City University London
  - City University Students' Union
- Courtauld Institute of Art
  - Courtauld Institute of Art Students' Union
- Coventry University
  - Coventry University Students' Union
- Cranfield University
  - Cranfield Students' Association
- University for the Creative Arts
  - University for the Creative Arts Students' Union
- Crichton University Campus, Dumfries
  - Crichton University Campus Students' Association
- University of Cumbria
  - University of Cumbria Students' Union

== D ==
- De Montfort University
  - De Montfort Students' Union
- University of Derby
  - University of Derby Students' Union
- University of Dundee
  - Dundee University Students' Association
- Durham University
  - Durham Students' Union
  - Maintained colleges:
    - Grey College Junior Common Room
    - Hatfield College Junior Common Room
    - Josephine Butler College Junior Common Room
    - St Aidan's College Junior Common Room
    - St Cuthbert's Society Junior Common Room
    - Ustinov College Graduate Common Room
    - Van Mildert College Junior Common Room
  - Recognised colleges:
    - St John's Common Room

== E ==
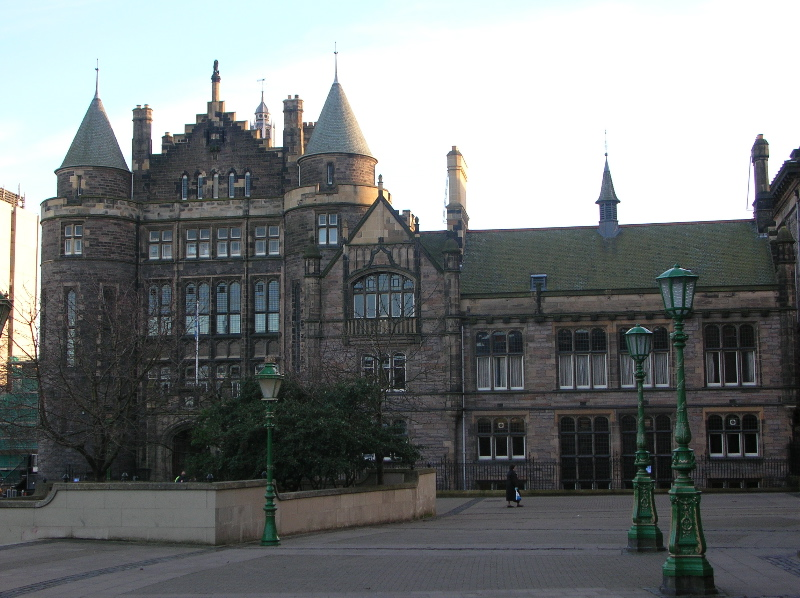
Teviot Row House, one of the union buildings at Edinburgh University Students' Association.

- University of East Anglia
  - Union of UEA Students
- Edge Hill University
  - Edge Hill Students' Union
- University of Edinburgh
  - Edinburgh University Students' Association
- Edinburgh Napier University
  - Napier Students' Association
- Edinburgh's Telford College
  - Edinburgh's Telford College Student Union
- University of Essex
  - Essex University Students' Union
- University of Exeter
  - Exeter Students Guild
  - Falmouth and Exeter Students' Union

== G ==
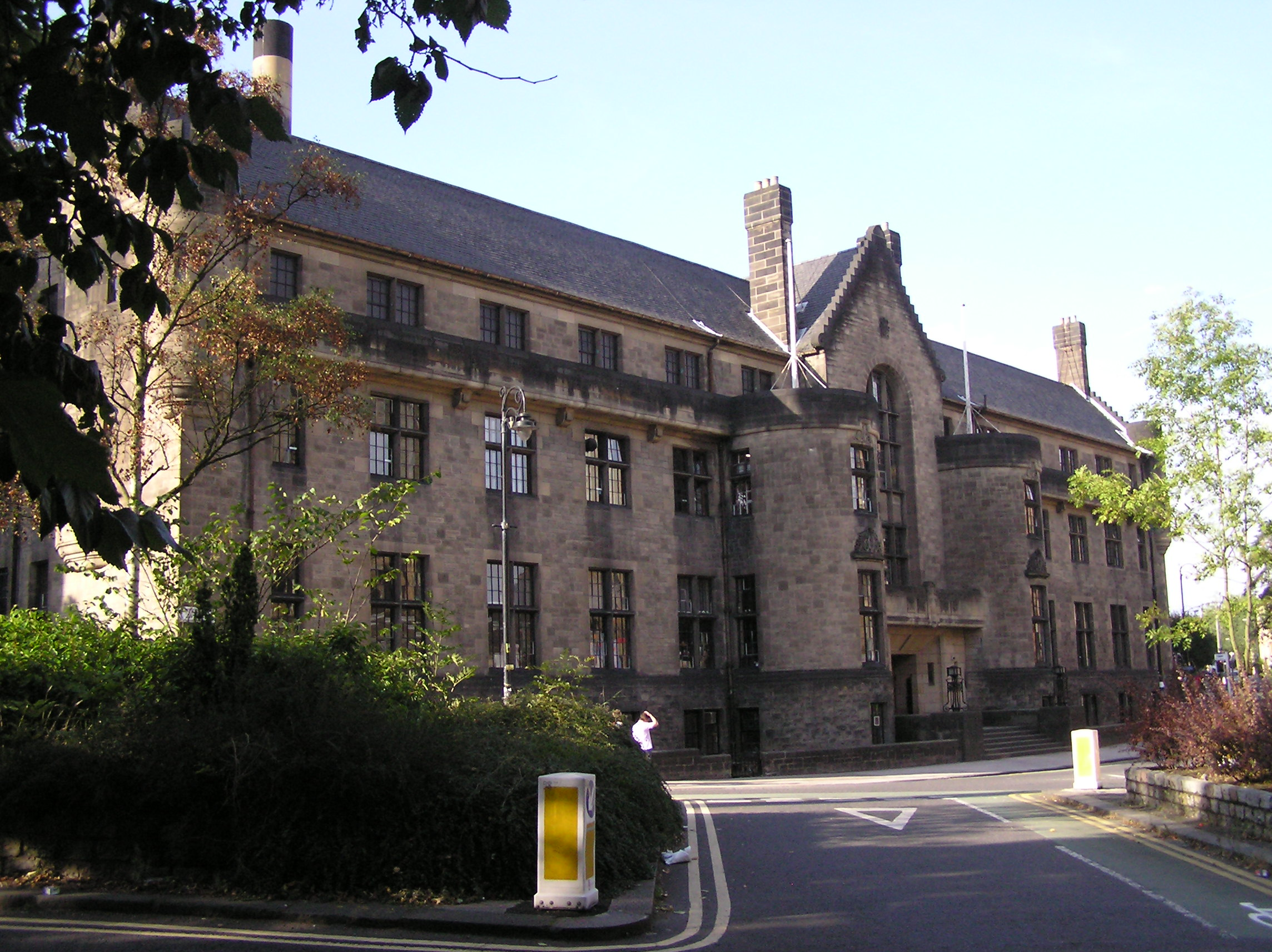
Glasgow University Union

- University of Glamorgan
  - University of Glamorgan Union
- University of Glasgow
  - Glasgow University Students' Representative Council
  - Glasgow University Union
  - Queen Margaret Union
- Glasgow Caledonian University
  - Glasgow Caledonian University Students' Association
- Glasgow School of Art
  - Glasgow School of Art Students' Association
- University of Gloucestershire
  - University of Gloucestershire Students' Union
- Glyndŵr University
  - Glyndŵr University Students' Guild
- Goldsmiths College
  - Goldsmiths Students' Union
- University of Greenwich
  - Students' Union University of Greenwich

== H ==
- Heriot-Watt University
  - Heriot-Watt University Students Association
- University of Hertfordshire
  - University of Hertfordshire Students' Union
- University of Huddersfield
  - Huddersfield Students Union
- University of Hull
  - Hull University Union
- Hull College Group
  - Hull College Group Students' Union

== I ==
- Imperial College London
  - Imperial College Union

== K ==
- Keele University
  - Keele University Students' Union
  - Keele Postgraduate Association
- University of Kent
  - University of Kent Students' Union
- King's College London
  - King's College London Students' Union
- University of Kingston
  - Kingston University Students' Union

== L ==
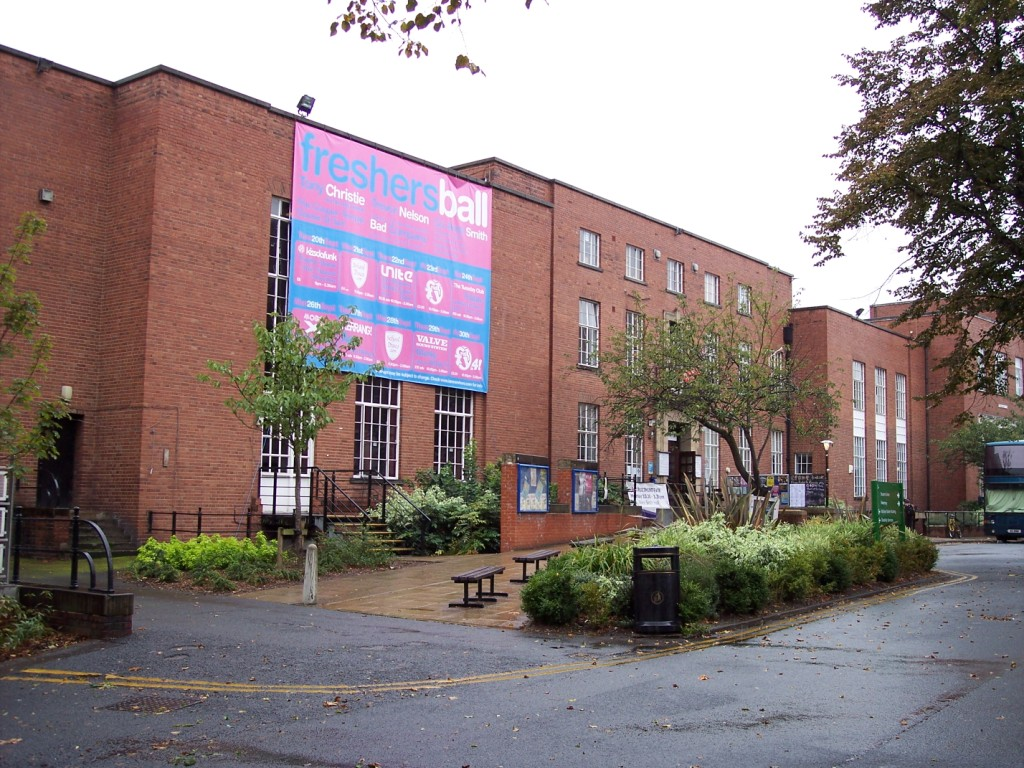
Leeds University Union

- University of Wales, Lampeter
  - University of Wales Lampeter Students Union
- Lancaster University
  - Lancaster University Students' Union
- University of Leeds
  - Leeds University Union
- Leeds Beckett University
  - Leeds Beckett Student Union
- Leeds Trinity University
  - Leeds Trinity Students' Union
- University of Leicester
  - University of Leicester Students' Union
- University of Lincoln
  - University of Lincoln Students' Union
- University of Liverpool
  - Liverpool Guild of Students
- Liverpool Hope University
  - Liverpool Hope Students' Union
- Liverpool John Moores University
  - Liverpool Students' Union
- Loughborough University
  - Loughborough Students' Union

=== London ===
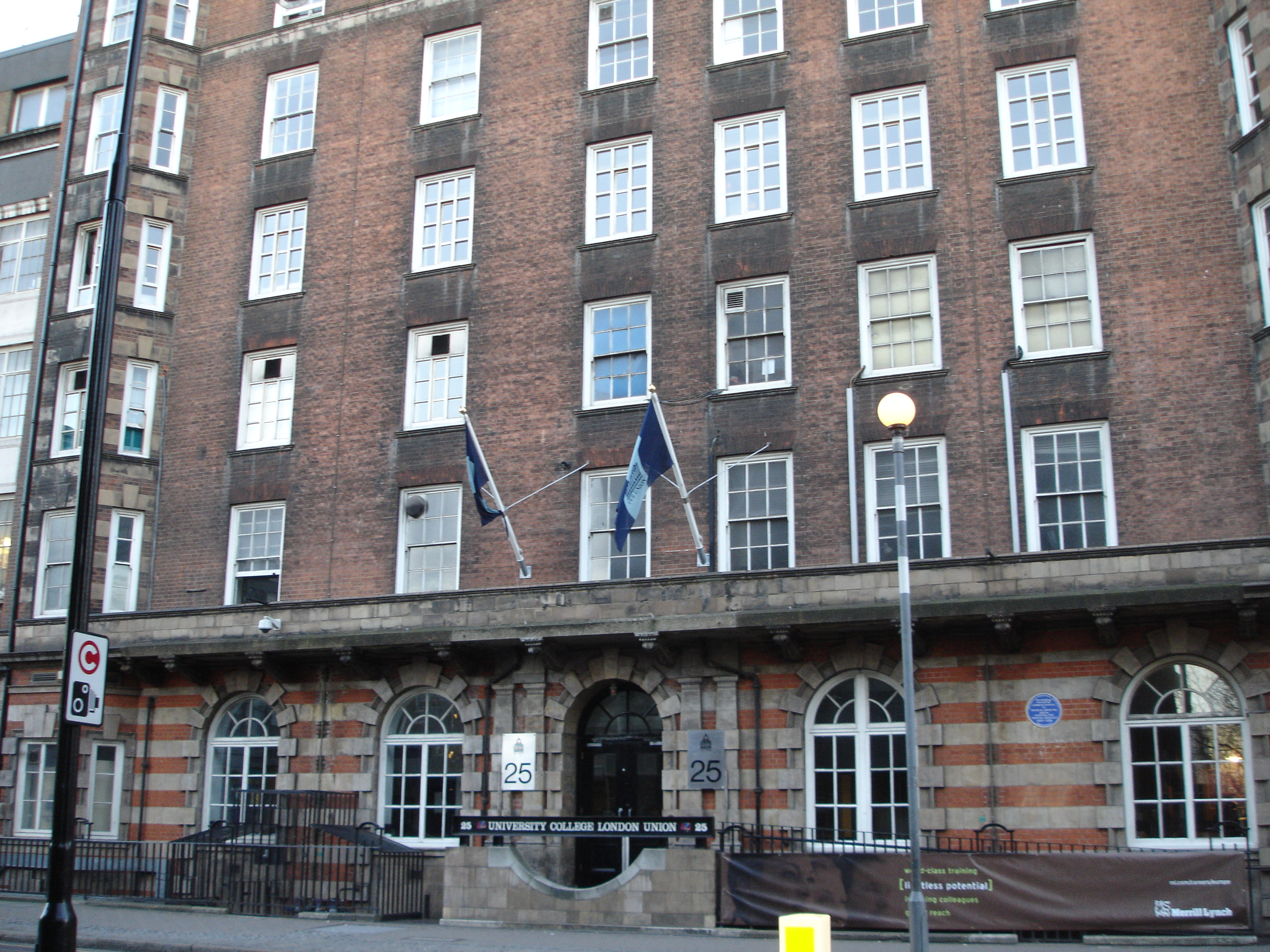
University College London Union.

- University of London
  - University of London Union (Abolished)
- Birkbeck, University of London
  - Birkbeck Students' Union
- City University
  - City University London Students' Union
- Courtauld Institute of Art
  - Courtauld Institute of Art Students' Union
- University of East London
  - University of East London Students' Union
- St George's, University of London
  - St George's Students' Union
- Goldsmiths, University of London
  - Goldsmiths Students' Union
- King's College London
  - King's College London Students' Union
- London Metropolitan University
  - London Metropolitan University Students' Union
- University of London Institute in Paris
  - University of London Institute in Paris Students' Union
- London South Bank University
  - London South Bank University Students' Union
- University College London
  - University College London Union
- London School of Economics
  - LSE Students' Union
- Royal Holloway, University of London
  - Royal Holloway Students' Union
- Queen Mary, University of London
  - Queen Mary Students' Union

== M ==
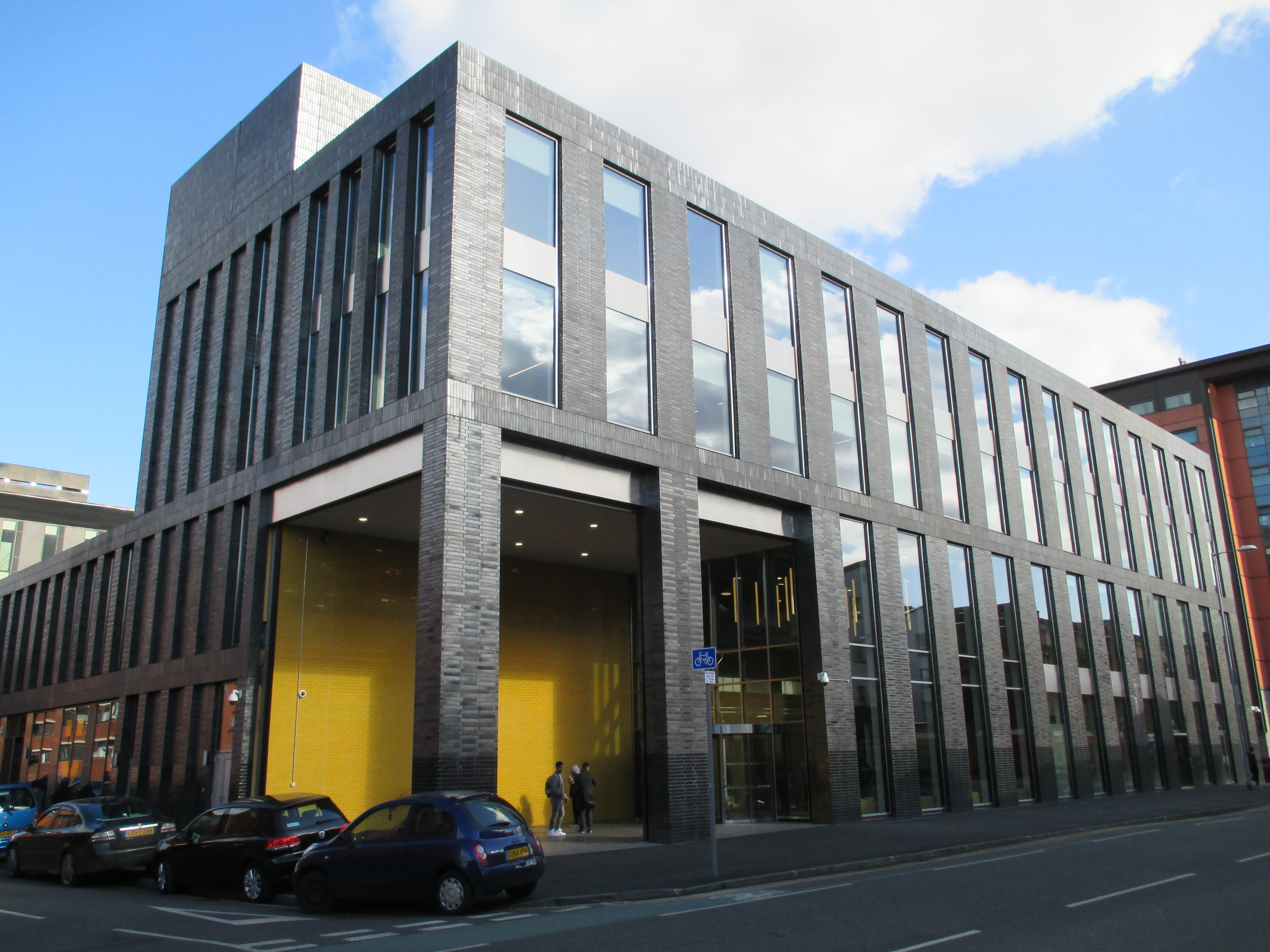
The Union MMU

- University of Manchester
  - University of Manchester Students' Union
- Manchester Metropolitan University
  - The Union MMU
- Middlesex University
  - Middlesex University Students' Union

== N ==
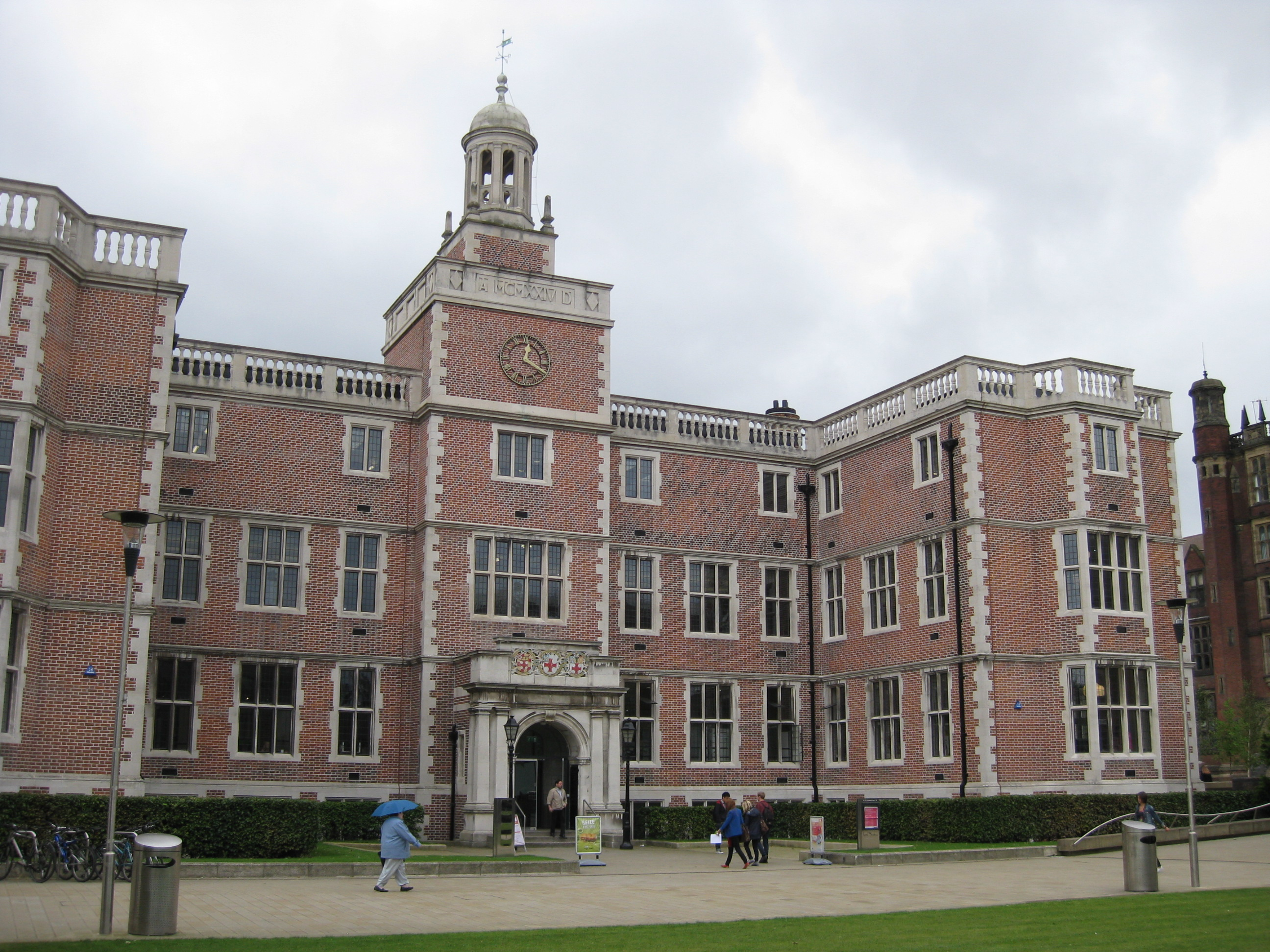
Newcastle University Students' Union

- Newcastle University
  - Newcastle University Students' Union
- Newman University
  - Newman Student Union
- University of Wales, Newport
  - Newport Students' Union
- Northampton College
  - Northampton College Students' Union
- University of Northampton
  - University of Northampton Students' Union
- Northumbria University
  - Northumbria Students' Union
- Norwich University of the Arts
  - Norwich University of the Arts Students' Union
- University of Nottingham
  - University of Nottingham Students' Union
- Nottingham Trent University
  - Nottingham Trent Students' Union

== O ==
- Open University
  - Open University Students' Union (Open SU)
- University of Oxford
  - Oxford University Student Union
  - Colleges:
    - Corpus Christi Junior Common Room
    - St Hughes Junior Common Room
- Oxford Brookes University
  - Oxford Brookes Students' Union

== P ==
- Plymouth College of Art
  - Plymouth College of Art Students' Union
- University of Plymouth
  - University of Plymouth Student Union
- University of Portsmouth
  - University of Portsmouth Students' Union

== Q ==
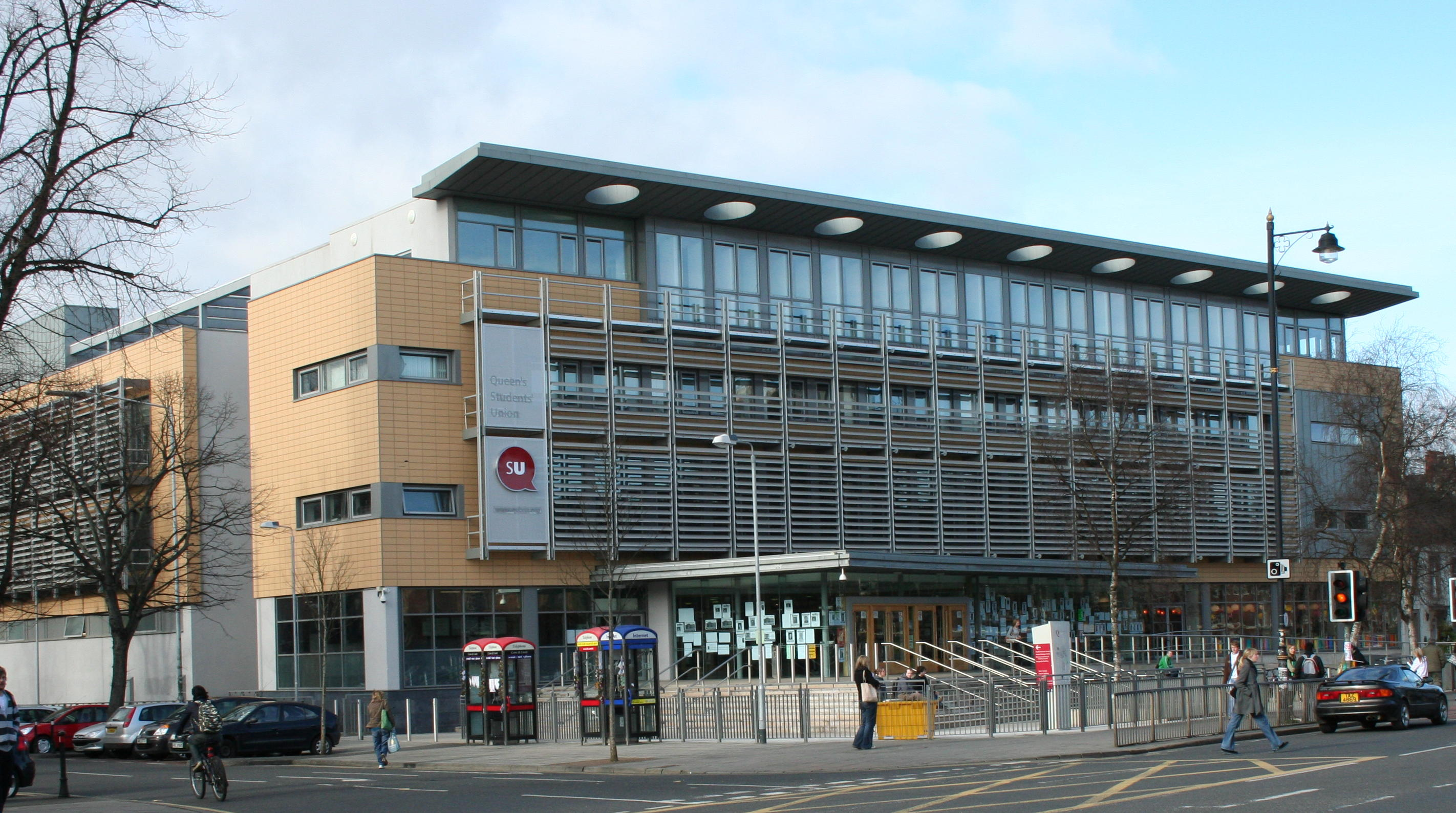
Queen's University Belfast Students' Union

- Queen's University Belfast
  - Queen's University Belfast Students' Union
- Queen Margaret University
  - Queen Margaret University College Students' Union

== R ==
- University of Reading
  - Reading University Students' Union
- The Robert Gordon University
  - Robert Gordon University Student Association
- Roehampton University
  - Roehampton University Students Union
- The Royal Central School of Speech and Drama
  - Central Students’ Union
- Royal Agricultural University
  - Royal Agricultural University Students' Union
- Royal College of Art
  - Royal College of Art Students' Union

== S ==
- University of St Andrews
  - University of St Andrews Students' Association
- University of Salford
  - University of Salford Students' Union
- School of Oriental and African Studies
  - SOAS Students' Union
- University of Sheffield
  - University of Sheffield Union of Students
- Sheffield Hallam University
  - Sheffield Hallam Union
- University of Southampton
  - University of Southampton Students' Union
- Southampton Solent University
  - Solent University Students' Union
- Staffordshire University
  - Staffordshire University Students' Union
- University of Stirling
  - Stirling University Students' Association
- University of Strathclyde
  - University of Strathclyde Students' Association
- University Campus Suffolk
  - University Campus Suffolk Students' Union
- University of Sunderland
  - University of Sunderland Students' Union
- University of Surrey
  - University of Surrey Students Union
- University of Sussex
  - University of Sussex Students' Union
- Swansea Metropolitan University
  - Swansea Metropolitan Student Union
- Swansea University
  - Swansea University Students' Union

== T ==
- University of Teesside
  - Teesside Students Union
- Thames Valley University
  - Thames Valley University Students' Union

== W ==
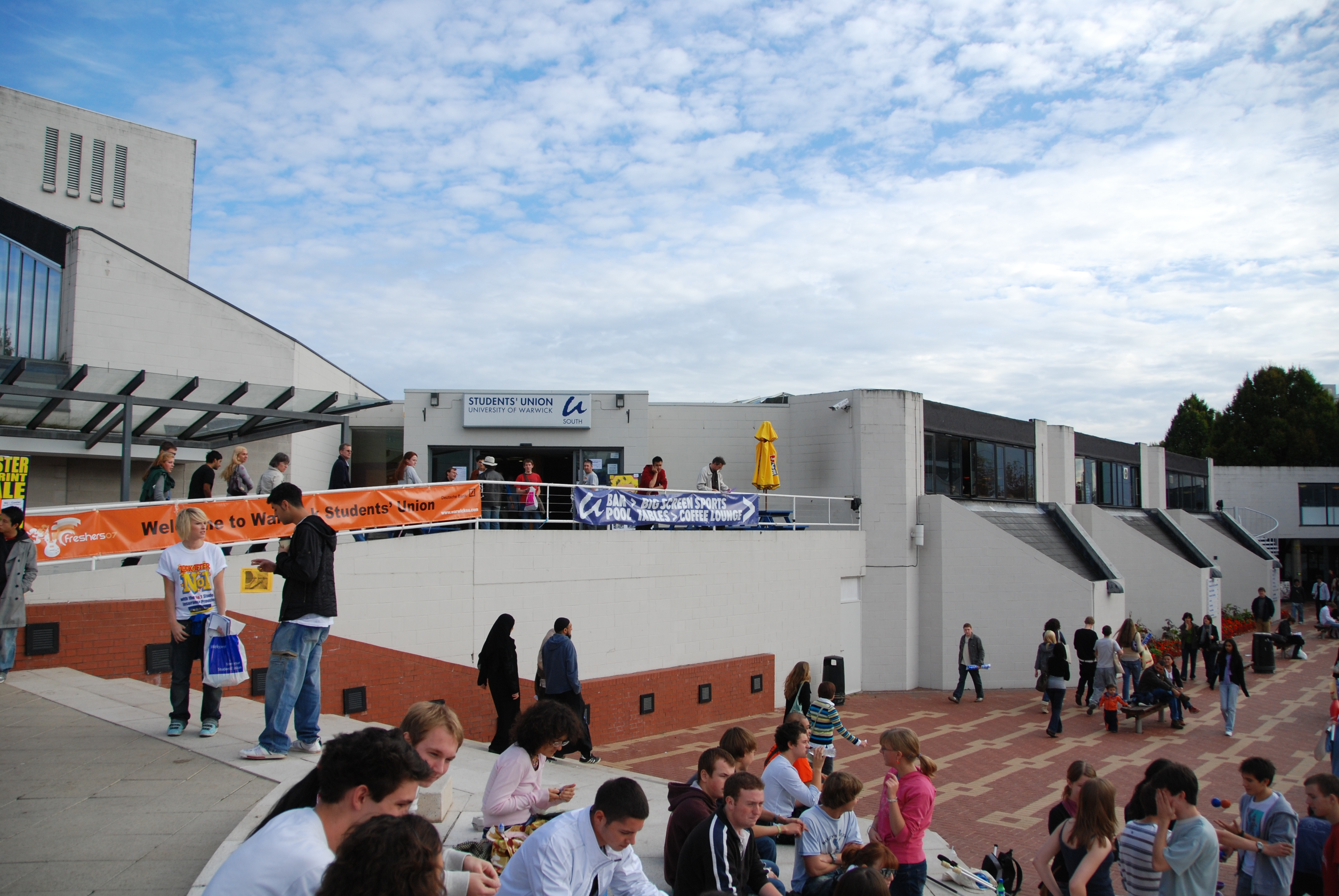
University of Warwick Students' Union

- University of Warwick
  - University of Warwick Students' Union
- University of Westminster
  - Westminster Students Union
- University of the West of England
  - UWE Students' Union
- University of the West of Scotland
  - Student Association of the University of the West of Scotland
- University of Winchester
  - Winchester Student Union
- University of Worcester
  - Worcester Students' Union
- University of Wolverhampton
  - Wolverhampton Students Union

== Y ==
- University of York
  - University of York Students' Union
- York St John University
  - York St John Students' Union

== See also ==
- List of trade unions in the United Kingdom
- Student unionism in the United Kingdom
- List of universities in the United Kingdom
- National Union of Students of the United Kingdom
  - National Union of Students Scotland
  - NUS-USI – a joint project between the National Union of Students of the United Kingdom and the Union of Students in Ireland
- Coalition of Higher Education Students in Scotland, now defunct.
- National Postgraduate Committee
