= List of students' unions in the United Kingdom not affiliated with the NUS =

This article lists students' unions in the United Kingdom that are not affiliated with the National Union of Students (NUS UK). Most students' unions in the United Kingdom are affiliated to NUS UK, although a minority are not affiliated, have never been affiliated, or have disaffiliated following student referendums or other constitutional processes. As of May 2026, 28 university students' unions were not affiliated to NUS UK, including students' unions or representative bodies at ten of the 24 Russell Group universities. (Note: Out of the 24 Russell Group Universities, ten have Student Unions which are not affiliated (Glasgow, Southampton, Imperial, Queen Mary, York, Cambridge, LSE, Liverpool, Manchester, and UCL))

The reasons for non-affiliation vary between institutions. Some students' unions or representative bodies, such as the Open University Students Association, have never been affiliated to NUS UK. Others, particularly in Scotland, were historically associated with the Scottish Union of Students before its merger with NUS in 1971, or disaffiliated in later decades.

Several disaffiliation votes have later been reversed. Durham Students' Union voted to disaffiliate in March 2010, but subsequently voted to reaffiliate in January 2011. Oxford University Student Union was reported as having voted to disaffiliate in 2014, but the result was overturned after voting irregularities were uncovered.

A further wave of disaffiliations began in the mid-2010s, following the controversial election of Malia Bouattia as NUS president. Four unions voted to leave the national body in 2016: Lincoln, Newcastle (though Newcastle voted to rejoin in 2026), Hull and Loughborough.

From 2025, several students' unions voted to leave NUS UK in campaigns that were linked by campaigners and student media to criticism of NUS UK's response to Palestine solidarity activism, alongside wider concerns over democracy, representation, accountability and value for money. Cambridge Students' Union voted to disaffiliate in October 2025; in the same referendum, students also voted for Cambridge SU to campaign to end university investments and collaborations with institutions involved in occupation and weapons manufacture. Varsity reported that the pro-disaffiliation campaign was led by Cambridge for Palestine and that campaigners criticised NUS UK over Palestine and Islamophobia.

In 2026, students at LSE Students' Union, Liverpool Guild of Students, University of Manchester Students' Union, Sheffield Hallam Students' Union, Leeds Beckett Students' Union, City St George's Students' Union, the University of Bath Students' Union and Students' Union UCL also voted to disaffiliate from NUS UK. At Liverpool, the official Leave campaign statement argued that NUS UK was poor value for money, lacked democratic and political accountability, and had taken nearly two years to address the genocide in Gaza.

== Non-affiliated students' unions ==
University	Leave Year	Remarks
Open University Students Association		Never affiliated.
Glasgow University Students' Representative Council: Glasgow University Union; Queen Margaret Union		Formerly a member of the Scottish Union of Students (SUS) until it merged with the NUS in 1971.
University of St Andrews Students' Association		Formerly a member of the SUS, it joined the NUS but disaffiliated in 1975.
Dundee University Students' Association		Formerly a member of the SUS, it joined the NUS but disaffiliated in 1994.
University of Southampton Students' Union	2002	
Imperial College Union	2008	Joined the NUS's trading consortium in 2024.
Cardiff Met SU	2009	
Loughborough Students' Union	2016	Joined the NUS's trading consortium.
Hull University Union	2016	
University of Surrey Students' Union	2017	
University of Essex Students' Union	2017	
Queen Margaret University Students' Union	2019	
University of Portsmouth Student's Union	2019	
University of Lincoln Students' Union	2019	Voted to disaffiliate in 2016, but overturned the decision within December of the same year.
Reading Students' Union	2022	
Queen Mary University of London Student's Union	2022	
University of Brighton Students' Union	2022	Is a member of NUS's trading consortium.
Birkbeck Students' Union	2023	
University of York Students' Union	2024	Disaffiliated in 2024 through a Trustee Board resolution. Disaffiliation was later confirmed via referendum in 2026.
Cambridge Students' Union	2025	
LSE Students' Union	2026	
Liverpool Guild of Students	2026	
University of Manchester Students' Union	2026	
Sheffield Hallam Students' Union	2026	
Leeds Beckett Students' Union	2026	
City St George's Students' Union	2026	
University of Bath Students' Union	2026	
Students’ Union UCL	2026	

== See also ==
- List of students' unions in the United Kingdom
