= University of Southampton Students' Union =

University of Southampton Students' Union SUSU
- Motto: Our Students' Union
- Institution: University of Southampton
- Location: Building 42, University of Southampton, University Road, Southampton, SO17 1BJ
- Established: 1903
- President: Krzysztof Mikulski
- Chief Executive: Sonia Cottrell
- Vice presidents: Joshie Christian (Education); Annie Whyman (Inclusion); Harvey Penycate-Smith (Communities); Charlie Bell (Sports)
- Colours: Burgundy, Navy and Gold
- Website: www.susu.org

The University of Southampton Students' Union, branded and commonly known as SUSU (a contraction of Southampton University Students' Union), is the students' union at the University of Southampton in southern England, United Kingdom. SUSU operates a number of facilities for students at the university, represents the students to the university and at the university council, as well as providing support services and social activities. The union is financed through its operations, a grant from the university, and additional benefits brought by its charitable status.

It is based on the main Highfield Campus, which is where most of its facilities currently exist, but the union also operates a presence at the Winchester School of Art and helps student societies and groups at the other campuses of the university. All students at the university become members of the union automatically unless they specifically request to opt out. Its operation is enshrined in law through the Education Act 1994, the university charter granted in 1952, and the Union's constitution.

Strategic direction is shared between the chief executive and the five elected Sabbatical officers who are elected each year from the student body.

== History ==
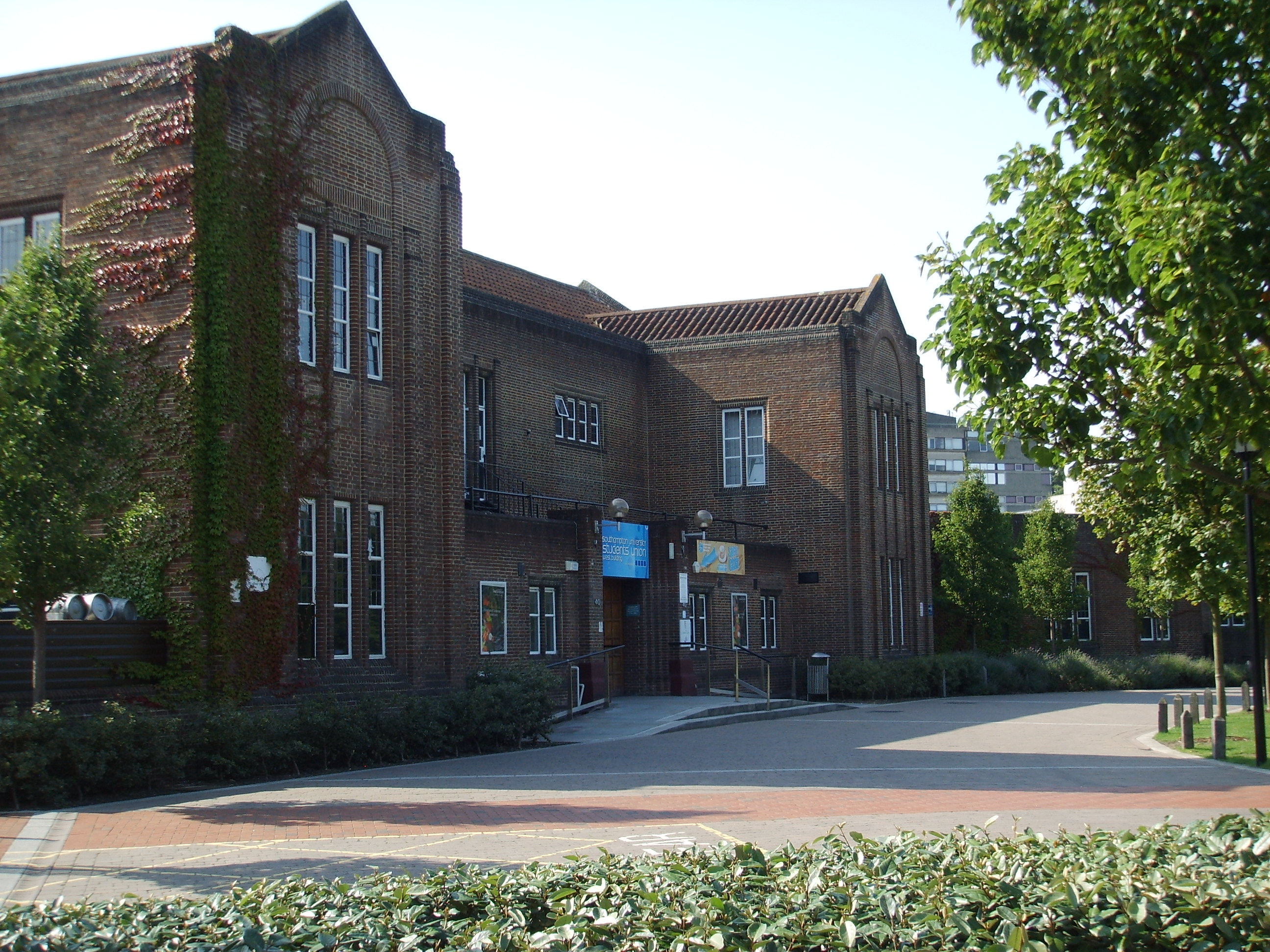
The 1940 constructed Building 40, pictured in 2009.

=== Pre-university ===
The origins of the students' union lie following the creation of the Hartley University College in 1902, which saw the Southampton-based Hartley Institute become a branch of the University of London and adopting the structure more akin to universities. This included the first students' union, simply known as The College Union, in 1903, although it only became self-governed by students in 1921 with the introduction of the basic structure of one male and female member from each faculty. During this time, the union oversaw the expansion of student societies and clubs, including the student newspaper, the Wessex News, in 1936.

In 1940, the West Building (numbered Building 40 as part of the later numbering plan), a three-storey brick building across the road from the rest of the university buildings, was constructed and dedicated for student social use with common rooms, offices, games room, and a large attached refectory (now referred to as Garden Court). Following the Second World War, the university began to expand, passing 1,000 students for the first time, from a starting point of 171 in 1902.

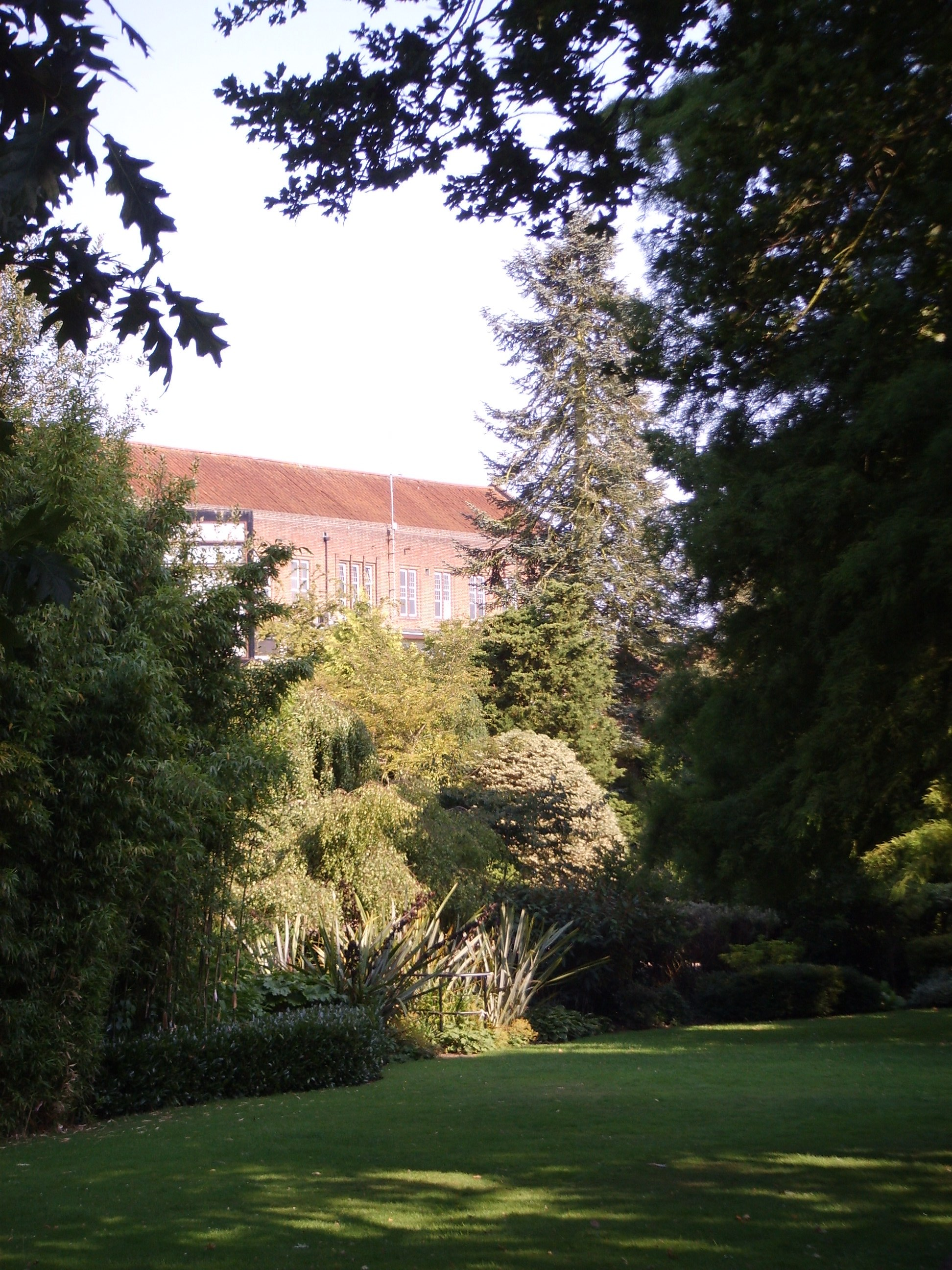
The gardens in Highfield Campus, formerly a quarry, with the Students' Union West Building (Building 40) in the background.

=== Late 20th century ===
In 1952, the University College was granted a royal charter to become the University of Southampton, which led to an expansion in the number of students and of the university itself. Part of the charter stated that 'There shall be a Union of Students of the university which shall have such representatives on the Council and Senate of the university' and so with the creation of a new Southampton University, as it was colloquially known, there was a reformation of the union as Southampton University Students' Union, or more simply, SUSU. In celebration, the games room of West Building was renovated into a bar, which would be extended with a sun room to form what is the current 'The Stag's' pub. The student union during this period continued with a growing number of societies, regular dances and annual Union balls, and the annual Rag day, where students processed in fancy dress through the streets in the aim of raising money.

During the 1960s, the university was set to expand at an even greater rate, following the publication of the Robbins Report, with a large number of new buildings added to the campus, new halls of residence added to the surrounding area of Southampton and more students, aiming to teach 4,000 students by the end of the decade-long masterplan in 1967. The Union reacted to the changes to the university's make-up and courses through new innovations such as the first Arts Festival in March 1961 to respond to the opening of two new buildings to house the Arts Faculty and the offering of courses in the Arts for the first time. The annual events of the Rag day and the Union dinner were both heavily criticised in this time, for being unruly and elitist respectively, with the Rag day having to be cancelled in 1960 after the university threatened disciplinary action and was only resurrected in 1963 while the Union dinner remained. The era also saw the beginning of widespread protests and political action on campus on a wide range of topics from local issues to international solidarity events.

With the expansion of the Union's activities, efforts were made to expand the union's facilities. The 1955/56 academic year saw the adoption of a financial policy by the university to allow the Union to expand into the full West building and by 1960/61, they had fully occupied the building and taken over day-to-day operations. In 1967, a new Students' Union building (Building 42) was completed, which was to become the headquarters and main building for the union and remains to this day. Designed by Sir Basil Spence, it was a four-storey building of modern design on the edge of a valley formed by a landscaped quarry, allowing it a low profile at street level. The new building contained a 475-seat refectory (still used and branded the Piazza), ballroom, bar, shop, and a debating chamber that was also suitable for musical performances. Sports facilities were also extensively incorporated into the building and became the only on-site sports facilities until the Jubilee Sports Centre was built on campus in 2004. These included squash courts, judo room, billiards room, table tennis room, activities room suitable for fencing and dancing, and a sports hall suitable for basketball, badminton, cricket, and tennis practice. The facilities were well used and respected by students when they opened. To cater for students' more domestic needs, the new Union building also included a laundry and ironing room, hair washing room, bath and shower cubicles, and studios for pottery and painting, which has not sustained demand. Shortly after this, the West building, which was connected to the new building by tunnel, was refurbished to house a TV room, Radio club room, offices for Wessex News, a second hand book and record exchange, and club and society meeting rooms.

As the Union expanded, the governance of the Union was updated to introduce sabbatical officers. During the 1970s, the Students' Union began to become more involved with the community and more concerned with having a say in the running of the university and of the UK Government's policy towards the university. In the 1970/71 academic year, the union held a free concert in the summer term to involve the community and provide some community service, which was seen as a success. Towards the end of the 1970s, the university faced financial difficulties and students faced hardship due to a plan by the government to increase tuition fees; however, the Union were prevented from making political donations or campaigning due to its status as an education charity. In response, the Union formed the 'Union Club' in 1979 as an independent body which rented a room in the Union building for £1 a year within which it installed pinball tables, football machines, and a jukebox to raise funds. These funds were unrestricted and it was up to the members what the funds could be spent on; by November 1979, it had raised £900. The club existed right into the 21st century with the policy underpinning it only lapsing in 2014.

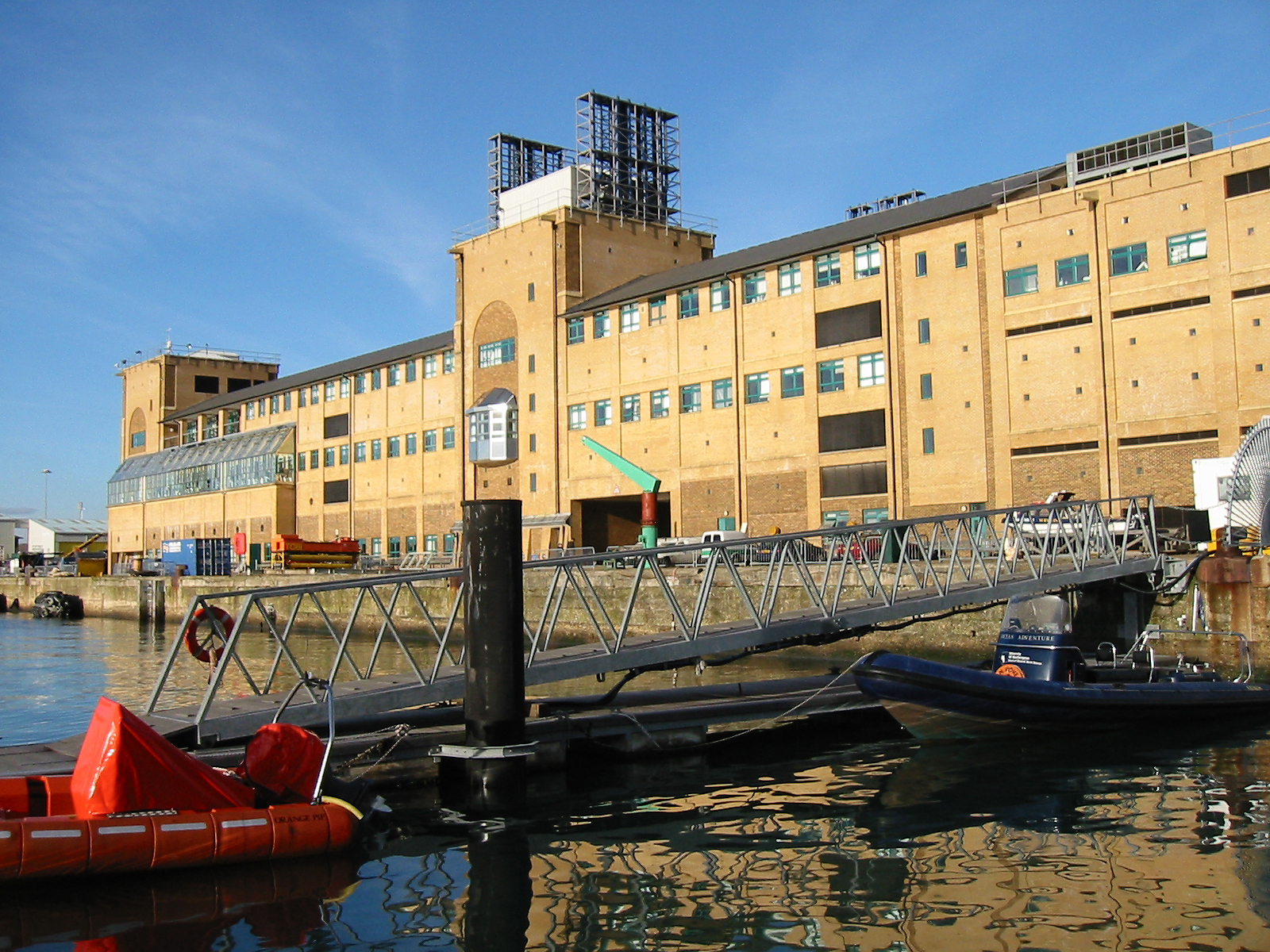
The National Oceanography Centre, one of the new campuses opened in the 1990s.

Through the 1980s and 1990s, the university's student population continued to expand dramatically (from 6,000 in 1980 to 14,000 in 1998) resulting in the university focusing on research and opening other campuses: Avenue Campus, National Oceanography Centre, and Winchester School of Art in 1996, and La Sainte Union College in 1997. With this, the union's operations had to expand to these other campuses to ensure students there were represented and received a suitable university experience, leading to the creation of officers for the different sites. Other key issues during this period included supporting staff in opposing cuts to the university structure in 1981, cuts to the union's funding (calculated by Union president Jon Sopel in 1981 as being 13.4% in two years), proposals from the university to take back part of the Union building for teaching space (which were later withdrawn), introduction of student loans in the late 1980s and throughout the 1990s, and the initial lack of accommodation following the expansion of the university but not of halls accommodation resolved from 1994 to 1998. There were also some minor updates to the Union building with the addition of a Sports bar and an external climbing wall. A bigger change came with the construction of a separate two-storey building in 1996, housing the Students' Union shop on the ground floor with the union travel centre and other businesses above as part of the central communal space outside (known as the 'Redbrick').

=== Early 21st century ===
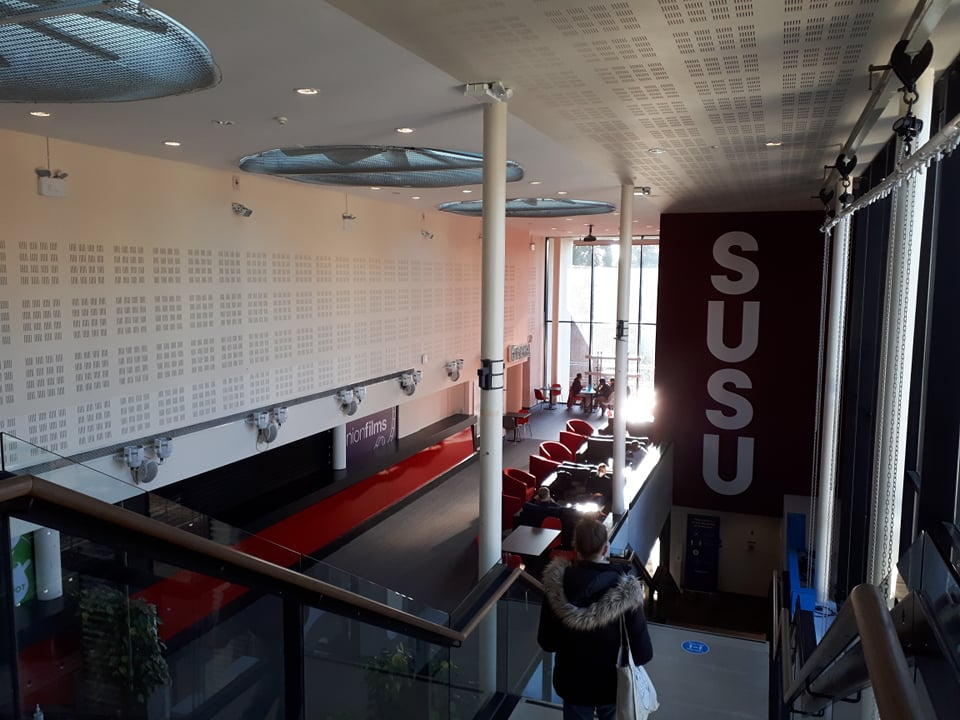
The interior of the Students' Union building extension showing the entrance to the cinema and Bar Three.

With the coming of the new millennium, the Union once again experienced a period of expansion, with 300 clubs and societies being supported by 2019, and the Union's facilities becoming stretched to capacity with large union events, filling the union building's different bars and venues. This led to an extensive programme of works in the main union building costing £3.5 million, replacing the debating chamber with an extension containing a double-height multi-purpose space called 'The Cube' that could be used as a nightclub or as a 330-seat cinema with two bars outside, extra toilets made from a converted squash court, and a refurbishment to the reception and concourse with the ballroom being replaced by a new bar called 'The Bridge' with a view over campus. The building also saw a renovation of the servery for the refectory on Level 3, a new internet cafe off of the refurbished concourse, an overhaul to the building's fire detection and alarm systems, and a new glazed link added to reduce the reliance on the smaller 1960s stairways.

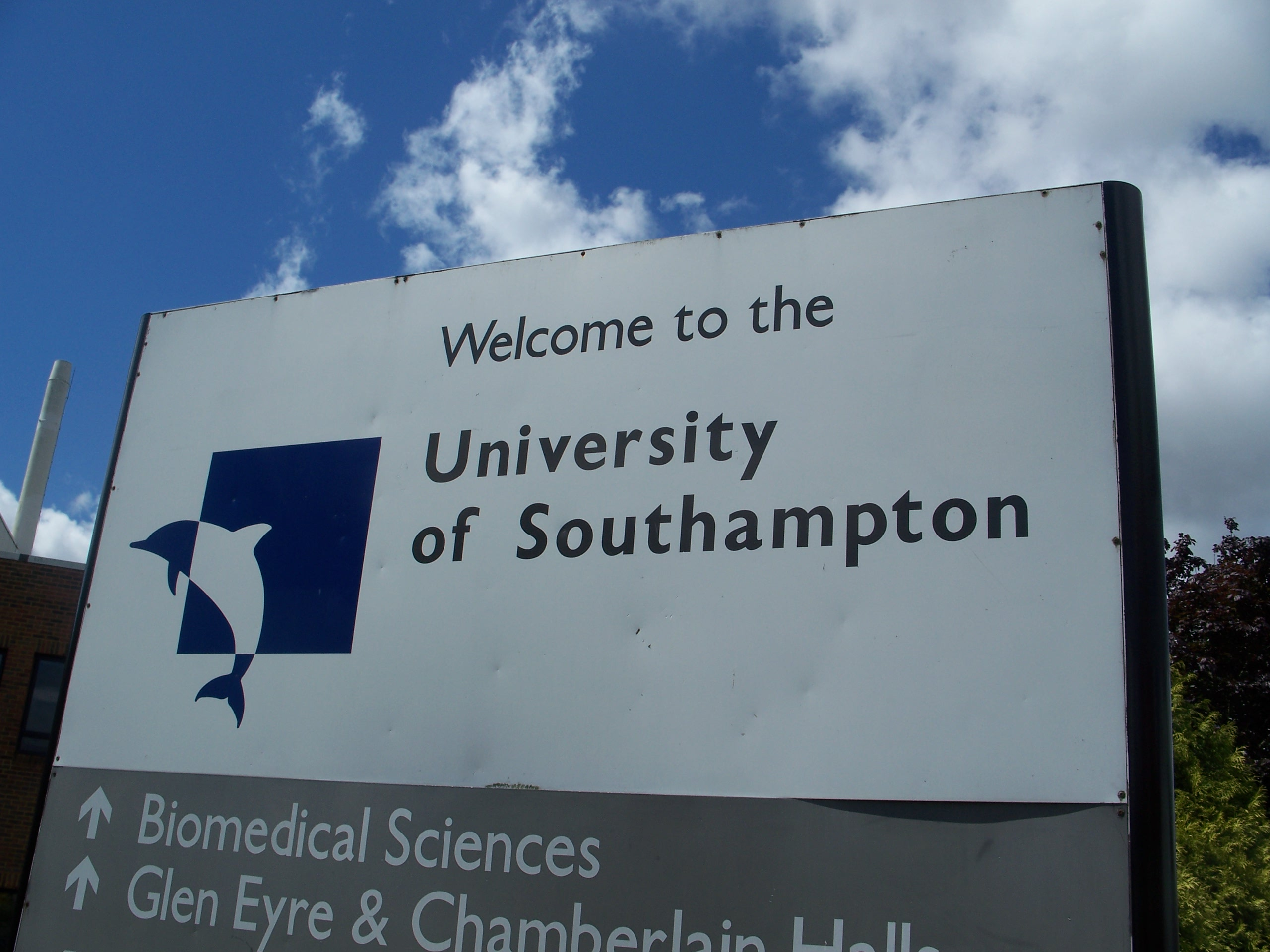
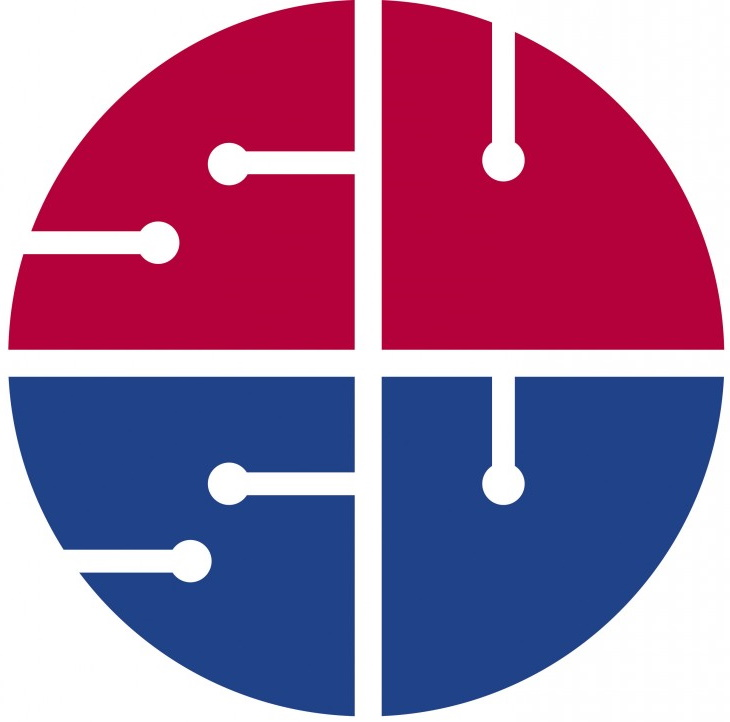
The University of Southampton dolphin logo used 1990-2008 (left) and the Southampton University Students' Union logo used c.2002-2011 (right).

This comprehensive overhaul of the Union building led to a new image for the union and a new logo, based on a segmented circle that could read SUSU when read. The Union was still publicly known by the long name 'Southampton University Students Union' during this period, but with the university very publicly referring to itself as the University of Southampton since the 1990 introduction of their dolphin logo the Union began a period of change, and by 2011, their official name was changed to University of Southampton Students' Union to bring it into line with the university, although the Union was still referred to by the shortened SUSU.

While the union and its members ran fewer protests than in earlier years, there were still occasions for protest and campaigns, on the topics of student loans and fees, climate change, and university strikes. In May 2002, the Union chose to disaffiliate itself from the National Union of Students on the grounds that the organisation was becoming too bureaucratic. Despite referendums in 2010 and 2012 on whether to re-affiliate, this has not happened and the Union remains independent as of 2020.

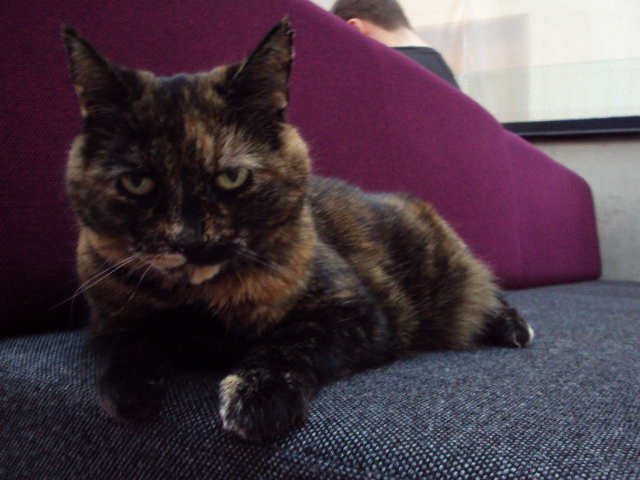
SUSU the Cat, the Union's former pet and mascot.

Towards the end of the decade and the beginning of the 2010s, the Union made a number of improvements to their facilities to modernise them following an increase in competition and expectations of students following the increase of tuition fees in 2012. In 2008, the former Coffee Bar was renovated into 'The Cafe', the concourse entrance was completely renovated during Summer 2011, 'The Bridge' bar updated in Summer 2012, and an American Style Diner created on Bar Three in 2014. The Cube nightclub and Union Films cinema also received an update in 2016 to add a stage area at the front and to replace the seating system so it would become suitable as a lecture theatre space during the day as well. In 2014, the Students Union, in response to student concerns over exploitative lettings agencies in the city, set up a lettings agency to be an approachable and trustworthy example for students to follow, requiring the union to set up a second company, SUSU Social Enterprises, to enable this to happen. SUSU Lettings shut down on 13 June 2024.

In 2016, the student body voted a Tortoiseshell cat into the position of honorary president. She had been a resident of the union building ever since 2002, when she was spotted by porters hanging around the Union looking skinny and dishevelled, leading to them leaving food out for her. The vote to give her the honorary title, awarded only once before to an employee of 30 years to the Union, received national attention. She died the following year and her presence is noted with a plaque in the building.

In 2016, the students' union reviewed its brand and relaunched over the summer as Union Southampton to reconcile the disconnect between the official name of the union and the everyday name and brand. However, reaction from the students was negative and this resulted in the name changing back to the University of Southampton Students' Union or SUSU from summer 2017. The refreshed brand from 2016 was adapted for the change back in name and lasted until 2020, when it was adapted to include symbols for the union's new values. The logo at this time also added the expanded original Southampton University Students' Union name underneath.

As a result of restrictions imposed as a result of the COVID-19 pandemic in the United Kingdom, the Students' Union worked alongside and lobbied the university to ensure the views of students were heard. This included securing funding for an online learning grant to allow students to purchase the necessary equipment to access learning online in April 2020 and October 2020. In January 2022, the Students' Union held an all student vote on whether the university should move examinations online in light of rising COVID-19 cases on campus and in particular with the more transmissible Omicron variant. Despite the vote reaching 30% of the student population and a 95% result calling for exams to be moved online, this result was rejected by the university.

== Organisation ==
=== Membership ===
The Students' Union is a membership organisation that is primarily open to students of the University of Southampton on credit-bearing courses or through studying a higher research degree. Students are automatically enrolled as members of the students' union unless they opt-out of this. Membership continues when students are on years abroad, placement years, or if they are suspended. The union also sells associate membership to partners of students, staff at the University of Southampton, alumni, students at Solent University, and students enrolled on lifelong learning and recovery college programmes.

The students' union does not regularly publish the number of members; the last time was in 2012, when there were 22,269 members of the union, including associate members. As of 2025, the University of Southampton has a student population of 21,179.

=== Governance ===
Foundation in University charter

1.There shall be a Union of Students of the University.
2.Ordinances shall prescribe the constitution functions privileges and other matters relating to the Union of Students.

— Statute 5, University of Southampton Royal Charter

The Union's political oversight body is the Student Council, made up of 26 voting members, including the sabbatical officers, a chair of council, and elected officers and students. The Senate also ensures the Union's 'Memorandum and Articles of Association' and the Union's twelve 'rules' that form the equivalent of a constitution are maintained and upheld.

In October 2020, SUSU launched their new strategy under the new chief executive with a new vision, belief, purpose, values, and mission. With the aim that 'every student loves their time at Southampton', the new strategy sets out the Union's purpose to 'help students form friendship groups, support students to complete their degree programmes and give students a voice in the university and wider community.' Their three values were incorporated into their logo, representing that they will 'Stand Strong' for the voice of students, 'Join Together' to create an inclusive and diverse community, and 'Take Responsibility' for their actions and reduce environmental impact and discrimination.

=== Sabbatical officers ===
SUSU is currently led by five sabbatical officers (sometimes referred to as full-time officers): one president and four vice-presidents, each covering a particular area of the union's activity. They are elected in February or March each year by any full member of the union (all students automatically unless they specifically opt out) and are limited by law to two terms of office. The current team from 1 July 2026 is:

- Union President: Krzysztof Mikulski - liaises with University, leads on development of Union services, sustainability, sites, and halls.
- Vice President Education: Joshie Christian - leads student democracy, represents students academic interests, and ensures that students have a voice in the university and their course.
- Vice President Communities: Harvey Penycate-Smith - represents society interests, supports affiliated societies, and leads on improving access for student groups.
- Vice President Sports: Charlie Bell - developing sporting performance, encouraging participation in sport, and improving the student experience with sport.
- Vice President Inclusion: Annie Whyman- providing support for students in all aspects of their welfare, and representing and supporting underrepresented student communities.

Past Sabbatical Officers
Year	President	VP Activities	VP Education & Democracy	VP Sports	VP Welfare & Community
2025/26	Emma Brown	Ge "Sparkle" Gao	Joshie Christian	Travis Arthur	Toby Page
2024/25	Lawrence Coomber	Emily Dugdale	Rebecca Would	Conor White	Charlotte "Lottie" James
2023/24	Edward "Ed" Brooker	Amy Moir	Rebecca Would	Marina Stasi	Unfilled
2022/23	Oliver Murray	Zoe Chapple	Emily Bastable	Casie Osborne	Aycha Ates-Di Adamo
2021/22	Benjamin "Ben" Dolbear	Ella Foxhall	Charlotte "Lottie" James	Matthew Smith	Savanna Cutts
2020/21	Olivia Reed	Corin Holloway	Avila Chidume	Samuel "Sam" Tweedle	Nicole Azkuezumba
2019/20	Emily Harrison	Fiona Sunderland	Joanne "Jo" Lisney	Olivia Reed	Laura "Elizabeth" Barr

There were also at least 3 years where there were seven sabbatical officer roles.

Past Sabbatical Officers
Year	President	VP Education	VP Welfare	VP Communities	VP Sports	VP Democracy and Creative Industries	VP Engagement
2018/19	Emily Dawes (resigned)	Samuel "Sam" Dedman	Isabella Camilleri	Emily Harrison	Stephen "Steve" Gore	Evie Reilly	Fleur Walsh
2017/18	Flora Noble	Samuel "Sam" Dedman	Samantha "Sam" Higman	Arun Aggarwal	Stephen "Steve" Gore	Evie Reilly	
2016/17	Alex Hovden	Elliot Grater	David Allwright	Flora Noble	Tom Provan	Cameron Meldrum	Dan Varley

=== Student leaders ===
In addition to the sabbatical officers, there are also student leaders who represent one particular area of Union activity such as the creative outlets, particular student activities, or a particular group of students. As of June 2023, there are officer positions for:

- Arts and Humanities Faculty Officer
- Arts and Humanities Postgraduate Research Officer
- Arts and Humanities Sustainability Representative
- Athletic Union Officer
- Avenue Officer
- BAME Officer
- Boldrewood Officer
- Disabilities Officer
- Engineering and Physical Sciences Faculty Officer
- Engineering and Physical Sciences Sustainability Representative
- Enterprise Officer
- Environment and Life Sciences Faculty Officer
- Environment and Life Sciences Postgraduate Research Officer
- Environmental and Life Sciences Sustainability Representative
- Halls Officer
- International Officer
- Intramural Officer
- Joint Honours Officer
- LGBT+ Officer
- Medicine Faculty Officer
- Medicine Postgraduate Research Officer
- Medicine Sustainability Representative
- NOCS Officer
- Performing Arts Officer
- Social Science Postgraduate Research Officer
- Social Sciences Faculty Officer
- Sports Participation Officer
- Sustainability Officer
- Team Southampton Sports Officer
- Wellbeing Officer
- Women Officer
- WSA Officer

=== Staff ===
The union's student officers are supported by a team of around 65 core staff and hundreds of support staff, which are mostly filled by current students at the university. The day-to-day operations are split into five directorates (operations, people, membership services, student voice, commercial services) led by the chief executive who, since October 2022, has been Sonia Cottrell. Whereas the student body makes its contribution to the direction of the Union through Union Senate, the staff and strategic direction are scrutinised by the Trustee Board, composed of four Sabbatical trustees, four student trustees, and four external trustees who all act as directors of the limited company and trustees of the charity.

== Facilities ==
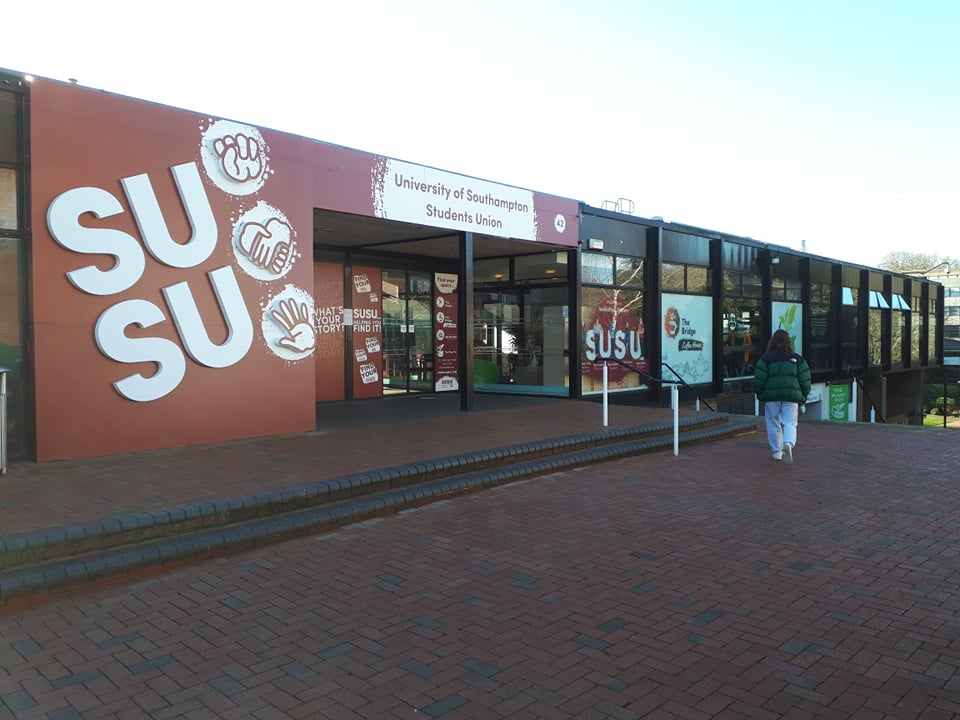
Entrance to Building 42, the Union's main building.

SUSU has a range of facilities located on the Highfield campus and on the Winchester School of Art campus. The Union's Highfield buildings are arranged around a central plaza, named after the red brick paving of the area. It is frequently used by the Union to host events, for fundraising events, and to hold the weekly market.

The main Union building, Building 42, is spread over four levels and contains: 'The Bridge' coffee shop; the 'Plant Pot', which offers sustainable vegan and vegetarian cuisine; meeting and activity rooms; 'The Cube' nightclub and bars, which doubles as the Union Films cinema; and sports facilities, including a sports hall, squash courts, judo room, indoor climbing wall, and dance studio. In addition to the main building, the Union also has part use of the three storey West Building, Building 40, which contains the offices of the Sabbatical Officers, and hosts the pub 'The Stags Head' (shortened to 'The Stag's'), activity spaces, and the Advice Centre. The final building is the Union retail centre, containing the Union shop on the ground floor, the Union-run 'Shop on Top' clothing and gift shop above, alongside a hairdressers and the Unilink travel centre.

The Union also has a presence at the Winchester School of Art campus in the form of a permanent Winchester Manager and a space in the WSA Cafe that is shared with the university.

== Union and student groups ==
The Union plays a major role in the social activity of the students from the university and the organisations and societies it supports are a key part of this. The union supports (as of October 2020) 266 societies and 90 sports clubs through its Athletic Union branch and allows students to create new societies if there is not one already existing that serves that purpose. An example is CASHES, the Consent Awareness and Sexual Health Education Society. These include 41 Performing Arts societies grouped under this umbrella brand, a RAG (Raise and Give) society to raise money for local and national charities, and operates Community Volunteering and Action programmes.

=== Media ===
The union operates four media outlets as Union groups. They are all student-led and receive a budget from the Union and while one of the sabbatical officers is declared editor in chief of the outlets, they are given editorial independence from the Union and are free to criticise their operation.

- The Wessex Scene is a student magazine published eight - twelve times a year and kept updated through their online website. Starting out in 1936 as the Wessex News and renamed in 1996, the newspaper continues to gain writers and has had articles showcased in the national press. They are a founder member of the Student Publication Association and have won numerous awards including Guardian Student Media Awards and Student Publication Association Awards.
- Surge Radio broadcasts from studios inside the main Union building over the internet and on FM during key dates in the year such as during Freshers' week and the Union Elections. Created in 1976, it has won multiple awards including 11 Gong awards. It is run by president Byron Lewis and currently features radio shows such as 'Dance Bangers with Bilaal' on Mondays from 2pm.
- Internet television station SURGEtv broadcasts a wide range of programmes live and on demand through their website. Started in 2007 and broadcasting in HD three years later, the service has been awarded several student level awards for their broadcasting achievements.
- The Edge entertainment magazine began life as an insert of the Wessex Scene in 1995 before growing to become a full publication and online presence in 2011. The magazine contains reviews of films, music, and theatre, as well as interviews with celebrities from the film and music world.

=== Cinema ===
The Union contains a 300-seat cinema in the 2002 extension to the Union, which is run by student-led union group Union Films. Staffed completely by student volunteers, Union Films operates the setting up the cinema, selling of refreshments, publicising of events, and projecting of films. The group is equipped with 35mm and DCI projection capabilities, allowing them to screen films in 3D.

=== Performing Arts ===
The Performing Arts brand is used to represent the 41 societies that include music, dance, and drama in their remit. They share a common representative (the Performing Arts officer) and committee and often share their own individual society branding with that of the Performing Arts umbrella brand. The brand is also used for ticketing with a Performing Arts pass available to get students into performances by any of the societies. In addition to the performance aspect, the brand also includes StageSoc, who operate back-stage and with the technical services department.

The Union does not have any designated Performing Arts space on campus, with the acting societies primarily using The Annex theatre complex, which double as lecture theatres during the day.

=== Sports ===
The Union supports both the Athletic Union and Intra-Mural leagues at the university. The AU comprises over 90 sports teams at the university as well as providing them with access to union minibuses and subsidised 'Team Southampton' sports wear. The teams use both university facilities at Wide Lane, the Jubilee Sports Hall, and the boating hard, but also the Union's own sports hall, squash courts, martial arts room, and rock climbing wall. Societies compete in national British Universities and Colleges Sport tournaments and in the annual Varsity cup match between the University of Southampton and the University of Portsmouth.

== Controversies ==
=== National Union of Students affiliation ===
For a sizable length of its existence, the union was associated with the National Union of Students (NUS), however in May 2002, the union chose to disaffiliate itself from the NUS on the grounds that the organisation was becoming too bureaucratic. Being one of the few to do this, the Union wrote into policy that the union should help others looking to disaffiliate and also continue to monitor the situation.

The decision was controversial among students and attempts have been made on a number of occasions to consult students on whether to re-join the NUS following perceived changes in the organisation and in the benefits of affiliation. Student referendums held in December 2010 and again in December 2012 to whether the union should re-affiliate with the NUS led on both occasions to a negative result with the 2010 result totalling 67% against the affiliation, and 73% against it in 2012.

=== Rebranding ===
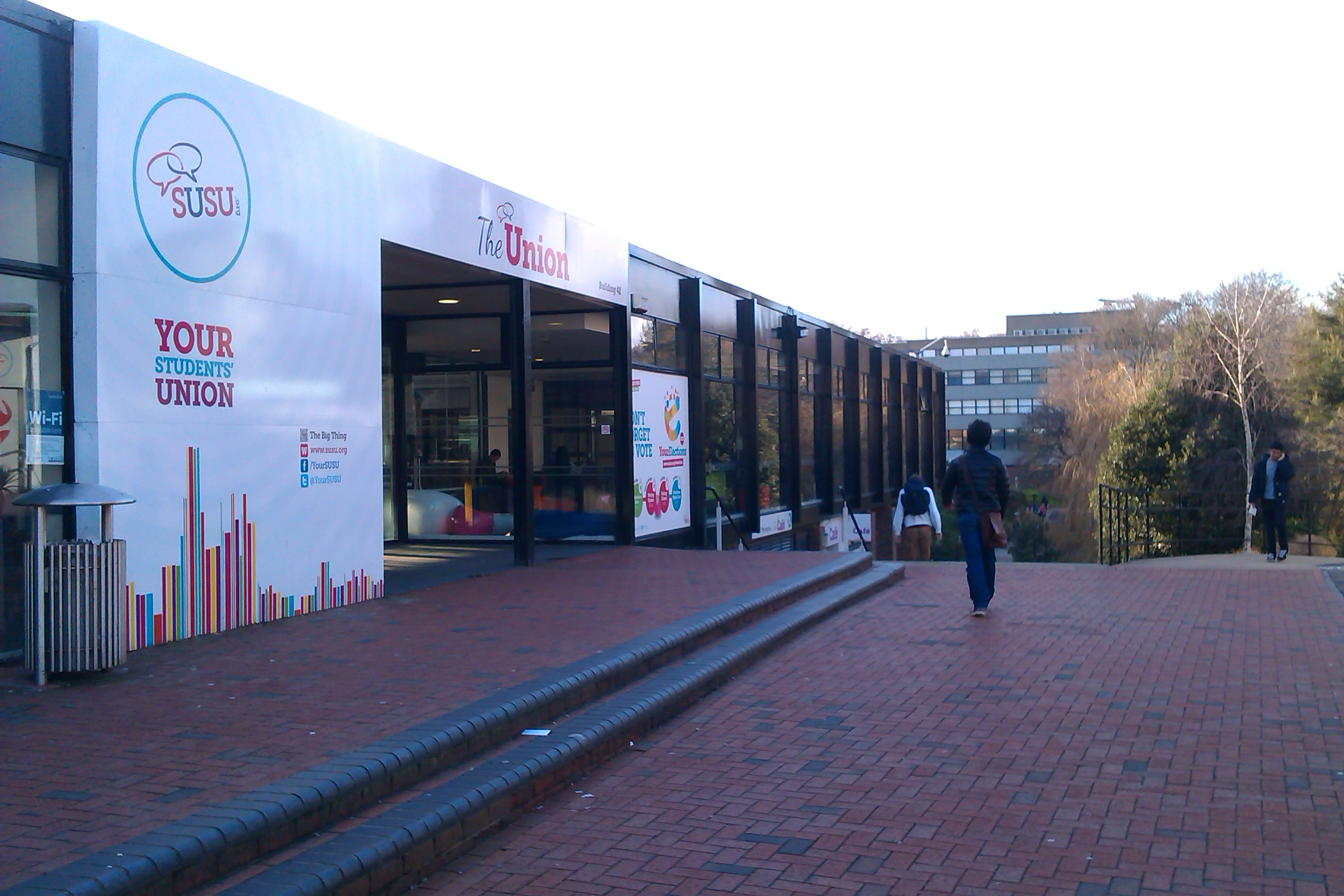
The entrance to the Students' Union seen in 2013 with the former logo visible.

For much of its history, the union has used the abbreviation SUSU as its name, short for the original name Southampton University Students' Union, while its official name is the University of Southampton Students' Union. To combat falling satisfaction with the union and to address a brand that was difficult for the union's staff to apply, they approached Holden's design agency who had worked on The Union MMU. The surveys they completed concluded that the perception of the union was full of contradictions and that the vast majority were indifferent to the union, which they concluded was worse than negative. When they looked into the name, they concluded that affection for the name SUSU grew over time and that the name was seen initially as childish, weird, incorrect, and rude when translated into other languages. Furthermore, the current brand was deemed problematic as there were so many sub-brands that many students engaged with the union in some way (such as sports or clubs) but did not understand they were part of the union.

Of the three options presented (The Union Southampton, Union of Southampton and Union Southampton), the third option was chosen, as the union subsequently changed its trading name to Union Southampton, which was stylised as Us. in May 2016. The name included a circular mark afterwards, which could be adapted including for sub-brands to raise awareness of the different things the union does (places, representation, support and opportunities). The abbreviation Us. was also chosen to help encourage a shared culture.

Although the change of name had been announced by the Wessex Scene in March, the £29,000 rebrand was widely revealed by the Soton Tab on Saturday 14 May when new signage was installed on the union buildings. The reaction to the signage, black and white in colour without the context of the rest of the brand and look, was negative ('corporate and unfeeling') and a petition to reverse it was launched within an hour. Although the rest of the brand was due to be released on Monday 16 May, it was leaked on Sunday 15th to the Wessex Scene.

The strength of feeling led to an open meeting (which revealed 40.5% approval for the name SUSU, 9.6% against and 49.9% indifferent) and with the petition that gained 1,813 signatures on Change.org and further successful petition on the union's website, in the autumn, an all student vote took place on the rebrand. Two questions were asked, whether students preferred the name SUSU or Union Southampton (Us.) and whether they preferred the old SUSU branding or the new Us. branding. With a turnout of 4831, students voted in favour of the name SUSU (by 3328 to 1407 votes) and the new Union Southampton branding (by 2557 to 2154 votes). Thus the branding was redesigned to incorporate the SUSU name and rolled out in June 2017 following a student vote on the final design.

=== Threat to remembrance mural ===
In October 2018, the president of the Students' Union, Emily Dawes, sparked national outrage when she called for a mural dedicated to the memory of war heroes to be painted over. The mural, which is displayed in the university's senate room, was painted by William Rothenstein in 1916 and depicts a degree being bestowed on an unknown soldier. This references the students who had been called up and could not complete their studies or collect their degrees. It was put on display by the University of Southampton in 2014 to serve as a memorial to all members of British universities who died in World War I.

Following a union meeting in the university senate room, Dawes tweeted on 24 October 'Mark my words - we're taking down the mural of white men in the uni Senate room, even if I have to paint over it myself'. The tweet gained over 1,600 comments before being deleted and a petition calling for her resignation received 21,000 signatures. The university's statement made it clear the comments were not representative of the wider student population and that the students' union were following up the incident. The following day the union apologised for the statement of their president and that it did not follow their values and Dawes, after initially defending her opinions, apologised saying 'My intention was to promote strong, female leadership and not the eradication and disrespect of history. I do not believe that to make progress in the future, we should look to erase the past'. In addition to gathering widespread attention, the story also hit headlines as far afield as Australia and Canada.

The following month, after a term of absence, Dawes resigned from her role as president of the union and was not replaced that academic year.

=== Protests and sit-ins ===
In common with other students' unions of the period, during the 1960s and 70s, the union and its members undertook a number of protests and sit-ins on a variety of different scales form international to local.

During the 1960s, documents record a number of protests at a local level including boycott of the university refectory over the quality of the food, protesting the right of Sikhs to wear a turban as part of their uniform, and standing in solidarity with striking workers at the Ford Southampton plant. Protesting students in Berlin in June 1967, students and workers opposing Gaullism in France in May 1968, and imprisoned intellectuals in the Soviet Union in June 1968 all received union support and in 1969, it banned Enoch Powell from appearing at the Union. Two sit-ins also took place in the late 1960s, both at the administration offices of the university: the first, in February 1968, lasted 24 hours when 50 students sat in support of students at the London School of Economics, which put the telephone exchange out of action but caused no other damage; the second was in June 1969 for 38 hours by 60 students over the number of students required to resit exams that year. A sit-in in 1971 took place in central Southampton, where three derelict or vacant houses were occupied by students in protest of the shortage in university accommodation.

A more significant protest took place in March 1970 when students organised a sit-in at the Nuffield Theatre for ten days in protest at the appointment of a Dr. W. A. Coupe as a professor of German. Regardless, the University Senate confirmed Coupe's appointment and in February 1971, students on the German course occupied the Arts 1 building that adjoined the Nuffield Theatre for 24 hours before occupying the theatre itself for another 10 days. The protest led to changes in the appointment process to remove students from panels, confirming the university (not the department) leads appointments, and to the creation of the staff voice publication Viewpoint.

== See also ==
- University of Southampton
- National Union of Students (United Kingdom)
- Student unionism in the United Kingdom
