= Race Relations (Amendment) Act 2000 =

Act of the Parliament of the United Kingdom

Race Relations (Amendment) Act 2000 (Note: Section 10(1).)
- Act of Parliament
- Parliament of the United Kingdom
- Long title: An Act to extend further the application of the Race Relations Act 1976 to the police and other public authorities; to amend the exemption under that Act for acts done for the purpose of safeguarding national security; and for connected purposes.
- Citation: 2000 c. 34
- Territorial extent: United Kingdom

Dates
- Royal assent: 30 November 2000
- Commencement: Various (Note: Section 10(2). The Race Relations (Amendment) Act 2000 (Commencement) Order 2001.)
- Repealed: England and Wales and Scotland: 1 October 2010
Other legislation
Amends	Race Relations Act 1976; Education (Scotland) Act 1980; Government of Wales Act 1998; Education Act 1994
Repealed by	England and Wales and Scotland: Equality Act 2010

Status: Repealed

Text of statute as originally enacted

Revised text of statute as amended

The Race Relations (Amendment) Act 2000 (c. 34) was an act of the Parliament of the United Kingdom that modified the earlier Race Relations Act 1976.

== Background ==
The act came about due to proposals made in the MacPherson report.

== Provisions ==
The legislation outlawed race discrimination in areas not covered by the 1976 legislation. This included the introduction of a broader definition of "public authorities" to cover public functions performed by private organisations. Furthermore it required public authorities to promote racial equality. The Commission for Racial Equality became empowered to inspect organisations' race policies.

The act provided a new definition of indirect discrimination, which is when a "provision, criterion or practice" of the employer is applicable to all staff but particularly disadvantages a person of one ethnic or racial group at a particular disadvantage when compared with other employees.

Finally, government ministers could no longer issue conclusive certificates in cases of racial discrimination by claiming given acts of race discrimination were not unlawful because they were done for the purposes of national security.
