= Training and Development Agency for Schools =

Defunct teacher training program

The Training and Development Agency for Schools (TDA) was a body responsible for the initial and in-service training of teachers and other school staff in England. It was an executive non-departmental public body of the Department for Education. The agency took on some operations of the General Teaching Council for England, the Qualifications and Curriculum Development Agency and the Children's Workforce Development Council as the newly established Teaching Agency in April 2012.

The TDA was established as the Teacher Training Agency (TTA) by the Education Act 1994 and was relaunched as the TDA by the Education Act 2005.
