= Wessex Scene =

Student news magazine of the University of Southampton

- Type: Student online newspaper and published magazine
- Format: Compact
- Owner: University of Southampton Students' Union
- Editor: James Hurford
- Deputy editor: Anton Allegranza Quicke
- Founded: 1936
- Political alignment: Independent
- Headquarters: Wessex Scene, University of Southampton Students' Union, Building 42, Highfield, Southampton, SO17 1BJ
- City: Southampton
- Country: United Kingdom
- Circulation: 100,000 unique monthly visitors (est.)
- Sister newspapers: The Edge
- Website: wessexscene.co.uk

Wessex Scene is a student news magazine and website serving the students of the University of Southampton. Having been in print continuously since 1936, it is one of the oldest student publications in the United Kingdom.

Wessex Scene now takes the forms of an online news site and a monthly printed magazine, published by the University of Southampton Students' Union and available across the campuses and Halls of Residence of the university. The website and online edition were nominated for best website at the Guardian Student Media Awards for three years in a row before winning the award in 2004. Since its establishment in 2013, Wessex Scene has been nominated for dozens of Student Publication Association awards, and was highly commended for "Best Designed magazine" in 2015. The team at the magazine have also won a number of individual nationally recognised awards. In 2014, a piece by Bridie Pearson-Jones, then politics editor, was selected as one of The Huffington Post "Student Journalist Stories of the Year", and in 2015 Toby Leveson was awarded "New Deal Student Journalist of the Year" by The Independent and National Union of Students for his coverage of the 2015 United Kingdom general election. In 2018, Wessex Scene won jointly with the Edge "Best Collaboration" at SPARC (Student Publication Association Regional Conference) for a collaborative magazine focussing on the topic of mental health. In 2021, Wessex Scene were named the "Best Publication in the South East" at the Student Publication Association Regional Conference.

== History ==
The Wessex Scene initially began as Wessex News on 25 February 1936, and was published by students Union of the, then, University College. The Union had at this time just been granted a section of the main University building following new construction work and as a result had begun to expand in operations. From this foundation the paper was printed regularly in newspaper format with relatively few changes. The name changed to the current Wessex Scene in 1996 to reflect on the other content that was being fed into the paper and the publication launched online in the 2001 academic year.

The publication's ownership by the Students' Union has resulted in conflict at times between the student writers and editors of the publication, and the officers at the Union who are also Editors-in-chief but who have a minimal role. This has led to claims of censorship and that the Union blocked stories that they believed did not fit with the values of the Union. Subsequently, a Code of Conduct was written for the writers of the publication to adhere to.

In 2013 the Wessex Scene and The Edge became founding members of the Student Publication Association. The association was founded as a result of the efforts of David Gilani, the Vice-President Communications at the Students' Union and Editor-in-chief of both publications at the time. SUSU and the two publications hosted the first conference in April 2013 and also hosted the 2015 conference.

=== Notable ex-writers ===
- Jason Cowley (Editor, New Statesman)
- John Denham (UK politician)
- John Inverdale (BBC)
- Dominic Mohan (Editor, The Sun)
- John Sopel (BBC)
- Alan Whitehead (UK politician)

== Editorial team ==
The Scene is run by an editorial team headed by the Editor-in-Chief, currently James Hurford for 2023-2024 academic year, who is elected by the members and whose term covers the mention academic. Part of the Creative Industries Zone of the Students' Union, the work of the publication is overseen by the Vice-President Activities Industries, the Sabbatical officer in charge of the zone who acts as Editor-in-chief, currently Corin Holloway. The editor is supported by a Deputy Editor, currently Anton Allegranza Quicke for 2023-2024 academic year, and a team of editors each overseeing all of the sections of the publication of News & Investigations, Features, Creative Writing, Politics, Opinion, Pause (Satire), Lifestyle, Science and Technology, Travel, International, and Sport. There are further positions as the Heads of Design, Marketing, Events and Imagery.

== The Edge ==
The Edge
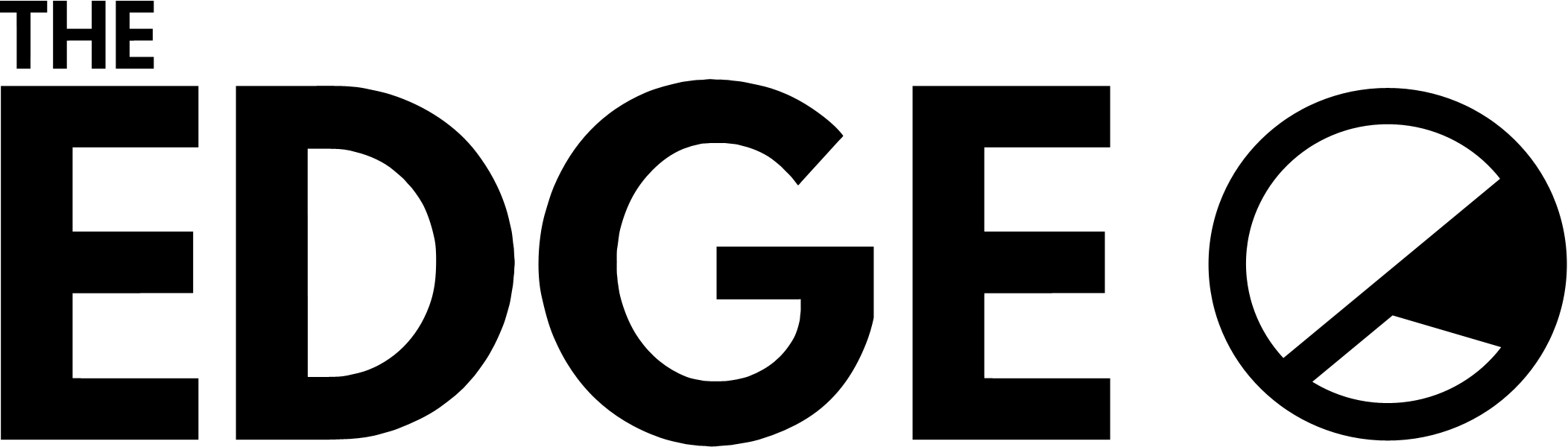
- Editor: Rosie Spurrier
- Deputy: Kye Preston
- Frequency: Monthly
- Publisher: University of Southampton Students' Union
- Founded: 1995 / 2011
- Country: United Kingdom
- Based in: University of Southampton
- Website: theedgesusu.co.uk

The Edge is the University of Southampton's entertainment publication. Originally created in 1995 as a supplement of the Wessex Scene, The Edge has been published independently since Autumn 2011, and is its own distinct department of the Students' Union. Online content is published regularly each day, and eight print issues are published per year.

The Edge focuses on entertainment news and reviews; it covers union, local and national theatre/live music, and release of records, film and television. In 2014, The Edge won the award for Best Design at the annual Student Publication Awards, and in 2015 Records Editor Hannah Mylrea won highly commended in the Best Entertainment Piece category.

=== Editorial Team ===
The Editorial Team of The Edge includes an overall Editor (as of 2024/25, Rosie Spurrier), a Deputy Editor, Section Editors, and Department Heads, including Design and Publicity.

As defined by the society Constitution, the position of Editor is a 'Student Leader' position, and is decided in cross-campus elections by the Students' Union in early Spring, in the main elections period for the Union. The remainder of the committee is decided at the publication's AGM each year, in around late April. There are currently Editors for News, Records, Live, Film, and Culture, and positions for Fundraising, Events and Publicity officers, Design, two PR officers and an Online Manager. Executive positions are decided on a year-by-year basis. The work of the publication forms part of the Union's Creative Industries Zone, and is overseen by the Vice-President Activities who, for 2023/24, is Amy Moir.

==== Editors ====
| Name | Year |
|---|---|
| Joe Hawkes | 2011-12 |
| David Martin | 2012-13 |
| Megan Downing | 2013-14 |
| Rebecca James | 2014-15 |
| Natalie Fordham | 2015-16 |
| Anneka Honeyball | 2016-17 |
| James Barker | 2017-18 |
| Thea Hartman | 2018-19 |
| Jack Nash | 2019-20 |
| Morgan McMillan | 2020-21 |
| Sam Pegg | 2021-22 |
| Amy Scott-Munden | 2022-23 |
| Callum Joynes | 2023-24 |
| Rosie Spurrier | 2024-25 |

== See also ==
- Surge (radio station)
- SUSUtv
