= The Union MMU =

Students' union of Manchester Metropolitan University

- Institution: Manchester Metropolitan University
- Location: Oxford Road, Manchester, England
- Established: 1970 (as Manchester Polytechnic Students' Union)
- President: George Charlton
- Trustees: Sabbatical officers plus five external trustees
- Members: c. 44,000 (2026/27)
- Affiliations: NUS, NUSSL, AMSU
- Website: theunionmmu.org

The Union MMU is the students' union of Manchester Metropolitan University, an institution of higher education and research in North West England. Named MMUnion until August 2014; Manchester Metropolitan Students' Union (MMSU) until July 2005; and Manchester Polytechnic Students' Union (MPSU) before the institution gained its university status in 1992.

The union has one building on the All Saints campus in Manchester, after the Crewe campus closed its doors in Cheshire in 2019. The union is affiliated to the National Union of Students (NUS).

The union has an independent advice centre available for all students at the university, as well as an activities centre for the sports clubs and societies at MMU.

== Governance ==
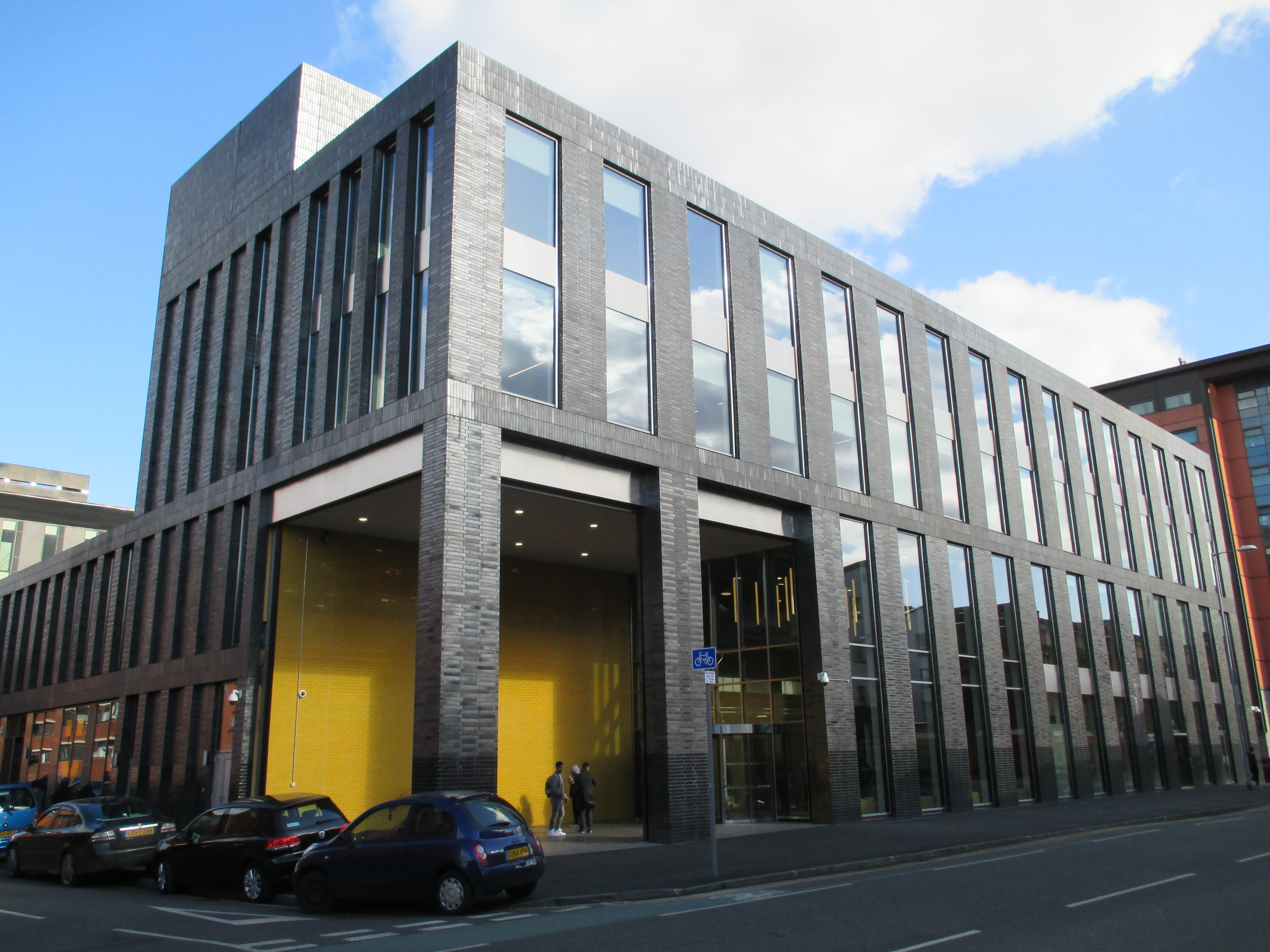
The Union MMU

The Union is controlled by the Union Officers Group formed of five current students and graduates of the university, elected by the students to control the union on their behalf.

=== Structure pre 2008 Governance Review ===
Prior to the 2008 review of the union's governance structures, there were 17 executive officers each with their own areas of responsibility in addition to acting in the interests of the union as a whole.

Seven of the officers were sabbaticals. Two sabbaticals based in MMU Cheshire and the other five in Manchester. The 10 remaining officers were based across both campuses, were non-sabbaticals and studied during their term in office receiving no payment.

The union's sovereign body was Student Council, to which all committees, representatives and officers, either directly or indirectly, were answerable. The Student Council, chaired by an independent non-executive student, was composed of the executive committee and students elected from each faculty of the university. The chair and vice-chair of the Athletic Unions, and one representative of each Societies Union were ex officio members of the council.

=== Structure from 2009 ===
==== Board of trustees ====
From the start of 2009, the highest level of governance has been the Board of Trustees, composed of the sabbatical officers and up to four external trustees, and one co-opted trustee.; The Trustee Board has the ability to call binding referendums on issues and motions as it sees fit; referendums may also be called by students directly by secure petition.

==== Union Officers Group ====
Policy decisions are made by the Union Officers Group, which meets weekly. The Union Officers Group consists of five sabbatical officers (currently made up of a President, Education Officer, Sports Officer, Wellbeing Officer and Societies and Development Officer), as of the 2025/26 academic year.

== Sports and societies ==
The union supports current students to manage and run all the official sports clubs and societies at the university. There is a range of societies on offer, covering a variety of different groups including academic, campaigning and liberation, faith, hobbies and interests, media, music and performance, nationality and culture and political perspectives.

== Hive Radio ==
Student media is an expanding area of the union. Hive Radio, MMU's student radio station, is an active society, using its resources within the university and their technical ability to help promote their own activity, as well as expand into other areas of interest, such as sports commentating, radio dramas, and online journalism through the Hive Radio website reviewing music events & performances in Manchester and surrounding areas, films, and other issues of interest.

== Campaigns ==
=== The Real Cost ===
In 2012, the union launched 'The Real Cost' campaign. This is based around students being given the real cost upfront of being a student at MMU and revealing everything considered a 'hidden cost', including things such as workbooks, club and society memberships, printing and technical supplies. The union is currently looking at working with MMU to banish these to allow MMU students better control of their finances.

=== Exam locations ===
In recent years the union has successfully campaigned against business school exams being held in a tent, and supported Shayne Ward on his way to winning The X Factor. It also started a scheme of co-operative housing for students in Manchester.

=== Access privileges ===
The union also successfully lobbied for access privileges to be reinstated, for students of MMU, at the John Rylands University Library of the University of Manchester.

=== Bursaries ===
In 2008, The union campaigned on the £2.7 million of bursaries that the university predicted to, but had not, paid out to its students in the last year. This is part of a wider campaign on education funding and the union is supporting and promoting the National Union of Students' Broke & Broken campaign.

=== Library access ===
The union won a campaign in 2008 to extend the library hours until midnight and is currently working on to make 24-hour computer drop-in-centre available for students.

=== LGBTQ+ access to blood donations ===
The union, together with the MMU LGBT society and the National Union of Students, are running the Please Give Blood Because I Can't campaign, lobbying and demonstrating against the National Blood Service's lifetime ban on gay and bisexual men from giving blood. They are running a series of demonstrations in Manchester city centre to raise awareness and encourage people to give blood on behalf of a healthy gay man who cannot, in which the president of the union and chair of the Student Council gave blood. Debates are also being held on the issue.

=== Late campaign ===
In autumn 2008 the union launched the Late Campaign after consultation with Course Reps, who expressed concern that students were suffering because of late and cancelled lectures that were never rearranged - The Late Campaign was organised to find out how many students across MMU were finding this to be the case.

=== Exam timetables ===
The University Student Agreement (the statement that the University agreed would be the principles of an MMU education) says that "staff will give reasonable notice of changes to the teaching timetable and will arrange for classes to be rescheduled or for alternative delivery of the content, or will explain why this is not possible." The union has stated they "think that this is the best way to test whether that's actually happening and to help identify where there are problem areas." "This is a variation on traditional course rep activity, collecting information in a way that is easier for modern students. We fully understand that lectures may need to be cancelled and re-arranged for legitimate reasons and believe that it is crucial to establish a means of measuring the impact of cancelled lectures. We have faith that the results will demonstrate the professional approach adopted by the majority of staff" Nicola Lee, President

=== COVID-19 campaigns ===
In 2021, the union announced four key campaigns in response to the COVID-19 pandemic, these included 'Students have a right to a reduction in tuition fees', 'Students have a right to some form of rent rebate', 'Students have a right to quality online teaching' and 'Students have a right to increased access to mental health support'.

== Union building ==
The union has a presence and building on the MMU campus. Originally occupying the Righton Building on the corner of Cavendish Street and Lower Ormond Street, the union moved in 1982 to a purpose-built building at 99 Oxford Road. The new building was opened by Bobby Charlton and in 1984 it was named the Mandela Building after Winnie Mandela, during the ANC Year of the Woman. Following the death of Stompie Moeketsi in 1989, an event with which Winnie Mandela was linked, moves were made to change the name to something less controversial and for a time it was named the Bruce Forsyth building after the popular entertainer. The name was dropped shortly after.

A Barclays Bank mini-branch was opened in the building shortly after the bank had cut its links with apartheid South Africa, following an NUS lead campaign.

The union's facilities were arranged over four floors and included;

- Ground Floor; Reception, Barclays ATM, The Union Shop, Icycle and the Student Officers Office.
- First Floor; "The met" union bar and club, opened in September 2009, formerly K2 nightclub.
- Second Floor; Student Activities Centre, the VP Student Activities office and campaigns, societies and students open space.
- Third Floor; Student Advice Centre, accredited as a Community Legal Service. Union Administration, Finance Office, Committee Meeting Rooms and Conference Facilities.

In January 2015, the union moved to a new purpose-built building on the All Saints campus, directly adjacent to the University's Cambridge and Cavendish Halls of Residence, on Cambridge Street, next to the Salutation pub, which the union now runs. The new building incorporates a dance studio, radio studio, media suite, and conferencing facilities, a Starbucks and a shop, as well as a new large open multi-purpose space which is used for club nights, fashion shows, freshers and refreshers fairs and also stalls and campaigns when required.
