= Dundee University Students' Association =

Students' union in the UK

Coordinates: 56°27′27.6″N 2°58′55.8″W

- Institution: University of Dundee
- Location: Airlie Place, Dundee, Scotland, UK
- Established: 1903
- President: Tánaiste Custance
- Members: c. 17,000
- Affiliations: Coalition of Higher Education Students in Scotland, National Postgraduate Committee, British University Sports Association
- Website: www.dusa.co.uk

Dundee University Students' Association (DUSA) is the students' association, legal representative and students' union for matriculated students of the University of Dundee. It is known locally as 'The Union'.

Membership of the body is automatic for all students of the university, although it is possible under statutes to renounce this membership at any time. The Dundee University Students' Association, as with its neighbours in the other ancient-organised universities in Scotland, is co-existent with the university's students' representative council.

== Facilities ==
The DUSA building is located in Airlie Place, in the centre of the university's Main Campus and caters as a private members' club offering bar, nightclub and refectory services for many students, particularly undergraduates. It is also responsible for the operation of a number of small shops throughout the university's campuses. In 2004, it underwent major refurbishment work. This included adding a new nightclub, and redesigning the interiors of the bars and recreational spaces. The building also contains the university's main swimming pool. DUSA also provides a number of other typical students' union services such as advocacy on behalf of its membership and assistance to individual students.

The largest of the buildings four bars is located on level three, and is known as The Liar. It takes its name from the novel of the same name written by former Rector Stephen Fry.

The building also contains a grocery shop of the Premier franchise, of which all profits are given to DUSA.

== History of the Association ==
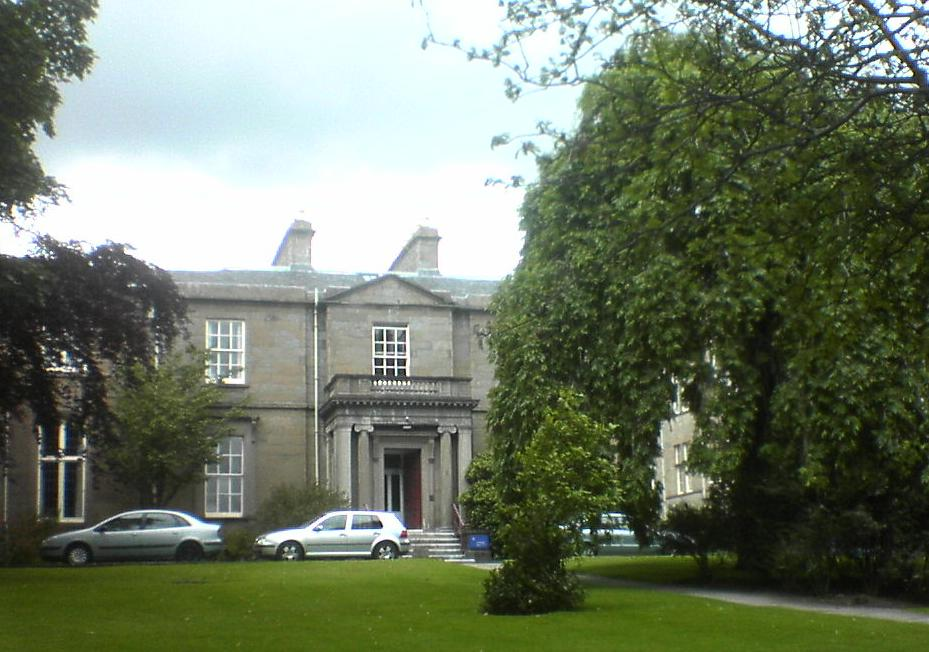
Ellenbank, former home of the Students' Association

The Students' Association was founded by the merger in 1969 of the Students' Union and students' representative council (SRC). Both bodies had existed since the University of Dundee's period as a college of the University of St Andrews. The Dundee Students' Union was mainly responsible for meeting the physical needs of students, and ran a bar, shop, and launderette. There were two restaurants: Old Dines, located in the Ellenbank building, and New Dines, built in 1963. The SRC handled other aspects of student welfare, including negotiation with the university authorities (from 1967) and with the college authorities during Dindee's period as a constituent of the University of St Andrews.

The Union gained its first accommodation by the renting of the Ellenbank building in 1905 with £4,000 raised from the University College Bazaar - a fairly regular event of official speakers, entertainments, live music, comedy and stalls - held in October 1903. The building itself had been constructed as a villa in 1813 and had been acquired by the University College in more recent years.

Ellenbank was initially separated by levels, providing separate rooms for the male and female students - with the ladies entering up a flight of stairs to the rear and the gentlemen having sole use of the "handsome" entrance hall. Despite the segregation, this was probably the first Students' Union in the United Kingdom to admit both men and women to the same association and also to allow them use of the same building. Ellenbank later underwent extensive renovation in the 1920s, and was connected to the neighbouring (and similar) Union Mount building, which housed the college library. By 1969, it was decided that new and larger premises were necessary and a new building was completed in 1974. New Dines was demolished in 1986. The Ellenbank building is now used by the university's School of Accountancy.

== Student Media ==
=== Publications ===
The present publication issued by the Association is known as The Magdalen. From its beginnings in 2006, the magazine has undergone several transformations. Following the impact of the pandemic, The Magdalen increased its online presence and acquired the Fibre digital media outlet. A free publication, the magazine is circulated within the DUSA building and associated buildings on the campus. It is also available online on www.themagdalen.co.uk.

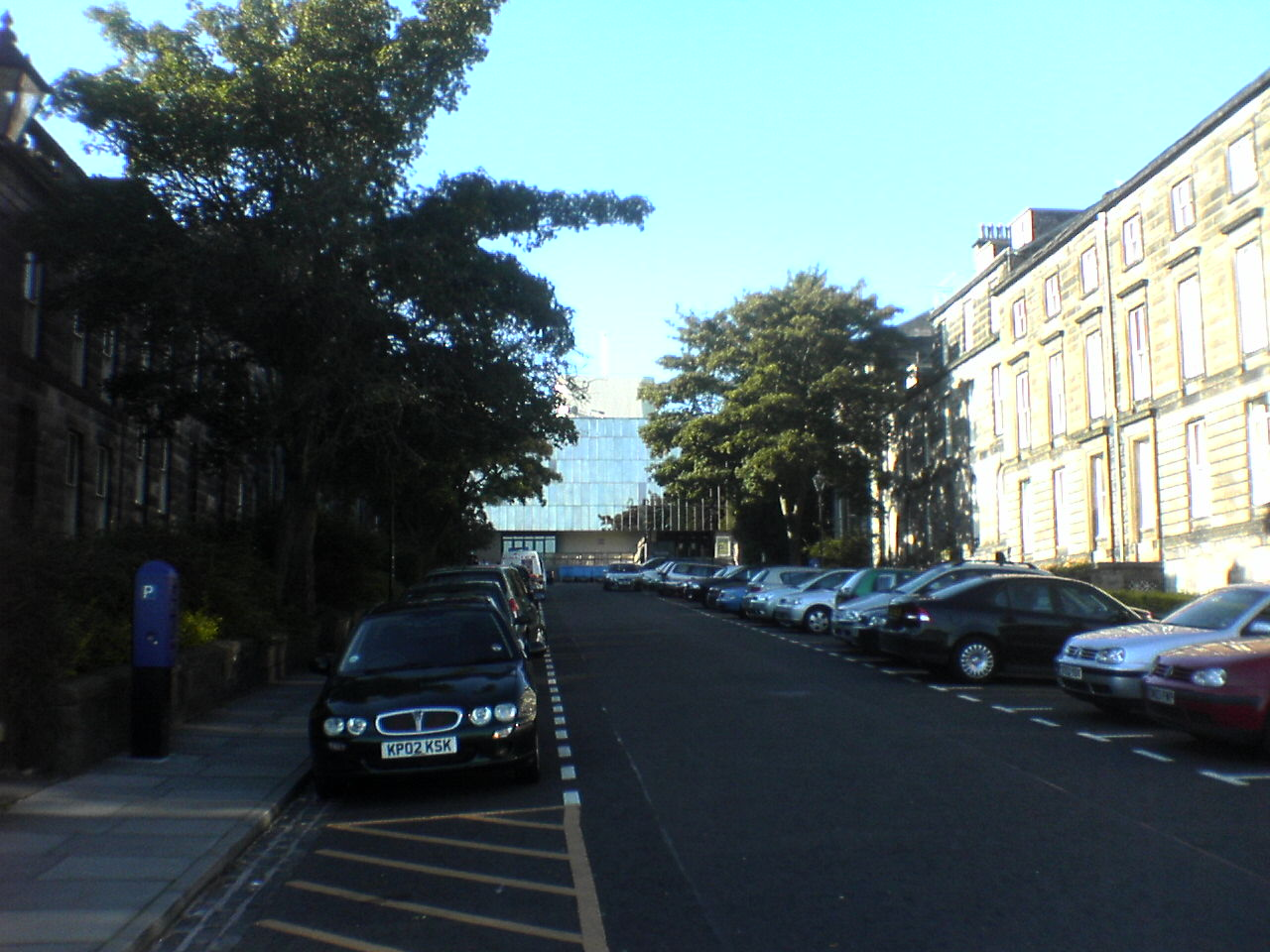
The present Students' Association building (top centre) and the university's Airlie Place

There is a long history of student publications at Dundee - before 2006, The Magdalen was known as The Student Times and criticised for being bland and inoffensive. This bucked the tradition of very political publications such as Annasach (Gaelic: Unusual, Unconventional) which was edited for a time by controversial ex-MI5 agent David Shayler, who was responsible for printing extracts from Peter Wright's Spycatcher - a book banned in the UK at the time.

Lord George Robertson was also a columnist for the newspaper in its early days. Another former Labour MP, Brian Wilson, was also involved as an early Editor of Annasach. It was his experience as Editor that helped him found the West Highland Free Press in 1972.

Annasach survived from the university's independence in 1967 until 1994. Prior to this, College was the publication in general circulation at Queen's College Dundee, which went on to become the university.

In 2006, The Student Times became The Magdalen.

As the 2006/07 term neared an end, a long-term plan was drafted and The Magdalen received the financial backing required to regularly publish 8 issues throughout the student year.

The Magdalen's position is both an entertainment magazine and a tool for on-campus political commentary. A Memorandum of Understanding between DUSA and The Magdalen was established, ensuring the outlet would be supported financially, and that the Editor would be elected by the students, alongside the annual DUSA Executive elections.

=== JAM - DUSA Radio ===
Jam Radio is a student led radio station situated in the city of Dundee. Funded and facilitated by DUSA, it provides entertainment to students and non-students alike. It is run by, and for, the students of Dundee and aims to help students get their first foot on the media industry ladder.

Initially founded as 'Discover Radio' by student Robin Murphy, and launched on the 12th of October 2010 with special guests The View, the radio station has undergone a number of rebrands in the years since - initially to simply 'DUSA Radio' and later to 'The Jam'.

=== Tay Productions ===
Tay Productions (formerly known as 'DUSA TV') was formed in late 2009 and regularly produces content by students, for students, which are then published on DUSA TV's YouTube channel and the DUSA Media website. Content includes a weekly news programme, The Soc Adventures focusing on societies and sports clubs as well as sketches and longer pieces of fiction. In 2015 Tay Productions was named 'Best Broadcaster' at NaSTA. In 2019 they expanded their focus to produce independent shorts as well as online digital content. All of this was achieved, despite DUSA not providing a studio space for the outlet.

=== Fibre - Online ===
In 2012 DUSA appointed its first Online Media Manager, Harrison Kelly, to coincide with the launch of a DUSA Media website. This website hosted articles written for the site, articles from The Magdalen, as well as hosting DUSA TV's videos and a DUSA Radio live feed. In 2022 the Fibre was incorporated into the structures of The Magdalen, following the digitalization of the latter.

== Executive Officers ==
There are four sabbatical officers of the Students' Association, and three non-sabbatical officers who form the Students' Association Executive.

The DUSA Executive along with seven external trustees form DUSA's board of trustees which meets on a 6 weekly basis.

== Affiliations ==
DUSA is affiliated to the Coalition of Higher Education Students in Scotland (CHESS) and the National Postgraduate Committee. Unlike most students unions in the United Kingdom, DUSA is not affiliated to the National Union of Students.

DUSA was part of the Scottish Union of Students which became part of the NUS in 1971. But in 1980 DUSA disaffiliated from the NUS, only to re-affiliate again in the mid-1980s until 1994 when it left once more. This stance was confirmed in a referendum held on 1 and 2 April 2010 in which 1,795 students voted against and 467 voted for NUS affiliation.

The Union has a collective purchasing and co-ordination agreement with a number of other Scottish students bodies through the Northern Services group.

The Sports Union is affiliated to British Universities and Colleges Sport (BUCS). Unlike in many universities, the Sports Union is a separate body from the main Students' Union, instead, it is officially part of the university's structure. DUSA and the Sports Union collaborate on many projects, and the Sports Union Executive officers used to be based in the main DUSA building. They are now based in the university's Institute of Sport and Exercise.
