= Coalition of Higher Education Students in Scotland =

The Coalition of Higher Education Students in Scotland (CHESS) was a body representative of students in Scotland, founded in 2001 by the Students' Associations of Aberdeen, Dundee, Edinburgh and St Andrews Universities, and Glasgow University's students' representative council.

CHESS is inactive and has not published minutes since April 2009.

CHESS was founded in 1999 out of the previous Scottish Ancients Group when the Students' Association at Strathclyde demonstrated an interest in membership. Membership of CHESS was compatible with membership of the National Union of Students Scotland, though at the time the organisation went dormant no members except Aberdeen University Students' Association were affiliates of National Union of Students Scotland.

The goal of CHESS was to provide a national forum for dialogue and policy enhancement on issues affecting students. The body provided a channel for representing the views of students in Scotland to national and governmental bodies.

The CHESS Executive Committee was made up of two representatives from each member institution, usually the president and one other. There were two office bearers in CHESS; the convener, who chaired meetings and represented CHESS externally, and the secretary, who dealt with all administrative matters.

== Members ==
- Aberdeen University Students' Association
- Dundee University Students' Association
- Glasgow University Students' Representative Council
- University of St Andrews Students' Association
- Open University Students Association in Scotland
- Glasgow School of Art Students' Association
- National Postgraduate Committee (dormant since 2007)

== Former members ==
- Edinburgh University Students' Association (joined in 2002 as a founding member; disaffiliated on 10 January 2006)
- University of Strathclyde Students' Association (disaffiliated in March 2010)
