= Birkbeck Students' Union =

Students' union in England

- Institution: Birkbeck, University of London
- Location: London, England, United Kingdom
- Established: 1904; 122 years ago
- Sabbatical officers: Naomi Smith (Leader); Pedro Malheiro (Leader)
- Members: c. 12,000 total
- Website: www.birkbeckunion.org

Birkbeck Students' Union (also Birkbeck Union or Birkbeck SU) is the representative body for students at Birkbeck, University of London, a public research university located in Bloomsbury, London, England.

As Birkbeck primarily offers part-time courses, often in the evenings, student life is less centralised than in other universities. Birkbeck Students' Union offers a number of societies for students, as well as a various sports clubs that compete in the University of London league. It also provides student representation and support, a student magazine, a student shop and a bar. Birkbeck students also have access to the societies and clubs of the Student Central, whose building adjoins Birkbeck's Bloomsbury site.

== History ==
Birkbeck Students' Union was founded in 1904, making it one of the oldest Students' Unions in the world. In 1922, it was one of the founding members of the National Union of Students.

Since its foundation, the Students' Union has been rather atypical of other students' unions in the UK, with a reduced focus on commercial activities, and greater focus on political lobbying on behalf of its members.

In 1956, the Students' Union housed 50 Hungarian refugees, fleeing the conflict of the Hungarian Revolution of 1956.

== Organisation ==
Initially governed by a Council, elected from and responsible to the students, today it is governed jointly by a Student Council, Executive Committee, Board of Trustees and Clubs & Societies Committee. Under the Royal Charter granted to the College in 1926, the Students' Union appoints two Governors to the Governing Body of the university each year, from among its sabbatical officers. Students initially paid an annual membership fee to join, but students are now automatically registered as members when they enrol onto a course at the university. The Students' Union is led by six sabbatical officers: two Students' Union Leaders, a Women's Officer, a Disabled Students' Officer, a Black Students' Officer, an LGBTQ+ Students' Officer.

In 2020, the Students' Union expanded this to include a seventh sabbatical officer, its Trans Students' Officer.

== Lamp and Owl Magazine ==
The college arms include a lamp and an owl, symbolising the college's motto In nocte consilium ("study by night"). Because of this, the student magazine is called Lamp and Owl. Its name was changed in 2010 to Lampanelle, and after an 18-month hiatus returned in February 2012 with the name having reverted to The Lamp And Owl.

The original name of the institution was the London Mechanics' Institute. For this reason, the annual literary magazine published by the Birkbeck MA Creative Writing programme is called Mechanics' Institute Review.

== University Challenge ==
The college has entered teams in University Challenge over the years, with varied results. In 1997, a team scored just 40 points – at that stage the lowest score since the series had been revived, though this has since been broken by New Hall, Cambridge, the University of Bradford and the University Challenge: The Professionals team of Members of Parliament. 1998 saw a reversal of fortunes when Birkbeck reached the final, losing to Magdalen College, Oxford. In 2003, Birkbeck again reached the final, facing another team of mature students from Cranfield University. On this occasion, Birkbeck won University Challenge. Participant colleges for the series are not picked on the basis of their scores alone.

In the past two decades, Birkbeck has consistently done well in University Challenge, ranked among the best since the TV series was revived with Jeremy Paxman.

== Mooting ==
Birkbeck's School of Law actively competes in national and international mooting competitions of simulated court proceedings. At the 2012 Inner Temple Inter-Varsity Moot Birkbeck went through to the quarter-finals, being selected as one of the final eight teams of the 32 UK Universities (64 teams) which competed for the prestigious Inner Temple award. In 2012 Birkbeck was entered in the prized University of Oxford-based Price Moot Competition and finished within the top 15 Law Schools in the competition. The competition draws Law Schools from universities all around the world and focuses on international law.
