= Student unionism in the United Kingdom =

University student unions

In universities in the United Kingdom, students' unions are constituted under Section 2 of the Education Act 1994. The ultimate purpose of students' unions is to democratically represent the interests of their members. Students who resign their membership may still use union social facilities provided (often the main or only such facilities available) since they are for the benefit of the students of the institution, not just union members. The vast majority of UK students' unions are affiliated with the National Union of Students (NUS).

== History ==
The first students' union in the UK was the Student Representative Council formed at the University of Edinburgh in 1884. The Universities (Scotland) Act 1889 secured the existence of students' representative councils (SRCs) at the four Scottish universities then in existence and their right to make representations to the university courts.

In England, primarily social "union societies" came into existence earlier, such as the Cambridge Union (1815) and the Oxford Union (1823), but these were not representative bodies. The first students' union to develop in England was the Liverpool Guild of Students in 1892, although the UCL Student Union was the first to receive official recognition, in 1893. In some cases, the union society transformed into the students' union, e.g. at King's College London where the Union Society of King's College London (established in 1873) became the King's College London Students' Union in 1908, while in others an entirely new body was established alongside the existing society, e.g. at Durham University where the Durham Colleges Students' Representative Council was established in 1899 separately from the Durham Union Society.

In 1918, the Presidents of University Unions conference in Manchester expressed the need to have an association to promote sport at universities across the country. The Inter-varsity Athletics Board (IVAB) of England and Wales was established in 1919 and organised the first inter-varsity track and field meeting that year at Manchester University; the women's IVAB was founded in 1923. The IVAB evolved into today's British Universities and Colleges Sport.

The National Union of Students was established in 1922.

Britain's first students' union building was built at the University of Liverpool in 1910–1913. This was again predated by buildings built for union societies, including the Oxford Union in 1857, the Cambridge Union in 1866, and the Edinburgh University Union's Teviot Row House in 1889.

== Terminology ==
Although "students' union" is by far the most common name adopted by these organisations in the UK, seven (including Exeter, Liverpool and Birmingham) are named 'guilds' of students while the term 'students' association' is also used at some institutions, particularly in Scotland, where the ancient universities used to have a pair of segregated student unions for men and women and/or had separate "unions" for social activities and "students' representative councils" for representational matters (an arrangement that still exists at the University of Glasgow). When these were amalgamated the term 'students' association' was introduced.

== Activities ==
In addition to lobbying, campaigning, debating and carrying out other representative activities, most students' unions facilitate 'student activities' (societies, volunteering opportunities, and sport) peer-led support (through advice centres, helplines, job shops and more), and social venues to bring their members together. Most unions receive some funding through an annual allocation, also called the block grant, from their educational institution. Many unions supplement this income from commercial sales from their venues, shops, and marketing revenue.

== Influence ==
Although the Conservative government under John Major attempted to severely reduce the influence of students' unions in Britain, the NUS and individual students' unions managed to successfully lobby against the moves to restrict their political activities. The then Education Secretary, John Patten aimed to end the 'closed shop' and ensure students would have to join their union (opt-in) rather than automatically becoming a member. As many unions receive funding based upon membership levels this threatened their ability to achieve their core business.

In 2004, lobbying by the NUS against a bill to introduce variable student fees in English and Welsh universities contributed towards the Labour government's majority being slashed to just five in the Commons vote on the bill. However, this bill passed as the Higher Education Act 2004.

== Law relating to students' unions ==
The role of students' unions is enshrined in the Education Act 1994, which requires educational institutions to have a code of practice and publicise the ability to opt-out from membership without forfeiting access to the majority of union services. The Act also requires that unions have a written constitution and that elections to major union offices are held by a secret ballot of the membership. The Act states that if a petition signed by a minimum number of students (the threshold cannot exceed 5 per cent) is lodged then a referendum must be held on whether or not to end one of the union's affiliations. Money donated to a students' union is subject to ultra vires law and can only be spent to further this charitable purpose. A major source of funding for most unions are 'block grant' donations given by their colleges or universities. Historically, the majority of students' unions were exempt charities however a change to the law means that unions became registered charities during 2010. Students' unions are required to act in the interests of their members as students.

In general, a students' union is a separate legal person from the university or college which it is associated with, however in some cases the union is regarded as an integral part of the university.

== Scotland ==
All students are eligible to elect members to the Student Representative Council unless they opt-out under the Education Act 1994, and the president of the SRC is often a member of the university court, the governing body of a Scottish ancient. Where separate students' unions still exist (for example at the University of Glasgow), they operate as private members' clubs. At other universities, the SRC and the former union or unions have been combined into a single students' association.

== Northern Ireland ==
In Northern Ireland, students' unions operate in a similar way to those in Great Britain, except that they cannot exclusively be members of NUS. At the height of the Troubles in 1972, a bilateral agreement between the National Union of Students UK and Aontas na Mac Léinn in Éirinn, decided that all student unions within Northern Ireland would hold membership of both organisations, through a new group called NUS-USI. The move was an attempt to promote student unity despite the sectarian divide and the arrangement is still in place.

== Officers ==
In a British students' union a sabbatical officer is a full-time paid officer elected by students from their membership. The sabbatical officers are generally trustees of the students' union. University of Lancashire Students Union has elected paid part time officers who are current students fulfilling the role that is performed by sabbatical officers at other universities. Many students' unions also have unpaid officers who continue as students during their term of office. Some of these non-sabbatical officers may sit on the Executive Committee of the Union, or on the Union Council.

== See also ==
- List of students' unions in the United Kingdom
- Trade union
