= Education Act 1994 =

Act of the Parliament of the United Kingdom

Education Act 1994 (Note: Section 27(1).)
- Act of Parliament
- Parliament of the United Kingdom
- Long title: An Act to make provision about teacher training and related matters; to make provision with respect to the conduct of students’ unions; and for connected purposes.
- Citation: 1994 c. 30
- Territorial extent: England and Wales; Scotland (part II and schedule 2); Northern Ireland (schedule 2); (Note: Section 25.)

Dates
- Royal assent: 21 July 1994
- Commencement: 21 September 1994 (except ss. 22(4),22(5) and 22(6)); 1 April 1995 (ss. 22(4),22(5) and 22(6)); (Note: Section 26.)
Other legislation
Amends	Further and Higher Education Act 1992
Amended by	Education Act 1996; Nursery Education and Grant-Maintained Schools Act 1996; Audit Commission Act 1998; School Standards and Framework Act 1998; Race Relations (Amendment) Act 2000; Education Act 2005; Education and Inspections Act 2006; Education and Skills Act 2008; Education Act 2011; Post-16 Education (Scotland) Act 2013; Higher Education and Research Act 2017

Status: Partially repealed

Text of statute as originally enacted

Revised text of statute as amended

Text of the Education Act 1994 as in force today (including any amendments) within the United Kingdom, from legislation.gov.uk.

The Education Act 1994 (c. 30) is an act of the Parliament of the United Kingdom under John Major's government in 1994, which primarily established the Teacher Training Agency and allowed students to opt out of students' unions.

== Provisions ==
=== Part I ===
Part I relates to teacher training and includes the establishment of the Teacher Training Agency.

Section (1) of the Act mentioned the main objectives of establishing the agency, all of which were aimed at raising the level of education. The remaining sections of this Part focus on governance and the details of funding.

=== Part II ===
Part II of the act gave effect to students' freedom of association by mandating that students must be permitted to opt out of any students' union without being unfairly disadvantaged; this provision replaced an earlier proposal that would have made membership voluntary (i.e. opt-in), which had been seen to have a significant impact on membership of students' unions in Australia and was expected to have a similar impact in the UK. This Part also places further restrictions on Students' Unions by requiring that affiliation to external organizations must be voted on at referendum if 5% of the membership requests a referendum and restricts the time a sabbatical officer can serve to two years. It also stipulates that a students' union must be governed democratically and must be accountable for its finances.

There are various other clauses about the finances and external affiliations of students' unions.

Section 22 of the acts requires that "the procedure for allocating resources to groups or clubs should be fair and should be set down in writing and freely accessible to all students". This has generated some controversy because of the way it can be interpreted. Some assert that it requires all university societies that draw on students' union funding to be open to membership by all students, whilst others assert that this does not explicitly prevent a society of a students' union from restricting its membership to those who share the aims and purposes of the society.
