= Sabbatical officer =

Elected officer of a students' union

In the United Kingdom, a sabbatical officer is a full-time officer elected by the members of a students' union (or similar body such as students' association, students' representative council or guild of students), commonly at a higher education establishment such as a university. Sabbatical officers are usually trustees of their students' union, in its capacity as a charity, and may also sit on or form the board of directors of the union.

Sabbatical officers (or 'sabbs') are normally elected annually, for a one-year term, i.e. a 'sabbatical year'. Some students' unions allow their sabbatical officers stand for re-election for a second year. Terms of more than two years are not permitted in the UK, under the Education Act 1994. Typically, the primary requirement for candidacy (and election) is that a candidate be a member of the body of the relevant association at the time of their candidacy.

Sabbatical years are either taken in between years of study (for example between year two and three of a typical degree, sitting the third year twelve months later than would have normally been the case) or else immediately after graduation. They are almost always paid positions, with funds coming from the students' union itself, or directly from the educational institution. The officer generally retains student status during their time in office.

A university students' union may have one or more sabbatical officers, with as many as eight being not unheard of. Each generally has a specific job description and title, such as President, Education Officer, Societies Officer, Sports Officer (often both Sports and Societies are overseen by one Students Activities Officer), Services Officer, Welfare Officer or Communications Officer. Together they form all or part of the "executive" or "executive committee" (or equivalent) of their organisation. They are generally supported by unpaid part-time officers who fulfil their roles while continuing their studies. In some cases, sabbaticals may work for separate bodies within a larger students' association at their institution; for example a sabbatical president of an athletics union when there are other officer working for the main students' union.

Some Further Education colleges also have small numbers of sabbatical officers but these are rare, partly due to funding restrictions. Often the executive members of the students' association of these bodies will do the job whilst still studying.

Student organisations outside of individual educational institutions, such as the National Union of Students of the United Kingdom, sometimes have their own sabbatical officers drawn from one of their member institutions.
