= Morpeth =

Morpeth may refer to:

- Morpeth, New South Wales, Australia
  - Electoral district of Morpeth, a former electoral district of the Legislative Assembly in New South Wales
- Morpeth, Ontario, Canada
- Morpeth, Northumberland, England, UK
  - Morpeth (UK Parliament constituency), a former parliamentary constituency
  - Morpeth Grammar School or King Edward VI School, a voluntary controlled academy in Morpeth, England
  - Morpeth railway station, a railway station on the East Coast Main Line
  - Morpeth Town A.F.C., a football club in Morpeth, England
- Morpeth School, a secondary school in the East End of London, England, UK

== People with the surname ==
- Douglas Morpeth (1924–2014), British accountant

== See also ==
- Morpeth Arms, a public house in the Pimlico district of London
- Morpeth Dock, part of Birkenhead docks, Merseyside
- Morpeth Herald, a weekly newspaper published in Morpeth, England
- Morpeth House, a building in Ipswich, Suffolk
- Viscount Morpeth, the title of the heir apparent to the Earl of Carlisle
