= Stephen Bush =

British journalist and political editor

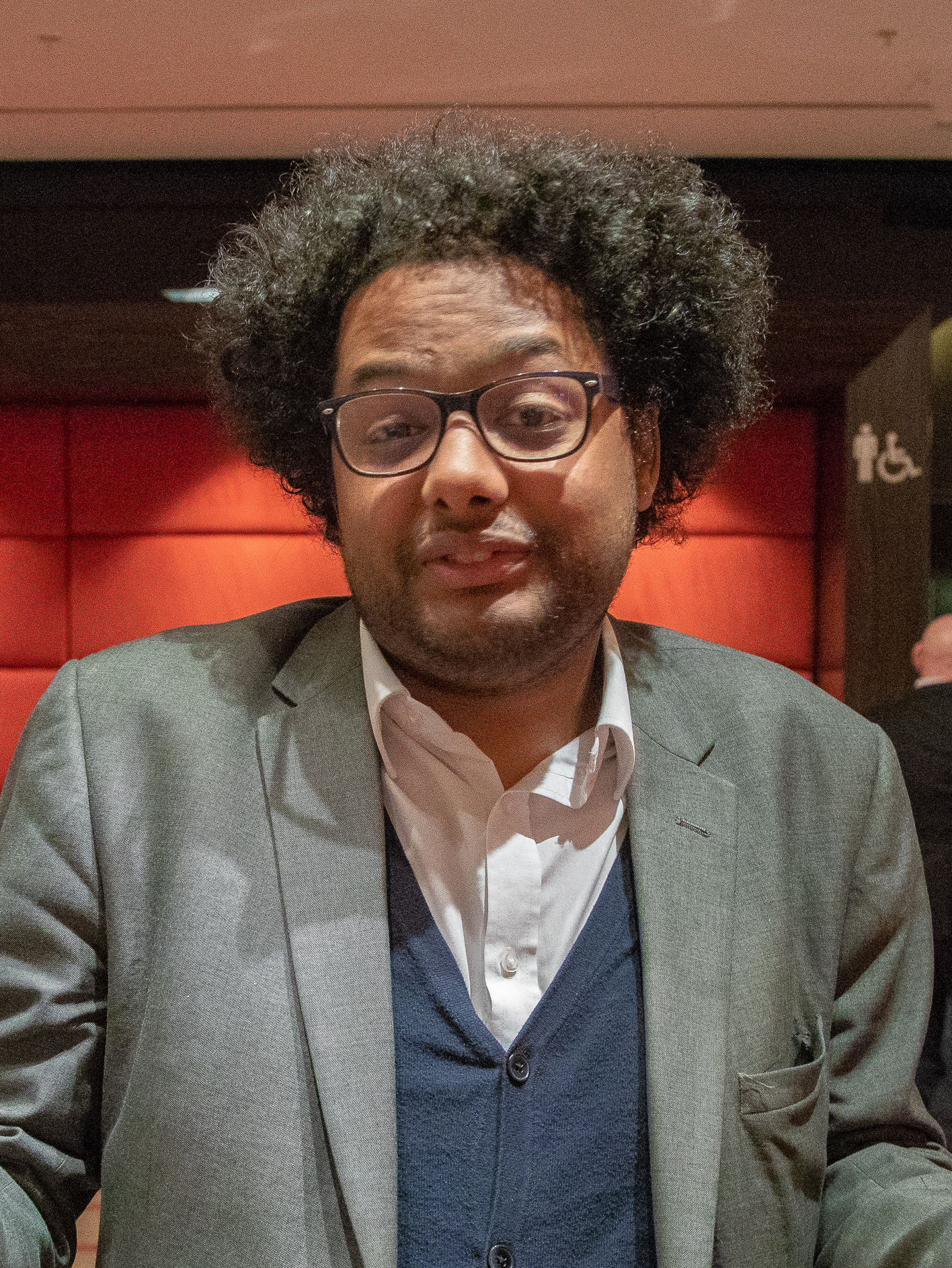
- Bush at the British Kebab Awards 2019
- Born: Stephen Kupakwesu Bush; London, England, UK
- Education: Morpeth School; University of Oxford (BA)
- Occupation: Journalist
- Employers: Financial Times; The Guardian; The Daily Telegraph; The i Paper; New Statesman
- Website: www.ft.com/stephen-bush

Stephen Kupakwesu Bush is a British journalist. As of April 2025 he is a columnist and associate editor at the Financial Times. He has also written for The Guardian, The Daily Telegraph, The Jewish Chronicle, Jewish News, Times of Israel, The i Paper and New Statesman.

== Early life and education ==
Bush's father is British-Zimbabwean. His white South African maternal grandmother left for England due to having a child with a Cape Malay man before meeting Bush's maternal grandfather, whose Jewish ancestors had fled the Russian Empire in the 19th century. Bush attended Morpeth School, a state comprehensive school in Bethnal Green in East End of London. He graduated with a degree in history from Balliol College, Oxford in 2011. During university, Bush was a member of the Oxford University Labour Club, where he served as Co-Chair for one term.

== Career ==
Bush worked for the magazine Progress (linked to the organisation of the same name) before writing for The Daily Telegraph, including working on the Morning Briefing email as editorial assistant to Benedict Brogan. He joined the New Statesman from the Telegraph in February 2015. Later that year, he was the first political commentator to predict Jeremy Corbyn's election as Labour leader after obtaining leaked internal poll data.

From 2016 to 2017, he contributed a weekly column to The Guardian's Lifestyle pages on cooking, called "The Delia Project", where he recounted his efforts to relearn cookery skills using only Delia Smith's Delia's Complete How to Cook.

In December 2018, he was appointed political editor of the New Statesman, while also writing a fortnightly column for the i newspaper. In February 2022, he left to become a columnist and associate editor at the Financial Times, including writing a morning political briefing email.

In 2020, he was appointed to chair the Board of Deputies of British Jews' Commission on Racial Inclusivity in the Jewish Community.

=== Awards ===
In 2015, Bush received a commendation and was runner-up in the Young Journalist of the Year awards category in the Press Awards.

In 2017, he was awarded the Political Studies Association's Journalist of the Year award.

== Personal life ==
Bush is Jewish. He supports Arsenal football club.
