= Andrew Pakes =

British politician (born 1973)

Andrew Pakes MP
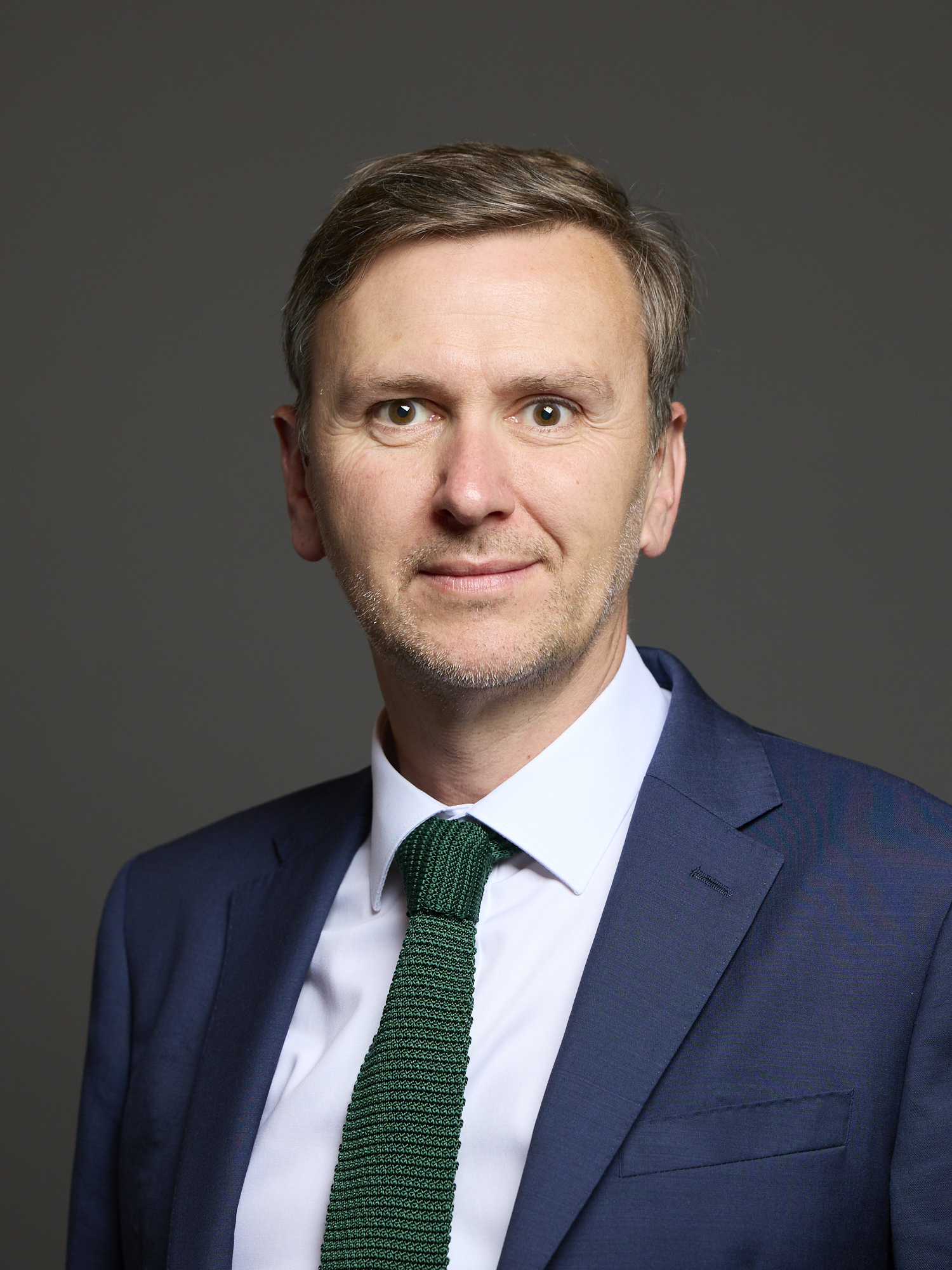
- Official portrait, 2024

Member of Parliament for Peterborough
- Incumbent
- Assumed office 4 July 2024
- Preceded by: Paul Bristow
- Majority: 118 (0.2%)

Southwark Borough Councillor for Livesey Ward
- In office 4 May 2006 – 6 May 2010
- Preceded by: Richard Porter
- Succeeded by: Michael Situ

48th President of the National Union of Students
- In office 1998–2000
- Preceded by: Douglas Trainer
- Succeeded by: Owain James

Personal details
- Born: Andrew Stone; 24 April 1973 (age 53) Newport Pagnell, Buckinghamshire, England
- Party: Labour Co-op
- Education: Ousedale School
- Alma mater: University of Hull (BA, MSc)

Andrew Elliot Pakes (born 24 April 1973 as Andrew Stone) is a British politician who has served as Member of Parliament (MP) for Peterborough since 2024. A member of the Labour and Co-operative Party, he previously served as the 48th President of the National Union of Students (NUS) from 1998 to 2000.

== Early life ==
Pakes was born and grew up in Newport Pagnell, Borough of Milton Keynes, Buckinghamshire. He was educated at Ousedale School, before going on to the University of Hull where he completed a Bachelor's degree in Politics and a Master's degree in Environmental Management.

== Political career ==
An active member of Labour Students, he was on the national executive of the National Union of Students from 1996 to 2000 and was twice elected the national president of NUS, serving in the role from 1998 to 2000. He had previously served as the organisation's National Treasurer from 1997 to 1998. Pakes was the second openly gay individual to be elected NUS president after Stephen Twigg (who was president from 1990 to 1992).

After his term as NUS president, Pakes worked for the Association of University Teachers (AUT, now part of the University and College Union), and for the then-Deputy Mayor of London, Nicky Gavron. He later worked as a consultant on environmental and transport policy, and served as Chair of the Socialist Environment and Resources Association (SERA, a Labour-linked environmental campaign) and as a member of the Labour Party's National Policy Forum, representing the affiliated socialist societies. He was a Councillor in the London Borough of Southwark from 2006 to 2010, standing down in that year to contest the Milton Keynes North parliamentary seat.

He was a special adviser to Mary Creagh, working with the shadow DEFRA team. He was the initial head of PR for the British Kebab Awards.

He previously worked as Head of Communications, Organising and External Affairs at the science and engineering trade union, Prospect. He was formerly in public affairs at Tetra Strategy, and earlier worked for Connect Public Affairs. Among his voluntary positions, he served as a Trustee of the National Energy Foundation, a Milton Keynes-based charity, from June 2017 to April 2018.

From 2019 to 2022 Pakes was a trustee of Stonewall, a lesbian, gay, bisexual and transgender (LGBT) rights charity. He was also a Board Member at CDS Co-Operatives, providing social housing and co-op housing services in London and the South East of England.

=== Parliamentary candidate ===
==== Milton Keynes ====
Pakes stood as the Labour and Co-operative Party parliamentary candidate in the constituency of Milton Keynes North at the 2010 general election, where he was defeated by the Conservative Party candidate Mark Lancaster on a swing of 9.2%. This was one of the largest swings from Labour to the Conservatives recorded in the United Kingdom during the 2010 general election.

Pakes was selected as Labour Co-op's Prospective Parliamentary Candidate for Milton Keynes South in the 2015 general election. Pakes went on to lose this election to Iain Stewart of the Conservative Party, with Stewart increasing his majority by almost 3,500 votes.

==== Peterborough ====
In July 2022, Pakes was selected as the Labour Co-op candidate for the marginal Conservative seat of Peterborough, in preparation for the next general election.

In April 2025, he spoke with FE News about the need for a robust apprenticeship system in the United Kingdom that aligns with the industrial strategy, addressing the skills gap in the workforce. In May 2025, Pakes spoke during a House of Commons debate, and urged the Home Secretary, Yvette Cooper, to end the use of one of Peterborough's hotels to house 146 people seeking asylum. Later that month, he urged Peterborough City Council to build an Olympic-sized swimming pool in the city. He said, "I believe we can get an indoor swimming pool built in Peterborough within five years. It should be built on the site of the now closed Peterborough Regional Pool as the council already owns the land. We need to be ambitious." In September 2025, he wrote to the Energy Minister, Michael Shanks, requesting a meeting together with a group of Prospect energy reps to discuss urgent issues of resiliency in the UK's electricity network.

=== Elections contested ===
UK Parliament elections

Date of election	Constituency	Party	Votes	%	Result
2010	Milton Keynes North	Labour Co-op	14,458	26.8	Not elected (2nd)
2015	Milton Keynes South	Labour Co-op	18,929	32.1	Not elected (2nd)
2024	Peterborough	Labour Co-op	13,418	32.0	Elected

Southwark Borough Council elections

Date of election	Ward	Party	Votes	%	Result
2006	Livesey	Labour Party	1,698	45.9	Elected

Political offices
Preceded by Douglas Trainer	President of the National Union of Students; 1998–2000	Succeeded by Owain James
