= Noreldin Waisy =

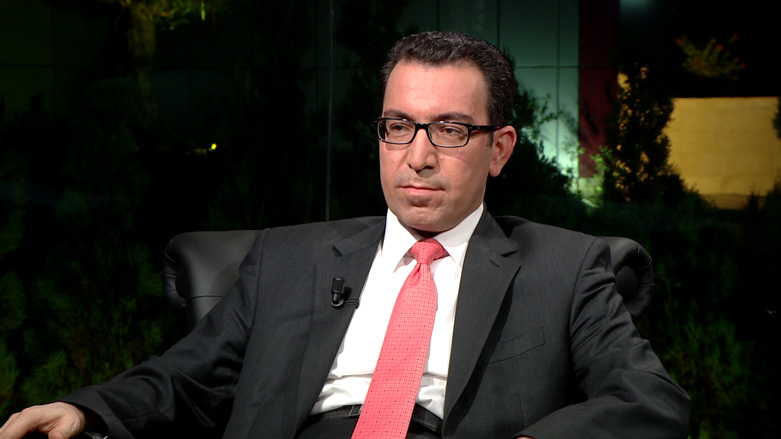
- Born: Girtik, Choman district, Kurdistan
- Education: Master’s in Media communications
- Alma mater: Hertfordshire University
- Occupations: Press Secretary to KRG Prime Minister Masrour Barzani, political analyst, journalist
- Years active: 1992-present
- Website: kurdistan24.net

Noreldin Waisy, (born 5 April 1974), is a Kurdish political analyst and journalist. He helped found the Kurdish media broadcasting outlets Rudaw and Kurdistan 24. He served as the general manager of Kurdistan 24, based in the Kurdistan's capital Erbil, from 2015 to 2019. Waisy currently serves as the press secretary to Kurdistan Regional Government (KRG) Prime Minister Masrour Barzani.

== Early life ==
Waisy was born in the small village of Girtik in Kurdistan's Choman district near the border with Iran. Waisy and his family fled their hometown after the 1975 Kurdish revolution was crushed by Iraqi forces. They (along with thousands of other Kurds from Iraqi Kurdistan) stayed in Iran for several months as refugees before returning to the Kurdistan region.

The village of Girtik was one of many that was destroyed by the Iraqi dictator Saddam Hussein. It was burned to the ground, the result of a scorched earth practice that was implemented in parallel with the Arabization policy of the Ba’athist regime. Waisy and his family were forcibly displaced to the southern provinces of Iraq, where he lived in Al-Diwaniyah and Baqubah for five years.

In the 1980s, he graduated high school in Soran before earning a degree in Administration and Economy at the University of Salahuddin in Erbil.

== Time as a refugee ==
In 2002, Waisy fled to Syria before the fall of Saddam's regime in Iraq. The Kurdish status in Iraqi Kurdistan was vulnerable to military incursions, notably from Turkey,) which was combating the Kurdistan Workers’ Party (PKK), an insurgent group based in the mountains between the Kurdistan region's border with Turkey and Iran.

In 2004, Waisy emigrated to Canada as a refugee after the fall of Saddam and during the start of the Iraq War – Operation Iraqi Freedom. In Canada, he settled in Toronto with many other Kurdish refugees and helped found the Greater Toronto Area Kurdish House. He eventually received Canadian citizenship.

In 2008, Waisy returned to Kurdistan where he helped establish Rudaw Media, which was at first limited to a newspaper and a website. Eventually, the outlet launched its own television channel.

In 2012, Waisy was a recipient of the British Chevening Scholarship for International Students. He completed a Master of Arts in Journalism and Media Communications at the University of Hertfordshire in London. Prior to the emergence of the Islamic State in Iraq, Waisy returned to Erbil in 2013 to work on a new media project. In 2015, at the height of the Islamic State's control of territories in northern and central Iraq, just outside Erbil's borders, Waisy launched a major news network, Kurdistan 24, as founder and general manager.

== Professional life ==
Waisy is a published author in Arabic, Kurdish, and English. He has contributed to multiple international and Middle Eastern news outlets, including The Washington Times, The Jerusalem Post, the Telegraph, and others in Kurdistan. Waisy has appeared as a political analyst on Al-Jazeera Arabic and English, France 24, Fox News, BBC Arabic, and other local broadcasting channels. He continues to appear frequently on major television networks and in the press where he discusses Kurdistan issues.

As Kurdistan 24 general manager, Waisy was also the organizer of a major symposium held in the United States' Congress in 2017 ahead of Kurdistan's referendum on independence. The Capitol Hill symposium from July 28, 2017, sponsored jointly by Kurdistan 24 and The Washington Times, was entitled "The Kurdistan Region: A Strategic US Ally in a Tough Neighborhood". Waisy coordinated with The Washington Times to run a special edition dedicated to the referendum.

He organized a similar event in London with the Centre for Kurdish Progress and concurrently ran a special edition with British news outlet, The Telegraph.
