= 2026 Erbil floods =

Natural disaster in Iraq

- Date: 7 November 2026
- Location: Erbil governorate, Kurdistan Region, Iraq
- Cause: Heavy rainfall
- Deaths: 2
- Injuries: 300
- Missing: 5
- Property damage: US$8 million (preliminary assessment)
- 6,276 people, 466 shops and 190 vehicles affected

On 7 November 2026, heavy rainfall across Erbil Governorate caused an estimated accumulation of 80 mm of rain across the governorate and 120 mm on its outskirts, leading to devastating flooding in most districts and areas of Erbil Governorate. Torrential flash floods rushed towards the centre of Erbil Governorate within a short period of time causing extensive damage. Two people were confirmed dead while five were missing and 300 were injured. A total of 6,276 people, 466 shops and 190 vehicles were affected by the flood. Inaccurate weather forecasts and the lack of proper infrastructure contributed to the failure to adequately prepare for and avoid the large extent of damage and loss of life suffered by the governorate.

The Kurdistan Regional Government urged the Iraqi central government to provide emergency relief in the form of monetary compensation.

== Background ==
Heavy thunderstorms hit the region in November 2026, including in neighbouring Iran. On the early morning of 7 November 2026, heavy rainfall fell on northern Iraq, with Erbil Governorate bearing most of the damage. Kurdish meteorological forecasts proved vastly inaccurate as they had initially estimated an accumulation of 30mm of rain, while in reality the actual accumulation was more than double and in some areas quadruple that amount.

== Impact ==
According to Kurdistan 24, heavy rainfall "caused water to accumulate rapidly in streets and residential areas across Erbil," after which first responders were mobilized to rescue people trapped by subsequent floods. Not long after, there were reports of the death of a 25-year-old volunteer who was swept away by a powerful current. Likewise, a five-year-old boy travelling with his father was swept away by currents and also drowned while his father escaped. The floods caused extensive damage on homes, roads and businesses. Government buildings and public facilities were also damaged. Survivers recalled having to jump out of their cars and swim to safety. Overall, more than 6,000 people were affected by the floods. As of 14 November, thorough assessment of the damage was still ongoing.
