= Ousedale School =

Academy in Newport Pagnell and Olney, England

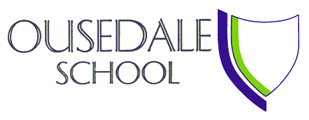

Location
- The Grove; Newport Pagnell, Buckinghamshire, MK16 0BJ; England; 52°04′48″N 0°44′07″W

Information
- Type: Academy
- Motto: Be Kind, Work Hard, Succeed Together
- Established: 1963
- Local authority: City of Milton Keynes
- Specialist: Technology College
- Department for Education URN: 137052 Tables
- Ofsted: Reports
- Headteacher: Paul McFadden
- Staff: 200+
- Gender: Coeducational
- Age: 11 to 19
- Enrolment: 2000+
- Campuses: Newport Pagnell, Olney
- Colours: Green and Blue
- Publication: Ousenews
- Website: ousedale.org.uk

E-ACT Ousedale School, most commonly referred to as Ousedale School, is an academy based in Newport Pagnell and Olney, in the City of Milton Keynes, Buckinghamshire, England. The first campus opened in 1963 originally for Newport Pagnell and its surrounding villages. A second campus in Olney opened in 2007 for students from the north of the (then) Borough of Milton Keynes district.

== E-ACT Merger ==
In September 2024, Ousedale School officially became E-ACT Ousedale School. Then-headteacher Andy Burton justified the school joining E-ACT – a multi-academy trust – by stating that it is "an exciting opportunity for increased professional development". However, shortly after this was announced, Andy Burton resigned and became education director at the E-ACT multi-academy trust. The current headteacher, Paul McFadden took over the role.

Students and staff alike have since expressed criticism of the trust. For example, in March 2026, a petition that attracted greater than two thousand signatures was created on Change.org by an anonymous member of staff. The petition urges people to sign, to "protect our school and its incredible staff from the ramifications of this financial oversight", referring to the £1.4 million deficit of Ousedale School that occurred after joining the E-ACT trust.

== Olney campus ==
A second Ousedale School campus opened in the easter of 2007. Built by Jackson Construction, it cost a total of £7 million.

== Academic performance ==
These are the Department for Education (DfE) figures published in April 2026 for the 2025 cohort:

Metric	Ousedale	Milton Keynes	England Avg.
Attainment 8 Score	48.4	44.2	46.1
Grade 5+ English & Maths GCSE	51.0%	43.2%	45.4%
Post-16 Education/Employment	96.0%	—	92.0%
English Baccalaureate Average Point Score	4.30	—	4.14

- English Baccalaureate Entry Rate: 34.2% (below the national average).

== Awards and recognition ==
At the 2025 Milton Keynes Education Awards, the school was named "Overall School of the Year". It was also awarded "Best Creative School/Company" at the 2025 MK Inspiration Awards.

== Former teachers ==
- Sir Bruce Liddington, Deputy Head 1981–6, Schools Commissioner DCSF 2006–2009

== Former pupils ==
- Letitia Dean (Actress)
- David Oldfield (Footballer)
- Leah Williamson (Footballer)
- Niko B (Music Artist)
- Chris Curtis (Member of Parliament for Milton Keynes North)
- Andrew Pakes (Member of Parliament for Peterborough)
