= John Woodcock, Baron Walney =

British politician (born 1978)

The Right Honourable The Lord Walney
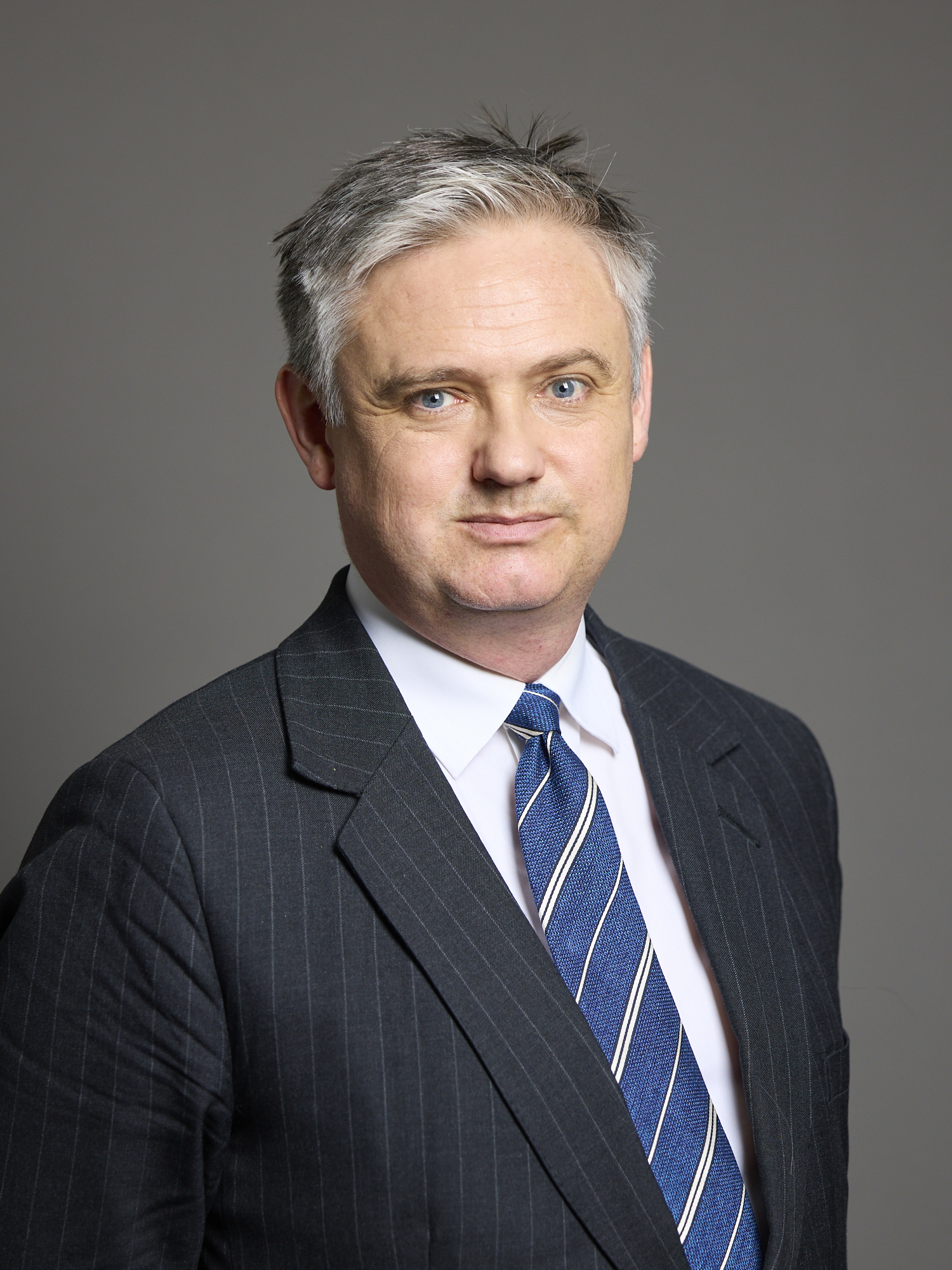
- Official portrait, 2025

Shadow Minister for Young People
- In office 8 May 2015 – 18 September 2015
- Leader: Harriet Harman (acting)
- Preceded by: Yvonne Fovargue
- Succeeded by: Gordon Marsden

Shadow Minister for Transport
- In office 8 October 2010 – 11 January 2013
- Leader: Ed Miliband
- Preceded by: Willie Bain
- Succeeded by: Daniel Zeichner

Member of the House of Lords
- Lord Temporal
- Life peerage 4 September 2020

Member of Parliament for Barrow and Furness
- In office 6 May 2010 – 6 November 2019
- Preceded by: John Hutton
- Succeeded by: Simon Fell

Personal details
- Born: John Zak Woodcock; 14 October 1978 (age 48) Sheffield, South Yorkshire, England
- Party: Independent (2018–present); Labour Co-op (until 2018)
- Other political affiliations: Crossbench (2021–present); Non-affiliated (2020–2021); The Independents (2019)
- Spouse(s): Mandy Telford (m. 2004; div. 2015) Isabel Hardman (m. 2021; sep. 2026)
- Children: 3
- Education: University of Edinburgh
- Website: lordwalney.uk

John Zak Woodcock, Baron Walney (born 14 October 1978) is a British politician and life peer. He acted as the British government's independent adviser on political violence and disruption from 2020 until being removed from the position in February 2025. He served as a Labour Co-op and then independent Member of Parliament (MP) for Barrow and Furness from 2010 to 2019. He was made a life peer in 2020 by Boris Johnson's Conservative government.

Prior to his election to Parliament, Woodcock was a political adviser who worked as an aide to Prime Minister Gordon Brown and cabinet minister John Hutton. He served as a Shadow Transport Minister from 2010 to 2013 under opposition leader Ed Miliband, and briefly as a Shadow Education Minister in 2015 under Harriet Harman. Woodcock was appointed an independent Adviser on Political Violence and Disruption to the UK Government in November 2020. Prime Minister Boris Johnson appointed him as UK Trade Envoy to Tanzania in 2021.

== Early life and career ==
Woodcock was born in Sheffield. His father was a PE teacher and youth worker, and a Labour councillor, and his mother taught at Rotherham College of Arts and Technology. He was educated at Tapton School and the University of Edinburgh. While studying for his degree, he took time out to work as a journalist on The Scotsman, before returning to the university to complete his English and history degree.

Woodcock was elected to run the London branch of Labour Students, and then worked for the Labour Party on the 2005 general election campaign. He later worked as an aide to John Hutton from 2005 to 2008 and later as Special Adviser to Prime Minister Gordon Brown.

== Parliamentary career ==
=== House of Commons ===
Woodcock was elected to the House of Commons as Member of Parliament for Barrow and Furness in the 2010 general election with a majority of 5,208. He succeeded John Hutton, the constituency's Labour MP since 1992.

On 10 October 2010, only five months after being elected to Parliament, he was named a Shadow Minister for Transport. He stepped down from this post for health reasons following an accident in January 2013. In May 2015, Woodcock was appointed Shadow Minister for Young People, but resigned in September 2015, following the election of Jeremy Corbyn as party leader.

From July 2011 to January 2013, Woodcock was Chair of Labour Friends of Israel. Until 2015, Woodcock was the chair of Progress, a ginger group within the Labour Party, promoting Blairite policies within the party.

Woodcock was a vocal critic of Jeremy Corbyn's leadership. In 2016 he wrote an article for the Daily Mirror in which he called on MP's to remove Corbyn as leader. A spokesperson for Corbyn said Woodcock should "accept the democratic decision" of party members in electing him leader in 2015. Shortly after the announcement of the 2017 general election, Woodcock said he "will not countenance" voting to place Corbyn into Downing Street because of the Labour leader's opposition to the Trident renewal programme.

In 2016, Woodcock abstained in the vote on the Labour Party motion to withdraw UK support for the Saudi Arabian-led intervention in Yemen. He met the king of Saudi Arabia, King Salman, in the Saudi capital of Riyadh, in his role as chair of Labour's backbench foreign affairs committee in 2018.

On 16 January 2019, Woodcock abstained in the vote of confidence in Theresa May's Conservative government, saying Corbyn was "unfit to lead the country". On 4 November, he announced he would not be re-standing as an MP in the 2019 general election, due to his partner Isabel Hardman's pregnancy. On 5 November, the government announced it would be appointing him special government envoy to tackle violent extremism with a "particular focus on tackling far-right violent extremism". He stated he would be supporting the Conservative Party in the forthcoming election, and urged voters to vote Conservative.

==== Sexual harassment allegation ====
In November 2017, a former staff member of Woodcock's complained to the Labour Party that he had sent her inappropriate text messages between 2014 and 2016. She reportedly asked for the case to be kept private, but the following year, details were leaked to two newspapers and on 30 April 2018 Woodcock was suspended from membership of the Labour Party and had the party whip withdrawn. Woodcock said "I do not accept that charge but know the complaint must be thoroughly and fairly investigated".

On 24 June 2018, Woodcock said he would no longer cooperate with the Labour Party investigation, as he believed it to be politically motivated. Woodcock stated that he would take the General Secretary of the Labour Party to court to force an independent inquiry to take place. A subject access request by Woodcock to the party found an email in which officials discussed the need to 'deal with Woodcock' in the run-up to the 2017 election, citing another case where an MP had been accused of sexual impropriety as an example of how the party could refuse to endorse a candidate. A senior party figure told The Guardian newspaper that: "There was always a group of people in the leader's office who wanted to hang a couple of our MPs on the right wing of the party out to dry, but wiser heads always prevailed." They added: "They were really, really going for him". According to Heather Stewart of The Guardian, the senior figure "did not dispute the sincerity of the allegations against Woodcock" and there was "no suggestion the staff member’s complaint was motivated by the NEC email." Jeremy Corbyn's spokesman described the email as "a red herring and a smokescreen in regard to a serious case that should have been fully investigated."

==== Labour Party resignation ====
On 18 July 2018, Woodcock resigned from the Labour Party, choosing to sit as an independent MP for the remainder of the term. He said that he believed that the party was "no longer the broad church it has always been", but had instead been "taken over by the hard left" under Corbyn's leadership. Woodcock further called Corbyn "a clear risk to UK national security", and criticised what he saw as the party's tacit endorsement of antisemitism and its failure to provide an independent investigator to rule on his disciplinary case, which he claimed was being "manipulated for factional purposes" within the party. Labour rejected all accusations of bias against Woodcock, arguing that the process is the same for all similar cases. He has since claimed that he pressed Parliament's independent grievance system to accept non-recent complaints so that his case could be heard.

Woodcock sat as an independent MP, before joining a loose grouping of pro-European MPs known as The Independents in July 2019.

=== House of Lords ===
Woodcock was nominated for a life peerage in the 2019 Dissolution Honours, and created Baron Walney, of the Isle of Walney in the County of Cumbria in September 2020. Prime Minister Boris Johnson appointed Woodcock as the UK's Trade Envoy to Tanzania in August 2021.

=== Adviser on Political Violence and Disruption ===
Woodcock was appointed by the UK Government as an independent Adviser on Political Violence and Disruption in November 2020. In the unpaid role, he was commissioned to conduct a review on the subject matter and present it to the Prime Minister and Home Secretary prior to publication.

In November 2023, Woodcock advocated giving police the power to ban pro-Palestinian protests on the streets of Britain if they were deemed to contribute to an atmosphere of intimidation against Jews. He said he would be updating his review to include "looking at the threshold for the police to ban a march".

In May 2024, it was revealed that Woodcock would recommend banning groups like Palestine Action and Just Stop Oil in a forthcoming report. This could involve restricting their right to assembly and ability to fundraise. The report itself was made public by the UK House of Commons on 21 May 2024. The measures contained have been described as the criminalisation of peaceful protest. Woodcock was also criticised by civil liberties campaigners and climate groups because of his positions as a lobbyist for arms and fossil fuel industry groups. Political organisation Momentum called Woodcock's report "a manifesto for a police state". Woodcock was removed from his role in February 2025 when the Labour Party government abolished the position of adviser on political violence to combine it with the Commission for Countering Extremism.

== Other work ==
=== Jewish Chronicle ===
In April 2020, Woodcock was named as part of a consortium, led by Robbie Gibb and including William Shawcross and John Ware, that put in a bid to purchase the assets of The Jewish Chronicle. The Jewish Chronicle chairman Alan Jacobs criticised the offer's anonymity, saying "A bid for the Jewish Chronicle using money from an unidentified source and fronted by a group of individuals who refuse to tell the world anything of their plans looks like a shameful attempt to hijack the world's oldest Jewish newspaper." The bid was successful. Woodcock later confirmed to The Times that he had no involvement in "any formal structure" of the company after helping to save it from liquidation: "The priority at the time was to ensure that the JC could move into a more financially stable position [and] I was pleased to support them in that."

=== Lobbying ===
He holds a number of paid positions as an adviser for lobbying and consultancy companies. He is paid chair of the Purpose Defence Coalition, members of which include arms manufacturer Leonardo, which has "extensive links" to Israel’s military. He is paid chair of the Purpose Business Coalition, members of which include Leonardo and oil company BP. He is a paid senior adviser to Rud Pedersen, a lobbying company with expertise in security and defence, which has oil and gas companies Glencore and Enwell Energy as clients. The groups Good Law Project and Compassion in Politics made an official complaint to the House of Lords Commissioner for Standards, stating that Woodcock "has a commercial interest in organisations whose clients have been targeted by the very protesters whose activities he seeks to ban". Plan B and Palestine Action also questioned Woodcock's independence. Walney announced the complaint had been dismissed

He lobbies for the Duolingo English Test and is a paid member of its advisory board. Register of Interests for Lord Walney

== Personal life ==
Woodcock was married to Mandy Telford, former President of the National Union of Students. They have two daughters. The couple separated in late 2014.

Woodcock began a relationship with the journalist and assistant editor of The Spectator, Isabel Hardman in summer 2016. In November 2019, Woodcock announced Hardman was pregnant; she gave birth to their son on 12 May 2020. The couple married on 30 July 2021 in a small ceremony at Barrow-in-Furness's registry office. In October 2026, Woodcock announced that the pair had separated earlier that year.

Parliament of the United Kingdom
Preceded by John Hutton	Member of Parliament for Barrow and Furness; 2010–2019	Succeeded by Simon Fell
Political offices
Preceded by Willie Bain	Shadow Minister for Transport; 2010–2013	Succeeded by Daniel Zeichner
Orders of precedence in the United Kingdom
Preceded by The Lord Austin of Dudley	Gentlemen; Baron Walney	Followed by The Lord Clarke of Nottingham
