= Who's That What's That =

2020 single by Niko B

"Who's That What's That?"

Single by Niko B
- Released: 21 May 2020
- Genre: Hip hop; comedy rap
- Length: 4:07
- Label: Grind Time
- Songwriter: Tom Austin
- Producer: november.137

Niko B singles chronology
"Mary Berry" (2019)	"Who's That What's That?" (2020)	"Quick Drive" (2020)

Music video
- "Who's That What's That" on YouTube

"Who's That What's That" is a song by English YouTuber and rapper Niko B. It was released on 21 May 2020.

== Composition ==
The lyrics features Bellic rapping about various references about every day teenage life in Britain. These include texting a girl on WhatsApp, buying a Big Mac and taking the gherkin out of the inside, buying vodka and going to a house party, losing his wallet, making profit on Bitcoin, a mad girl trying to fight his family and being late to school. She then burns down his house and once she has come to her house, he then leaves cocaine and alerts the authorities for her to be arrested.

The instrumental part consists of a repeated sequence of lofi rhode chords over a crackly vinyl sound effect, along with a simple drum pattern and a deep bassline. Bellic also provides various ad libs at the end of each line with added reverb, including the refrain ’lechaim’ (referencing Bellic's Jewish background). The song ends with a repetition of 'fuck gherkins'.

== Commercial performance ==
The song went viral on TikTok and as of 8 February 2026 the music video has 6.1 million views on YouTube.

== Music video ==
On 21 May 2020, a music video for the song was released on to Austin's YouTube channel. It was directed by Three Oak Films. The video was filmed in various locations around Austin's hometown of Newport Pagnell and the large town of Milton Keynes in Buckinghamshire, England; these include his house, a kebab shop, a park and a garage.

== Chart performance ==
Chart performance for "Who's That What's That"
Chart (2020)	Peak position
UK Singles (Official Charts)	26
UK Hip Hop/R&B (Official Charts)	16

== Certifications ==
Certifications for "Who's That What's That"
Region	Certification	Certified units/sales
United Kingdom (BPI)	Gold	400,000^{‡}
^{‡} Sales+streaming figures based on certification alone.
