= Niko B =

British rapper (born 2000)

- Born: Tom George Austin; 7 December 2000 (age 25); Buckinghamshire, England
- Origin: Newport Pagnell, Buckinghamshire, England
- Genres: Alternative hip hop; British hip hop; UK underground rap; comedy hip hop

Tom George Austin (born 7 December 2000), better known by his stage name Niko B, is a British rapper and YouTuber from Newport Pagnell, Buckinghamshire. He has been credited as a leading artist within the rise of the UK underground rap scene.

He is best known for his lyrical rap descriptions of "small town Britain" and genre-spanning sound, as well as his singles "Why's This Dealer?" and "Who's That What's That"

== Video games ==
Niko B’s song “Rips in Jeans” was included on the soundtrack of the 2022 video game ‘’FIFA 23’’."Rips In Jeans - Niko B - FIFA 23 Soundtrack". FIFPlay."FIFA 23 soundtrack". The Loadout.

== Career ==
Tom Austin (henceforth referred to by his stage name, Niko B) grew up on the "humdrum" Suburban Poets Estate, in Newport Pagnell, Buckinghamshire. Son of a builder father and special education teacher mother, he attended Ousedale School. He previously worked at a Subway fast food restaurant. Austin's stage name is a reference to Niko Bellic, the protagonist of Grand Theft Auto IV.

He began his music career by releasing single, "Mary Berry", with lyrics focusing around life in small-town Britain. This song's popularity gave him the chance to tour with rappers K.O and V9. In an interview with Clash, Niko B says he vomited before every performance, and technical issues during a show meant he instead sang "Happy Birthday" to a girl in the front row.

His most popular single, "Who's That What's That" was released in May 2020. It became a top 40 hit in the UK, and peaked at No. 26 on the UK Singles Chart. The song's success was boosted by viral marketing on social media platforms Instagram and TikTok.

He runs his own clothing label, CROWD, which is often featured in his music videos.

In 2021 Niko B played The 1Xtra Dance stage at the Reading and Leeds Festivals and released two new singles: "National Baby" and "It's All Gone".

In 2022, he released four new singles, these being "I Had a Fist Fight with an Emo Outside Subway", "Canada Goose", "Love Island Freestyle" and "Rips in Jeans". "Rips in Jeans" went on to feature in the video game FIFA 23.

2024 saw the release of his debut album "dog eat dog food world", under the label Believe UK. It was preceded by the release of singles "tresspass coat", "it's not litter if you bin it", and "boarded the plane". The album incorporates elements of Alt-RnB, Lofi House and Jersey House and features collaborations with artists 'dexter in the newsagent' and 'Kirbs'.

The following year saw Niko B release a significant amount of new music, riding the wave of success bought by 2024 single "Why's this dealer?", which became an Instagram sensation. First was "People", a three song EP coming in at just under nine minutes long. In similar style to "dog eat dog food world", Wordplay magazine described it as "casual, honest, and unbothered by pretension". Then, after the release of singles "Mongoose", "Beginners luck" and "Spawn Trap," he released the mixtape "Cheerleader" on October 3, this time under the label Ditto.

Niko B currently DJs under the alias ‘DJ Antanadecks’.

== Musical style ==
Niko B covers multiple genres, with "nothing off limits in terms of style." For example, in an interview with Vogue, he said wanted to have his own style with his lyrics, for example referencing removing a gherkin from a McDonalds Big Mac burger, written to be relatable to young British people but also unique to him.

Media outlets have consistently praised his lyrical storytelling, often comparing him to Mike Skinner of The Streets. Reviewers have also emphasised his hook writing and individual approach to the vocal style of rap.

== Discography ==
=== Studio albums ===
Title	Details
Dog Eat Dog Food World	Released: 24 May 2024; Label: Believe UK; Formats: LP, CD, cassette, digital download, streaming

=== Mixtapes ===
Title	Details
Cheerleader	Released: 3 October 2025; Label: Ditto; Formats: Digital download, streaming

=== Extended plays ===
Title	Details'
People	Released: 5 June 2025; Label: Believe UK; Formats: Digital download, streaming

=== Singles ===
Title	Year	Peak chart positions			Album
Title	Year	UK	LTU	NZ Hot	Album
"Mary Berry"	2020	—	—	—	Non-album singles
"Who's That What's That"	2020	26	—	—	Non-album singles
"Quick Drive"	2020	—	—	—	Non-album singles
"International Baby"	2021	—	—	—	Non-album singles
"It's All Gone"	2021	—	—	—	Non-album singles
"I Had a Fist Fight with an Emo Outside Subway"	2022	—	—	—	Non-album singles
"Canada Goose"	2022	—	—	—	Non-album singles
"Love Island Freestyle"	2022	—	—	—	Non-album singles
"Rips in Jeans"	2022	—	—	—	Non-album singles
"Trespass Coat"	2024	—	—	—	Dog Eat Dog Food World
"It's Not Litter If You Bin It"	2024	—	—	—	Dog Eat Dog Food World
"Boarded the Plane"	2024	—	—	—	Dog Eat Dog Food World
"Why's This Dealer?"	2024	—	95	—	Non-album singles
"just call me"	2024	—	—	—	Non-album singles
"Hairclips"	2025	—	—	—	People EP
"Mongoose"	2025	—	—	—	Cheerleader
"Beginners luck"	2025	—	—	—	Cheerleader
