= Isabel Hardman =

British journalist

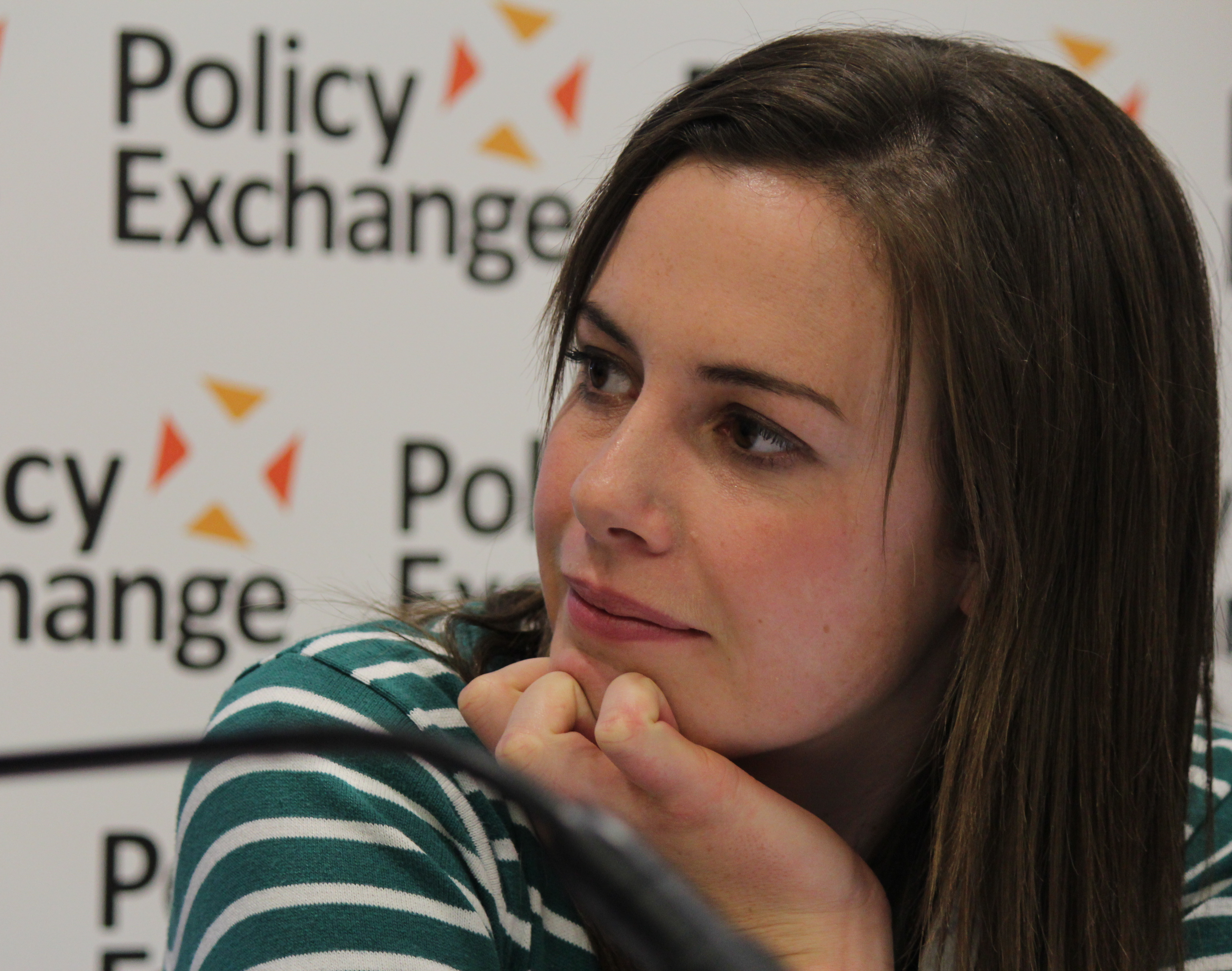
- Hardman chairing a Policy Exchange debate, September 2014
- Born: 5 May 1986 (age 40); Camden, London, England
- Education: University of Exeter
- Occupation: Journalist
- Known for: Assistant editor, The Spectator
- Spouse: John Woodcock (m. 2021; sep. 2026)
- Children: 1

Isabel Hardman (born 5 May 1986), is a British political journalist and the assistant editor of The Spectator. In 2015, she was named Journalist of the Year at the Political Studies Association's annual awards.

== Early life ==
Born in Camden, Hardman is the daughter of Michael Hardman, the first chairman and one of the four founders of the Campaign for Real Ale. She was privately educated at St Catherine's School, Bramley, and then state educated at Godalming College, before graduating from the University of Exeter with a first-class degree in English literature in 2007. While at university, Hardman worked as a freelance journalist for The Observer. She completed a National Council for the Training of Journalists course at Highbury College in 2009.

== Career ==
Hardman began her career in journalism as a senior reporter for Inside Housing magazine. She then became assistant news editor at PoliticsHome, moving to The Spectator in 2012. Hardman also wrote a column for the Evening Standard on nature in London from 2020 until 2021.

She is an assistant editor of The Spectator. She has also written columns for the i paper on health policy. In radio, she is a presenter of the BBC Radio 4 programme Week in Westminster and in early July 2023, she became political commentator at Times Radio.

In television, she has appeared on programmes such as Question Time, The Andrew Marr Show and Have I Got News for You.

Hardman has also written books. In 2018, she released Why We Get The Wrong Politicians, this was followed by The Natural Health Service, in 2020, and Fighting for Life in 2023. Why We Get The Wrong Politicians won the award for best political book by a non-parliamentarian at the Parliamentary Book Awards 2018. That year, it was also shortlisted for the Waterstones Book of the Year award and the Orwell Prize.

In September 2014, GQ magazine named her as one of their 100 most connected women in Britain, and in December 2015, she was named "Journalist of the Year" at the Political Studies Association's annual awards.

== Personal life ==
In April 2016, Hardman tweeted that a male member of Parliament had referred to her as "the totty" and that she had reported him to the whips. She was not intending to name the man who was subsequently reported to be the Conservative MP Bob Stewart.

Hardman has written about suffering from depression, and in October 2016 wrote that she had stopped working temporarily due to anxiety and depression. She has said that, in 2017, she was diagnosed with post-traumatic stress disorder, due to a serious trauma in her personal life. She wrote that her recovery was partly down to time spent outdoors: she is a cold-water swimmer, and in 2019 ran the London Marathon for Refuge, raising £37,000 for the charity.

Hardman began a relationship with the politician John Woodcock in summer 2016. In November 2019, Woodcock announced he and Hardman were expecting a child. Hardman gave birth to a son on 12 May 2020. On 30 July 2021, the couple married. The couple announced their separation in 2026..

== Bibliography ==
- Hardman, Isabel (2018), Why We Get the Wrong Politicians, Atlantic Books, London, UK ISBN 978-1782399735
- Hardman, Isabel (2020), The Natural Health Service, Atlantic Books, London, UK ISBN 978-1786495907
- Hardman, Isabel (2023), Fighting for Life, Viking, Edinburgh, UK ISBN 978-0241504345
