= Waterloo and South Bank =

- Electoral ward for the Lambeth London Borough Council
- Waterloo and South Bank ward boundaries since 2022
- Borough: Lambeth
- County: Greater London
- Population: 8,858 (2021) (Note: 2021 Census data reported for 2022 ward boundaries)
- Electorate: 6,178 (2022)
- Major settlements: Waterloo
- Area: 1.188 square kilometres (0.459 sq mi)

Current electoral ward
- Created: 2022
- Number of members: 2
- Councillors: Ibrahim Dogus; Doug Buist
- Created from: Bishop's
- GSS code: E05014118

Waterloo and South Bank is an electoral ward in the London Borough of Lambeth. The ward was first used in the 2022 elections. It returns two councillors to Lambeth London Borough Council.

== List of councillors ==
| Term | Councillor | Party |
|---|---|---|
| 2022–present | Ibrahim Dogus | Labour |
| 2026–present | Doug Buist | Liberal Democrats |

== Lambeth council elections ==
=== 2026 election ===
The election took place on 7 May 2026.

2026 Lambeth London Borough Council election: Waterloo and South Bank (2)
| Party | Candidate | Votes | % | ±% |
|---|---|---|---|---|
| Labour | Ibrahim Dogus | 678 | 16.2 | |
| Liberal Democrats | Doug Buist | 626 | 14.9 | |
| Labour | Oliviero Veneri-Thomas | 596 | 14.2 | |
| Liberal Democrats | Elin Kingston | 594 | 14.2 | |
| Green | Celeste Hicks | 538 | 12.8 | |
| Green | Gay Lee | 507 | 12.1 | |
| Reform | Adam Anderson | 207 | 4.9 | |
| Reform | Simon Cassey | 195 | 4.7 | |
| Conservative | Oliver Pateman | 128 | 3.1 | |
| Conservative | Katherine Tack | 122 | 2.9 | |
| Turnout | | 4,191 | 34.0 | |
| Labour hold | | Swing | | |
| Liberal Democrats gain from Labour | | Swing | | |

=== 2022 election ===
The election took place on 5 May 2022.

2022 Lambeth London Borough Council election: Waterloo and South Bank (2)
| Party | Candidate | Votes | % | ±% |
|---|---|---|---|---|
| Labour | Sarina da Silva | 842 | 43.3 | |
| Labour | Ibrahim Dogus | 781 | 40.2 | |
| Liberal Democrats | Doug Buist | 714 | 36.7 | |
| Liberal Democrats | Chris French | 713 | 36.7 | |
| Green | Gay Lee | 214 | 11.0 | |
| Conservative | Martin Peel | 213 | 11.0 | |
| Green | Nicola Smedley | 208 | 10.7 | |
| Conservative | Katherine Tack | 205 | 10.5 | |
| Turnout | | 2,003 | 32.3 | |
| Labour win (new boundaries) | | | | |
| Labour win (new boundaries) | | | | |
