= Owain James =

British trade union leader

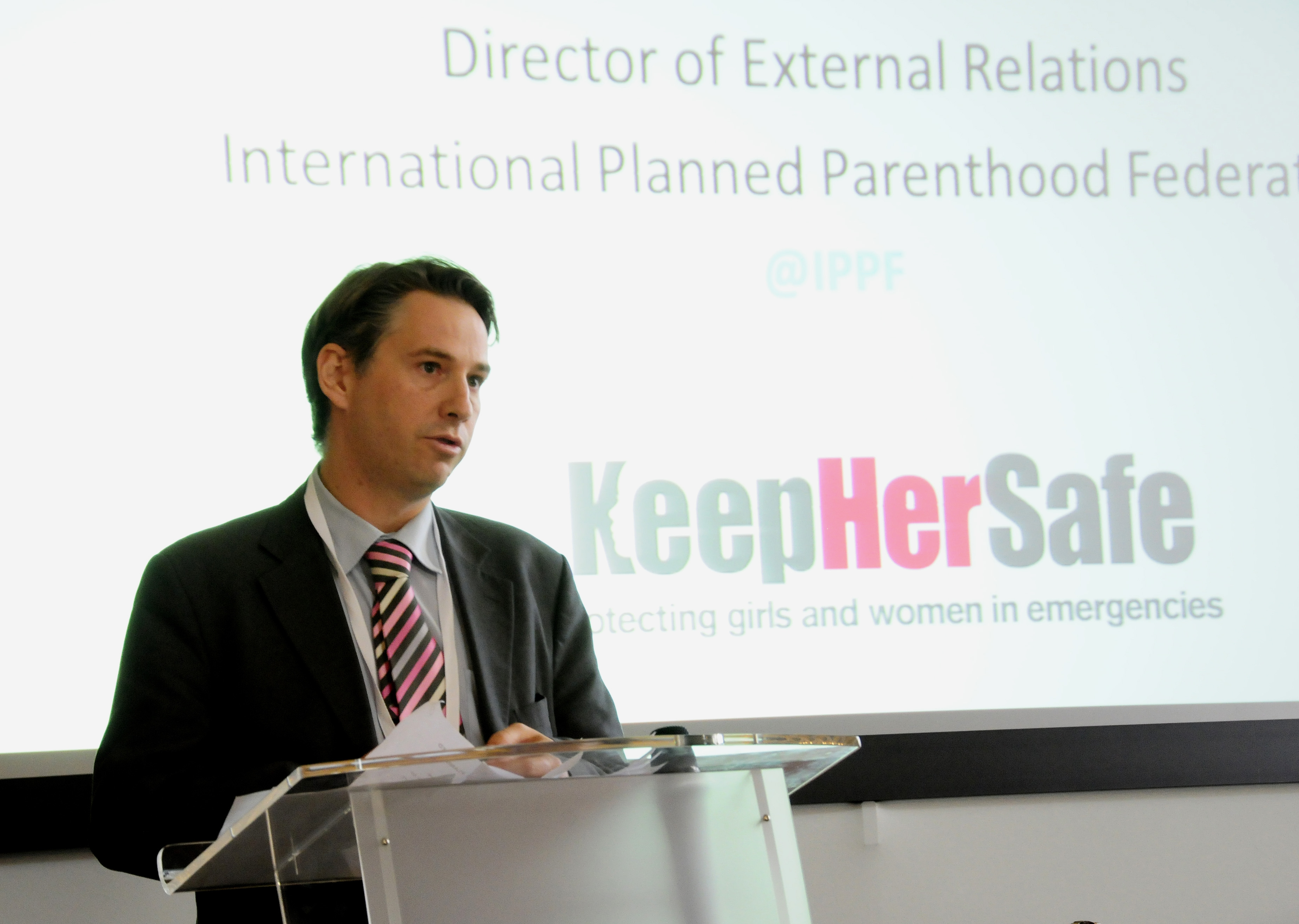
- James in 2013

49th President of the National Union of Students
- In office 2000–2002
- Preceded by: Andrew Pakes
- Succeeded by: Mandy Telford

Personal details
- Education: University of Warwick

Owain James (born April 1976) is the Director of the Kailash Satyarthi Children's Foundation in London. He was previously Director of External Relations for the International Planned Parenthood Federation. Prior to that he was the global coordinator for the Global Campaign for Education between 2006 and 2012. He was president of the NUS from 2000 to 2002.

== Early life ==
He attended Ffynone House School, on St James Crescent in Swansea, taking GCSEs in 1992 and A-levels in 1994.

James graduated from the University of Warwick in 1998, in mathematics, operational research, statistics and economics.

=== NUS ===
He was elected as President of the National Union of Students of the United Kingdom between 2000 and 2002.

== Career ==
After the NUS, James worked for Oxfam as their Education Campaign Manager and then their Millennium Development Goals Campaign Manager. James was Campaign Manager for the Make Poverty History White Band campaign and manager of Global Call to Action Against Poverty, the international arm of Make Poverty History.

=== Global Campaign for Education ===
Between 2006 and 2012, James was appointed Coordinator for the Global Campaign for Education (GCE). The GCE's stated mission is to ensure that governments deliver a free quality public education to all. He ran a campaign called 1 Goal around the 2010 World Cup.

Political offices
Preceded by Andrew Pakes	President of the National Union of Students; 2000-2002	Succeeded by Mandy Telford
