= Centre for Kurdish Progress =

The Centre for Kurdish Progress is a platform for discussing issues affecting Kurdish-speakers in the UK and Kurdish regions in the Middle East. It was founded in 2014 by Ibrahim Dogus, who has also founded the Centre for Turkey Studies think tank. The Centre for Kurdish Progress holds regular discussion events, some of which are held within the UK Parliament buildings. The centre also organises an annual celebration of the Kurdish New Year, Newroz, in conjunction with the Most Successful Kurds in Britain Awards ceremony.
