= Mandy Telford =

British trade unionist (born 1976)

50th President of the National Union of Students
- In office 2002–2004
- Preceded by: Owain James
- Succeeded by: Kat Fletcher

Personal details
- Born: Amanda Telford; 5 June 1976 (age 50) Falkirk, Scotland
- Party: Scottish Labour
- Spouse: John Woodcock (m. 2004; div. 2015)
- Education: University of Strathclyde

Mandy Telford (born 5 June 1976) is the former President of National Union of Students from 2002 to 2004, having served the previous two years as President of NUS Scotland. She was the fifth woman to hold the NUS presidency and was twice elected as the Labour Students candidate.

== Early life ==
Telford was born in Falkirk and attended the Scottish private school Dollar Academy. She studied at the University of Strathclyde from 1996 until 2000 and for her final year was vice-President of the Students' Association at the Jordanhill campus.

== Career ==
=== NUS ===
Telford served as NUS Scotland's women's officer before being elected to serve two consecutive one-year terms as President of NUS Scotland from 2000 to 2002. As President of the National Union of Students from 2002 to 2004, Telford led the campaign against the Labour government's controversial policy to charge university top-up fees, becoming a regular writer for The Guardian and a broadcaster on BBC Radio 5 Live.

=== Political career ===
Telford worked for the British trade union Amicus (now part of UNITE the union) as coordinator of the anti-bullying Dignity at Work campaign and was special adviser to Tessa Jowell, Minister for the 2012 Summer Olympics.

In 2013, Telford was elected as a councillor in Cumbria County Council for Walney South, Barrow-in-Furness. She resigned in January 2015.

As the Scottish Labour candidate, Telford contested the Falkirk West constituency in the 2016 Scottish Parliament election, where she received 6,980 votes and finished in second place behind the Scottish National Party. She contested Edinburgh West in the 2017 UK general election, receiving 7,876 votes and finishing fourth to the Scottish Liberal Democrats, SNP and Scottish Conservatives respectively.

Telford has been a member of the Progress strategy board.

== Personal life ==
Telford was married to John Woodcock, former MP for Barrow and Furness. They have two daughters. The couple separated in late 2014, and Telford returned to live in Scotland with the children. They divorced in 2015.

Political offices
Preceded by Owain James	President of the National Union of Students; 2002–2004	Succeeded by Kat Fletcher
