= Leah Williamson =

English footballer (born 1997)

Leah Williamson CBE
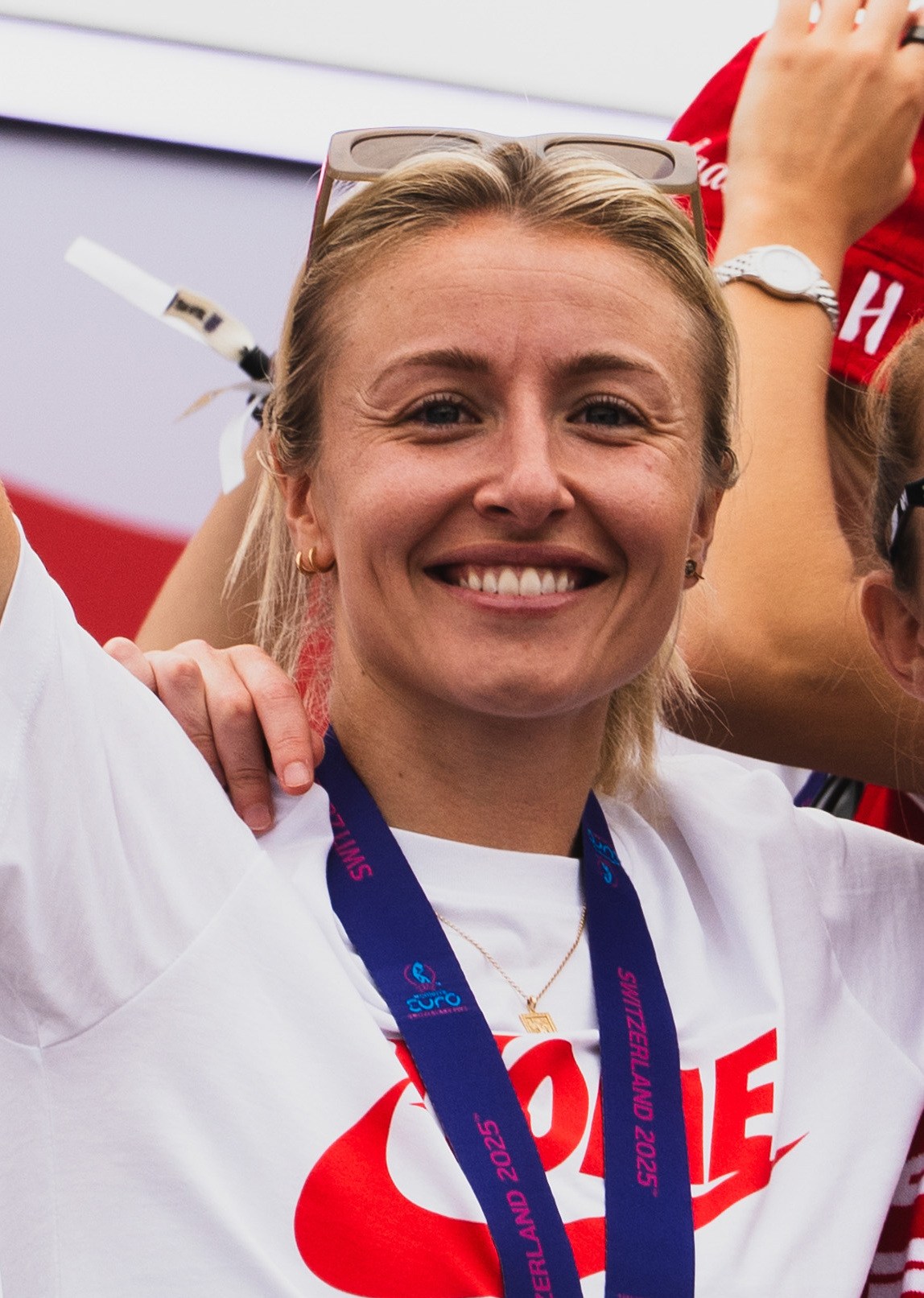
- Williamson in 2025

Personal information
- Full name: Leah Cathrine Williamson
- Date of birth: 29 March 1997 (age 29)
- Place of birth: Milton Keynes, England
- Height: 5 ft 7 in (1.70 m)
- Positions: Midfielder; centre-back

Team information
- Current team: Arsenal
- Number: 6

Youth career
- 2003–2006: Rushden & Diamonds
- 2006–2013: Arsenal

Senior career*
Years	Team	Apps	(Gls)
2014–	Arsenal	181	(11)

International career^{‡}
2010–2011	England U15	1	(0)
2012–2013	England U17	16	(2)
2014–2016	England U19	15	(6)
2014	England U20	3	(0)
2014–2018	England U23	6	(0)
2018–	England	69	(5)
2021–	Great Britain	3	(0)
Medal record
Women's football
Representing England
UEFA Women's Championship
Winner	2022 England
Winner	2025 Switzerland
UEFA–CONMEBOL Finalissima
Winner	2023 England
- * Club domestic league appearances and goals as of 22 November 2026 ‡ National team caps and goals as of 13 October 2026

Leah Cathrine Williamson CBE (born 29 March 1997) is an English professional footballer who plays for Women's Super League club Arsenal and captains the England women's national team. A versatile player, she plays in central defence or in midfield, and has spent her entire senior domestic career at Arsenal.

After being part of Arsenal's youth programme from the age of nine, Williamson debuted for the senior team as a teenager at the end of their 2014 Champions League campaign; she started for them in the League Cup final that year, in which she had individual success. With Arsenal, Williamson has won the League and Champions League once, the FA Cup twice and the League Cup four times. She has captained Arsenal on various occasions and reached 200 appearances for them in December 2022.

Williamson represented England for all their age-group teams before making her senior debut in 2018, for 2019 FIFA World Cup qualifying. She was used sparsely in her first years with England, then became a regular under manager Sarina Wiegman, who also made her permanent captain in 2022. Williamson captained England to their first UEFA European Championship victory, and the women's team's first international title, in 2022, for which she was named in the Team of the Tournament. Williamson captained the Lionesses as they won Euro 2025, becoming England's first captain to lift two major trophies. She also represented Great Britain at the Olympics in 2021.

== Early life ==
Leah Cathrine Williamson was born on 29 March 1997 in Milton Keynes to David and Amanda Williamson and grew up in Newport Pagnell on the northern edge of the urban area, attending Portfields School for primary education and Ousedale School for secondary. She comes from a divided footballing family, with her brother and father fans of North London team Tottenham Hotspur, while she, her mother and grandmother are lifelong fans of rival club Arsenal. Williamson's mother played football when she was younger, cutting her hair short so that she would look like a boy and be allowed to play.

Williamson's first youth team was Scots Youth FC, where she was the only girl on the team.

In 2006, she was selected as the mascot to the Arsenal men's team in a league cup match at the Hawthorns against West Bromwich Albion. Despite being on holiday, her mother drove her the 430 mile round trip from Bude to ensure her dream was fulfilled. She was rewarded with a photo with Arsenal's Theo Walcott. In 2007, she was selected as a mascot for the Lionesses and accompanied Kelly Smith, the captain at the time and a future teammate who Williamson would later follow when she became England captain. Smith autographed a photo for Williamson and told her to "dream big".

After watching long jumper Greg Rutherford, who also comes from Milton Keynes, at the 2012 Summer Olympics, Williamson briefly considered switching her focus to athletics, a sport she had local experience in, inspired to become an Olympic athlete.

== Club career ==
=== Rushden & Diamonds ===
Williamson joined Rushden & Diamonds Centre of Excellence at the age of 6. On that period, Williamson said, "My coach at the time left to go to Arsenal. I went across with her and had a couple of trials and luckily they took me on and I never looked back from there. So I owe it all to my coach from when I was 9."

=== Arsenal ===
Williamson joined Arsenal's Centre of Excellence in 2006 at the age of nine. She considered quitting football at the age of fifteen, skeptical about the possibility of playing professionally.

==== 2014 ====
Williamson made her senior team debut the day after her seventeenth birthday when she came on as an 81st-minute substitution for Rachel Yankey in Arsenal's 0–2 defeat to Birmingham City in the Women's Champions League quarter-final. She made her FA WSL debut on 16 April against Notts County. She won her first major title, the 2014 FA Women's Cup with Arsenal on 1 June in the final against Everton, in which she came on as a 76th-minute substitute for Jade Bailey. On 13 July, Williamson netted her first professional goal for Arsenal in a 4–0 win away against Millwall Lionesses in the League Cup. On 4 September, she scored her first league goal against Chelsea. She made 12 appearances in the 2014 FA Women's Super League. Williamson played in the 2014 League Cup final against Manchester City which Arsenal lost 1–0. At the end of the 2014 season, she was named the League Cup Player of the Year, ahead of Jess Clarke from Notts County, Ji So-yun from Chelsea and Toni Duggan from Manchester City.

==== 2015 ====
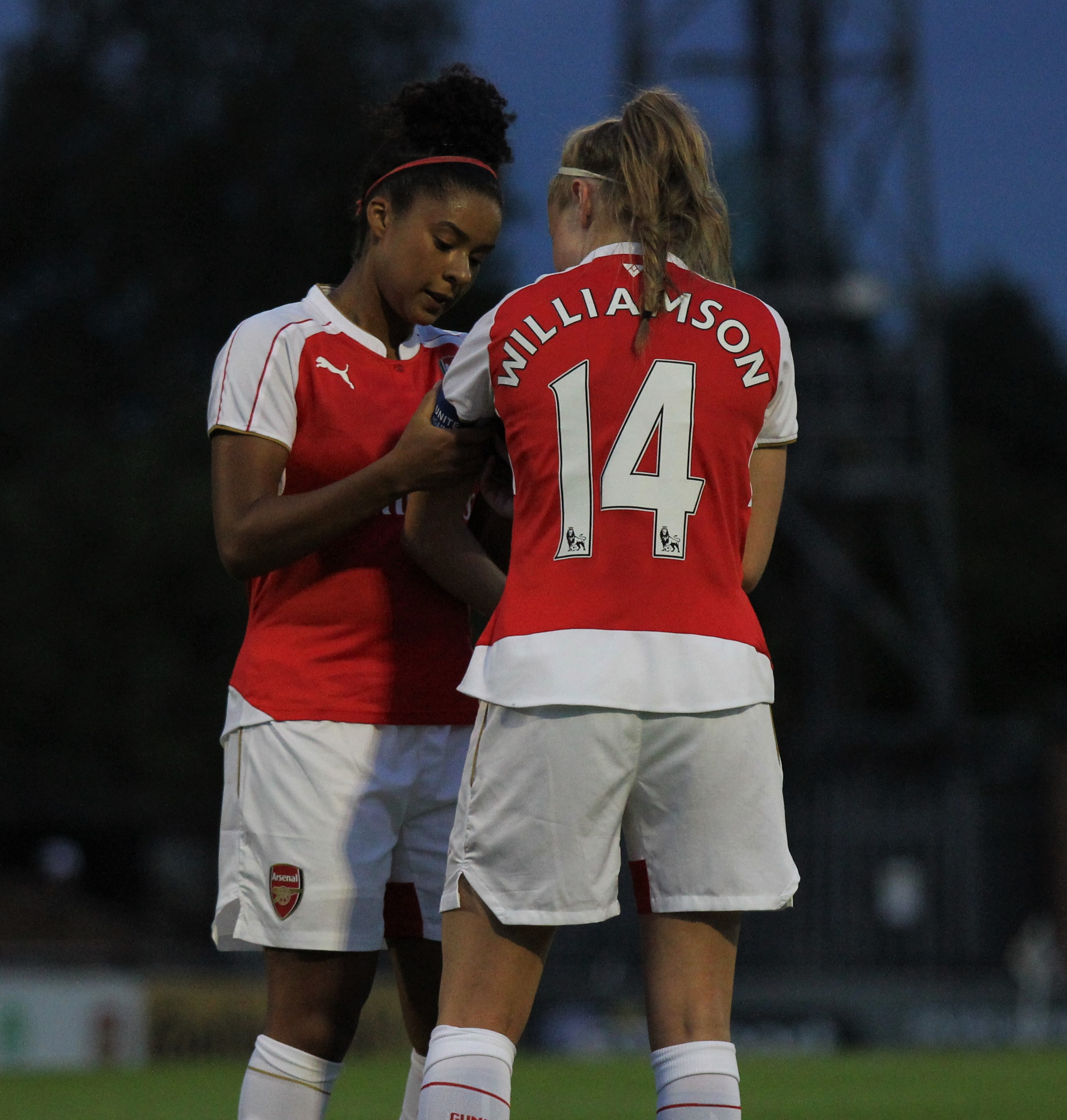
Chiara Ritchie-Williams giving Williamson the captain's armband during a match in 2015

On 8 January, Williamson won the England Women's Youth Player of the Year award. Before the start of the 2015 FA WSL, on 31 March, Williamson signed her first professional contract with Arsenal. On 26 April, she was named the 2014–15 PFA Young Women's Player of the Year. Speaking about Williamson following the award, then-Arsenal head coach Pedro Martinez Losa said “I’ve worked with some of the top players in the world like Kelly Smith and Abby Wambach and when you work with them day by day, you realise what this player can do. Leah is made for big challenges and big things.” Williamson scored her first goal of the season in a convincing 3–0 home victory over Watford in the League Cup on 23 July. Williamson was a key figure in the club's victorious League Cup campaign, after the quarter final win over holders Manchester City, who had beaten Arsenal in the final, Williamson said, "I think Arsenal as a football club have won a lot of trophies in the past and we wanted to keep winning silverware for the club. Even with the younger players in the squad we all thought we have got to win, the morale was certainly high before the game. Last year’s final was always in the back of our mind and we know how good a side City can be. After going 1–0 up it was all about defending which we managed to do and it was a great result for us. I think we can win the cup as we have won it three times but we have to keep on focusing on the next game." Having appeared in 13 out of the club's 14 WSL matches in the 2015 season, on 31 July 2015, it was announced that Williamson had signed a new long-term contract with Arsenal.

==== 2016 ====
Williamson helped her team reach the 2016 FA Women's Cup final, which Arsenal won by a 1–0 margin over Chelsea. On 16 June 2016, Arsenal announced that she had successfully undergone surgery on her ankle.

==== 2017–18 ====
Williamson was ever-present in the 2017–18 Women's FA Cup as Arsenal defeated the defending champions, Manchester City in the final. Arsenal's league campaign was more disappointing with Arsenal missing out a top two finish and Champions League qualification for the sixth consecutive edition of the WSL. She started the season in midfield but switched to central defence with the arrival of new manager Joe Montemurro in December 2017. On her change of position, Williamson said, "I'm not sure in the long term and I never want to shut the door on either position, because I know I can do both. But I'm enjoying playing as a centre back with the way we play. Under Joe we want to play out from the back and that suits my qualities. At the minute I am enjoying playing at centre half, but I'm open minded about what the future holds." Towards the end of the season, Williamson reflected on the season since Montemurro took over, "I feel like since Joe came in we're back on a journey again, we had lost that a little bit. Despite today, I feel like we're building something. But pretty much every game we have played since around November has been a must win game and that takes its toll emotionally. In every single game we have known no less than a win will do, in the league and in the cups."

==== 2018–19 ====
On 14 October 2018, Arsenal laid down a marker in their title challenge with a 5–0 thrashing of champions Chelsea, inflicting a first home defeat on the champions since July 2016. Joe Montemurro began utilizing Williamson on the right of a back three and after a 4–0 win at Bristol City on 28 October, in which Williamson assisted Jordan Nobbs for one of the goals, he commented positively on her performance. Arsenal won their first nine games and went into the match with Manchester City six points clear of their title rivals; however, they lost 2–0 amid an injury crisis. Two games later, on Williamson's 100th Arsenal appearance, a 2–1 defeat to Chelsea allowed Manchester City to move a point clear albeit having played one game more.

On 23 February, Arsenal attempted to defend their title in the 2019 FA Women's League Cup final, but Manchester City won 4–2 on penalties; nevertheless, Montemurro praised Williamson after the match. In the league, Arsenal won four games in a row, and after a 5–1 victory at Liverpool on 24 March, England manager Phil Neville indicated his confidence that Williamson would one day captain the national team. The team won another four games in a row to clinch the title with a 4–0 defeat of Brighton at the Falmer Stadium on 28 April. During the season, the most common passes exchanged were between Williamson and Lisa Evans at right wing back. Williamson took the most touches out of any Arsenal player, with 1,501, and completed the most passes in the opposition’s half (591). She also made thirty interceptions, more than any other player in the squad.

==== 2019–20 ====
Williamson was voted to the PFA Team of the Year for 2019–20. Due to the COVID-19 pandemic, the season was cut short and Chelsea were announced the eventual winners.

==== 2020–21 ====
On 13 September 2020, Williamson netted her first goal of the season in Arsenal's 9–1 victory over fellow London side West Ham United. On 18 November, Williamson made her 150th appearance in all competitions for Arsenal against Tottenham Hotspur in the League Cup, a game which Arsenal would draw 2–2 but go on to win 5–4 on penalties.

==== 2021–22 ====
On 16 June 2021, Arsenal announced that Williamson had signed a new one-year contract with the club until the end of the 2021–22 season, with Williamson saying the decision to stay following the departure of manager Joe Montemurro had been tougher than before. On November 13, she suffered a signfificant hamstring injury in the match against Tottenham Hotspur. Teammate Lotte Wubben-Moy dedicated her goal in the next game to Williamson. She returned to play after two months.

Just seven months after signing the one-year contract, in January 2022, she agreed to a prolonged contract with the club. Arsenal did not disclose the duration of the new commitment, but coach Jonas Eidevall stated that Williamson is "a player for us to build Arsenal around".

==== 2022–23 ====
On 21 April, she announced her injury from two days prior was a ruptured ACL, ruling her out of the Champions League and the Women's World Cup later that year.

==== 2023–24 ====
Williamson returned from injury on 21 January 2024 to play in the League Cup against Reading, where she came on as a substitute for Jen Beattie in the 61st minute and assisted a goal in the 6–0 win. In May 2024, Williamson signed a new contract with Arsenal. The duration of the contract was not disclosed. Speaking about the new contract, Williamson said "“Everyone knows what Arsenal means to me, but I think every time I sign a new contract, I feel that love ignite all over again. I’m very happy to be staying and looking forward to the next couple of years."

==== 2024–25 ====
Williamson was ruled out of both the opening WSL game against Manchester City and Champions League game against BK Häcken, due to concussion protocol. Following a tough start to the season, Williamson faced heavy criticism on social media about her performance.

On 14 March, during Arsenal's match against Everton, Williamson broke the record for the number of appearances for her club in the WSL. She had made 158 appearances, 146 of which were starts for the club. On May 24, she won the UEFA Women's Champions League with Arsenal, in a 1–0 win against Barcelona.

==== 2025–26 ====
On 21 August 2025, it was announced Williamson would miss the start of the 2025–26 season, after undergoing knee surgery to clean up an injury sustained in the Euros final. She returned to the pitch on 13 December 2025, coming on as an 82nd minute substitute in a 3–1 victory over Everton.

On 30 April 2026, Arsenal announced that Williamson had signed a new contract with the club, which the BBC reported as a two-year deal.

== International career ==
=== England ===
==== Youth ====
Williamson has represented England since 2010 at youth levels. As a midfielder, she was first called up to train with the under-15 team for a thirty-player camp in April 2010, and was retained for the new season in August 2010. She captained the England under-17 side in the 2014 UEFA Under-17 Championship (held in November and December 2013), where they eventually finished fourth; they lost on penalties in the third place play-off against Italy, with Williamson scoring one of England's three to Italy's four and being included in the team of the tournament. She was also part of the under-20 team to compete in the 2014 FIFA U-20 World Cup in Canada in August 2014. Williamson featured in the starting lineup in each England game, though they exited in the group stage without winning a match.

On 9 April 2015, Williamson scored a penalty for her team in a qualifying match against Norway for the 2015 UEFA under-19 championship, which had been ordered to be retaken five days after the original contest. In an unprecedented decision, UEFA had ordered the match to be restarted from the 96th minute.

Previously, on 4 April, Williamson's successful penalty for England was disallowed for player encroachment (by substitute Rosella Ayane, who had won the penalty and scored a goal in her brief cameo from the bench). The laws of the game state that in such a situation, the penalty should be retaken, but the German referee, Marija Kurtes instead awarded Norway a free kick. After protests from the England camp, the European governing body agreed that the match should be replayed from the time of the incident.

The players returned to finish the last two minutes of their match after each had played what was scheduled to be their last qualifying matches for the tournament. With the scores standing at 2–1 to Norway, Williamson equalised and, in doing so, booked her team's place in the tournament finals.

==== Senior ====
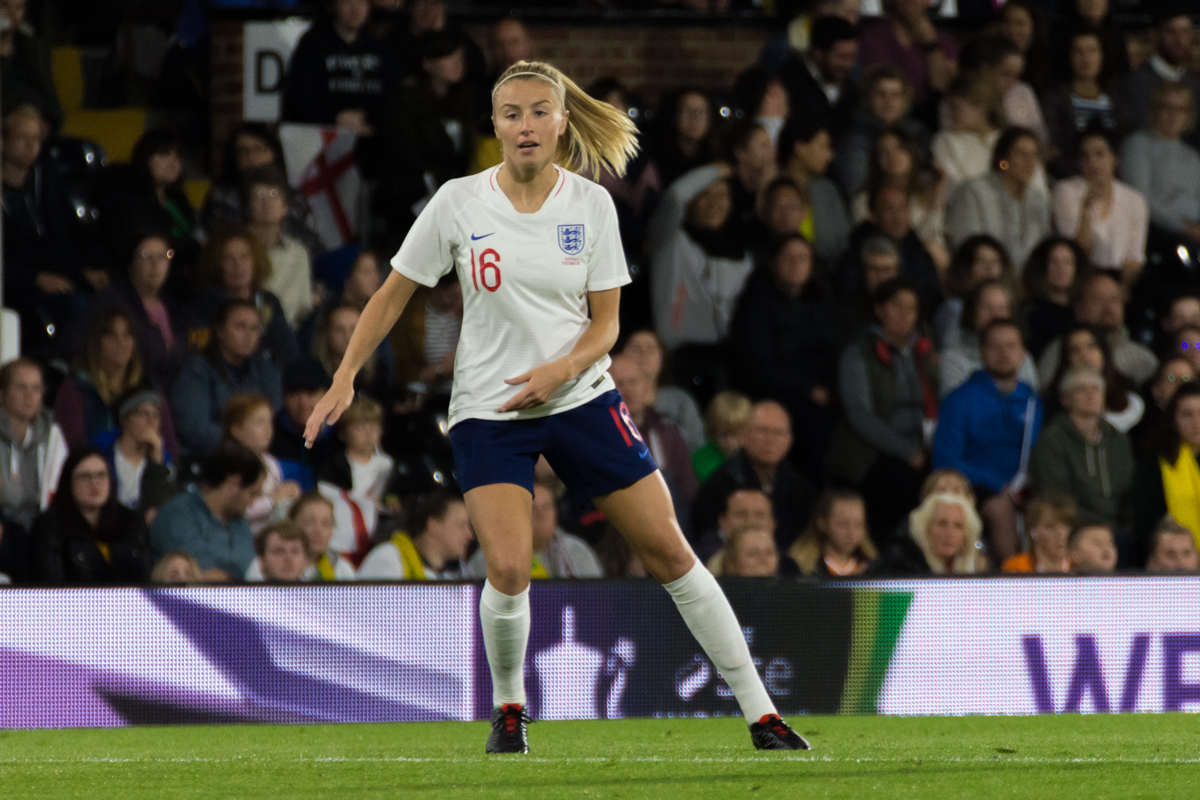
Williamson with England in 2018

In November 2017, Williamson was called up to train with the senior England squad. She then travelled with the team to the 2018 SheBelieves Cup in the United States in March 2018, without being available for the squad, as part of the development pathway. On 8 June 2018, she made her debut for the senior team coming on for Walsh with six minutes left in their 2019 FIFA World Cup qualifier against Russia, which England won 3–1. She had her first senior start in September that year, in a 6–0 victory over Kazakhstan.

She was part of the England squad that won the 2019 SheBelieves Cup, playing in the final game, a 3–0 win over Japan, and was part of the squad that defeated Denmark 2–0 in one of their final friendly preparation matches for the World Cup. She was then selected for the 2019 FIFA World Cup, with Ian Wright announcing her selection in May 2019. On being selected, Williamson said that she had aimed to go to a World Cup after seeing the previous edition in Canada, considering herself lucky to be called up. She made her World Cup debut from the bench in the Round of 16 match against Cameroon on 23 June 2019. Then-manager Phil Neville felt he did not use Williamson as much as he could have during the qualifiers and World Cup, putting in more experienced defenders and considering Keira Walsh crucial to the defensive midfield instead.

Williamson scored her first England goal, an 86th-minute winner, in a 3–2 friendly win against the Czech Republic on 12 November 2019.

On 17 September 2021, Williamson was named England captain for the FIFA World Cup qualifier against North Macedonia at St Mary's Stadium, Southampton. On 5 April 2022, she was appointed permanent England captain; previous captain Steph Houghton had suggested Williamson was one of the players who could eventually take over as captain even before the 2019 World Cup. Williamson captained the England squad which won the UEFA Women's Euro 2022; she made the most ball recoveries in the competition and was named to the Team of the Tournament.

She was the 205th player to represent the England women's team, with this announced as her legacy number on 18 November 2022, the 50th anniversary of the team.

As European champions, England qualified to contest the first Women's Finalissima; on 6 April 2023, Williamson captained the Lionesses to another international title by defeating Brazil on penalties after 90 minutes.

On 19 April 2023, Williamson sustained an injury in Arsenal's 1–0 Women's Super League loss to Manchester United. The injury was later revealed to have been an anterior cruciate ligament, meaning she would miss the rest of the season and the 2023 World Cup in Australia and New Zealand. During her period of recovery, Williamson learned how to play the piano and performed with the BBC Concert Orchestra for the BBC Sport digital show Out Of Office, which follows players pursuing interests off the pitch. She made her comeback in April 2024, against the Republic of Ireland.

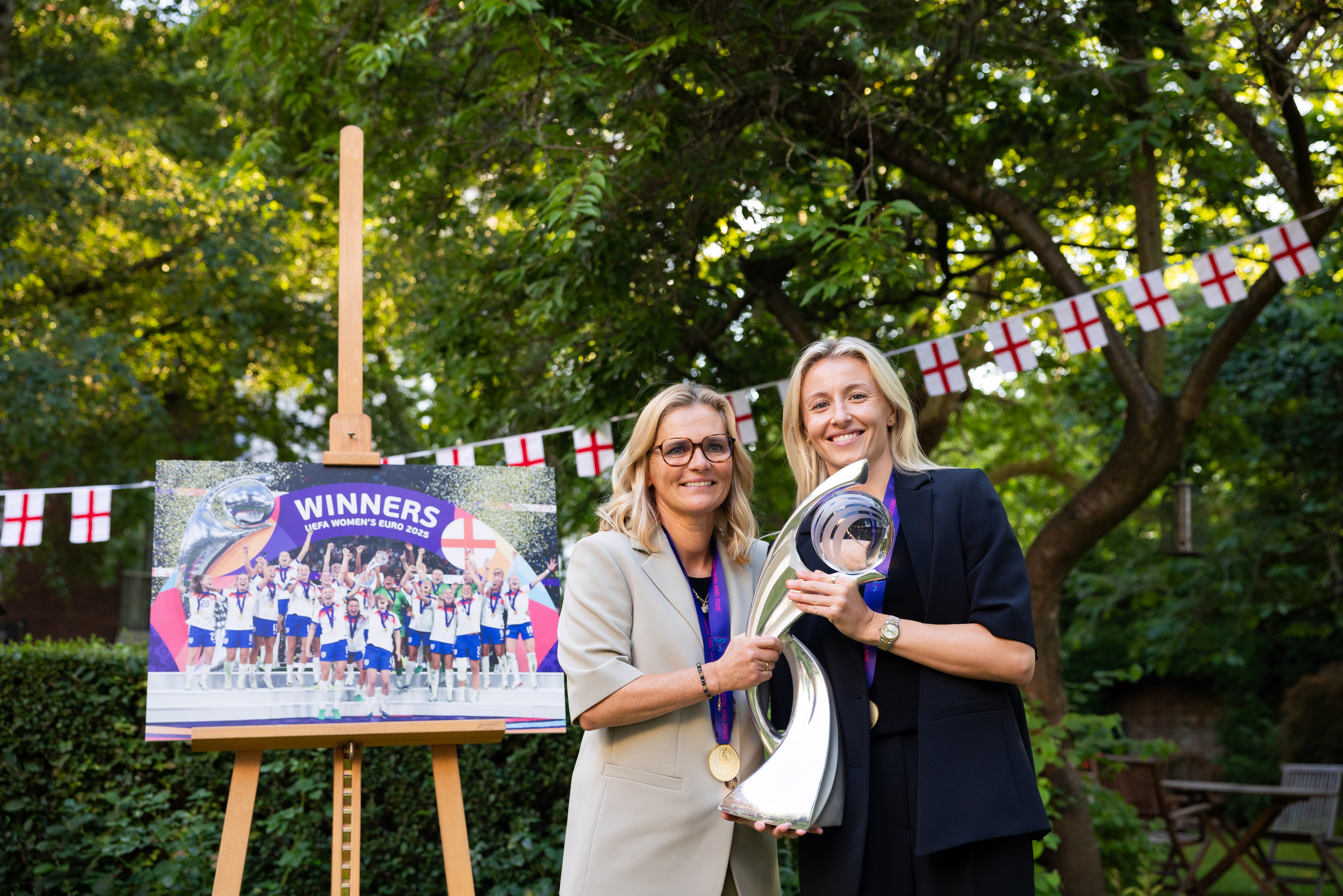
Williamson (right) and Sarina Wiegman with the UEFA Women's Euro 2025 trophy

Williamson achieved her 50th England cap on 29 October 2024, against South Africa, and scored a goal in their 2–1 victory. On 5 June 2025, she was named to England's squad for UEFA Women's Euro 2025. On 27 July 2025, Williamson started in the tournament's final and captained England to a win on penalties over Spain to win a second consecutive European Championship.

She made her return from knee injury to the Lionesses in February 2026, being called up ahead of 2027 FIFA Women's World Cup qualification matches against Ukraine and Iceland in March.

=== Great Britain ===
Williamson played for the Great Britain Olympic football team at the Tokyo 2020 Summer Olympics (held in 2021). She was proud of her defensive work in the team's group games, and of being an Olympian, saying she had to close her eyes when the camera passed her during the anthem as she was tearing up. Williamson has said that a shift in her mentality came when GB was knocked out of the Olympics, not wanting to feel the same disappointment, "she recognised what she needed to do to fulfil her potential" in terms of the demands of international competition.

== Style of play ==
Williamson has been praised by numerous news outlets due to her ability to regain possession for her team without having to tackle her opponent. In Euro 2022, she completed the championships having recovered the ball 56 times and having completed 472 passes, in both cases doing so more than any other player in the tournament. Another article describes Williamson as the "epitome of a modern-day ball-playing centre back", citing her ability to anticipate opponent's passes and also to predict her teammates' attacking runs so that she can play a precise forward pass among her strengths. She also has by far the highest rate of passes into the final third for a defender in the WSL since 2021, with a November 2022 Arsenal technical report saying that "she wrecks the curve" for this statistic due to the margin.

== In popular culture ==
In Williamson's hometown, Newport Pagnell, a mural of her was completed in August 2022. The artwork was painted on a former garage by professional street artists. As part of the "Where Greatness Is Made" campaign, a plaque honouring Williamson was installed at Scot Sports & Social Club in Milton Keynes. She was one of the legends of football featured in Nike's "The Football Verse" ad spot for the 2022 FIFA Men's World Cup. She guest wrote about the England men's football team at this tournament for The Athletic.

In 2022, she was one of the honourees of the British GQ Men of the Year Award. She appeared as a special guest on The Graham Norton Show on New Year's Eve 2022, his 30th series. In 2023 she appeared on CBeebies Bedtime Story reading Remarkably You by Pat Zietlow Miller.

In July 2023, Williamson helped to design and launch the current version of Blue Peter's Sport badge.

In August 2024, Williamson opened a new football pitch, in her home town, in her honour, known as the Leah Williamson Pitch.

== Activism and charity work ==
Williamson frequently uses her platform for social justice, although she has said: "I'm uncomfortable with the way the word activism is used, because I think it's just how normal people should behave."

Williamson wore a Stonewall rainbow armband throughout the 2022 Euro in support of LGBTQ+ rights.

Because of controversies relating to the 2022 Men's World Cup, Williamson said that while she would still "support the boys [she has not] got any interest in it as a fan really this year, which is sad."

The day after England triumphed at the 2022 Euros, the team wrote an open letter to Tory leadership candidates Rishi Sunak and Liz Truss requesting government support for girls to receive two hours a week of PE lessons and to support resources for girls' football sessions in school. Williamson credited teammate Lotte Wubben-Moy with driving the success of the request.

In August 2023, Williamson travelled to Jordan and visited the largest Syrian refugee camp in the world in support of the Coaching for Life programme. Afterwards, she spoke about how the programme is empowering girls and transforming male attitudes to gender stereotypes.

Williamson was the first England women's footballer to address the United Nations when she appeared at the Sustainability Development Goals (SDGs) Summit in September 2023.

As well as her involvement with Coaching for Life, Williamson is an ambassador for the Willow Foundation.

== Writing ==
Williamson has co-authored six books to date:

=== Non-fiction ===
You Have the Power: Find Your Strength and Believe You Can (2023) – A positive guide for empowering young girls, written with sports journalist Suzanne Wrack.

=== Fiction ===
The Wonder Team and the Forgotten Footballers (2023) – A time-travel adventure for children aged 8–12, written with Williamson's cousin Jordan Glover; illustrations by Robin Boyden. This is the first of a three book deal Williamson signed with Macmillan Children's Books. There are currently four sequels in The Wonder Team series.

Williamson was a special guest editor of The Beano, in an edition celebrating 70 years since Minnie the Minx's first appearance.

== Personal life ==
Williamson was training to be an accountant but has reportedly put her studies on hold to focus on football.

She is close friends with former Arsenal teammate Alex Scott, and international teammate Keira Walsh. Williamson and Walsh went through all the England junior ranks together and received their first senior call up on the same day in 2017; in 2019, Williamson commented that whenever England teams were announced "the first thing you do, you check for your name on the list and then you check for Keira's." Walsh also reflected that there was "nobody [she] would rather have shared this journey with".

Williamson has endometriosis, which made her anxious to play while menstruating, and has spoken about it to increase awareness of the disruptive condition and the need for more symptom-relieving measures. She is part of the LGBTQ community; as of 2024, she is in a relationship with former Miss USA, American model Elle Smith.

== Career statistics ==
=== Club ===
As of match played 22 November 2026.

Appearances and goals by club, season and competition
Club	Season	League			FA Cup		League Cup		Europe		Total	
Club	Season	Division	Apps	Goals	Apps	Goals	Apps	Goals	Apps	Goals	Apps	Goals
Arsenal	2014	WSL	13	1	4	0	7	1	1	0	25	2
Arsenal	2015	WSL	7	0	2	0	4	1	—		13	1
Arsenal	2016	WSL	8	0	4	0	0	0	—		12	0
Arsenal	2017	WSL	7	0	2	0	—		—		9	0
Arsenal	2017–18	WSL	17	1	4	0	7	0	—		28	1
Arsenal	2018–19	WSL	19	1	2	0	6	1	—		27	2
Arsenal	2019–20	WSL	15	1	4	0	6	1	4	0	29	2
Arsenal	2020–21	WSL	20	1	4	1	3	0	—		27	2
Arsenal	2021–22	WSL	18	2	2	0	1	0	7	1	28	3
Arsenal	2022–23	WSL	12	1	2	0	3	0	7	0	24	1
Arsenal	2023–24	WSL	9	0	1	0	3	0	0	0	13	0
Arsenal	2024–25	WSL	19	2	2	0	2	0	13	0	36	2
Arsenal	2025–26	WSL	6	1	1	0	1	0	5	0	13	1
Arsenal	2026–27	WSL	11	0	0	0	—		5	0	16	0
Career total			181	11	34	1	43	4	42	1	300	17

=== International ===
Statistics accurate as of match played 13 October 2026.

Year	England		Great Britain	
Year	Apps	Goals	Apps	Goals
2018	4	0	—N/a	
2019	10	1	—N/a	
2020	3	0	—N/a	
2021	7	1	3	0
2022	15	0	—N/a	
2023	4	2	—N/a	
2024	8	1	—N/a	
2025	13	0	—N/a	
2026	5	0	—N/a	
Total	69	5	3	0

As of match played 29 October 2024
Scores and results list England's goal tally first, score column indicates score after each Williamson goal.

List of international goals scored by Leah Williamson
No.	Date	Venue	Opponent	Score	Result	Competition	Ref.
1	12 November 2019	Stadion Střelecký ostrov, České Budějovice, Czech Republic	Czech Republic	3–2	3–2	Friendly	
2	26 October 2021	Daugava Stadium, Liepāja, Latvia	Latvia	8–0	10–0	2023 FIFA World Cup qualification	
3	22 February 2023	Ashton Gate Stadium, Bristol, England	Belgium	2–0	6–1	2023 Arnold Clark Cup	
4	22 February 2023	Ashton Gate Stadium, Bristol, England	Belgium	6–1	6–1	2023 Arnold Clark Cup	
5	29 October 2024	Coventry Building Society Arena, Coventry, England	South Africa	1–0	2–1	Friendly	

== Honours ==
Arsenal

- FA WSL: 2018–19
- FA Women's Cup: 2013–14, 2015–16; runners-up: 2017–18, 2020–21
- FA WSL Cup / FA Women's League Cup: 2015, 2017–18, 2022–23, 2023–24; runners-up: 2018–19, 2019–20
- UEFA Women's Champions League: 2024–25
- FIFA Women's Champions Cup: 2026

England

- UEFA Women's Championship: 2022, 2025
- Women's Finalissima: 2023
- SheBelieves Cup: 2019
- Arnold Clark Cup: 2022, 2023

Individual

- UEFA Women's Under-17 Championship Team of the Tournament: 2014
- England Women's Youth Player of the Year: 2014
- FA WSL Continental Cup Player of the Year: 2014
- PFA Young Women's Player of the Year: 2015
- PFA WSL Team of the Year: 2019–20, 2020–21, 2021–22
- UEFA Women's Championship Team of the Tournament: 2022
- England Women's Player of the Year: second 2021–22
- IFFHS Women's World Team: 2022
- FIFA FIFPRO Women's World 11: 2022
- Freedom of the City of Milton Keynes (honoured 28 February 2023)
- Freedom of the City of London (announced 1 August 2022)
- UEFA Women's Champions League Team of the Season: 2024–25

Orders of chivalry

- Appointed Officer of the Order of the British Empire (OBE) in the 2023 New Year Honours, and promoted to Commander in the Order (CBE) in the 2026 New Year Honours, for services to association football.
