= Kurdistan 24 =

Kurdish television news channel

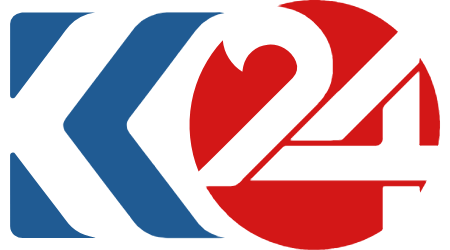
- Country: Iraq
- Broadcast area: Worldwide
- Headquarters: Erbil, Kurdistan Region, Iraq

Programming
- Languages: Kurdish; Arabic
- Picture format: 16:9

Ownership
- Key people: Shaho Tayeb

History
- Launched: 31 October 2015

Links
- Website: kurdistan24.net/en

Availability

Streaming media
- Kurdistan24: kurdistan24.net/ckb/live_tv

Kurdistan24 (K24) is a Kurdish broadcast news station based in Erbil, Kurdistan Region of Iraq, with foreign bureaus in Washington, DC. The service was launched on 31 October 2015. Noreldin Waisy is the founder and former general manager of Kurdistan 24.

Shaho Tayeb currently serves as the General Manager of Kurdistan24, overseeing the channel.

== Television ==
Kurdistan 24 launched its television network on 31 October 2015, aiming to deliver 24-hour news from Kurdistan and around the world to "transform the media landscape of Kurdistan.” The television network covers events across the Greater Kurdistan area and offers analysis on relevant issues in this region.

In addition to political news, Kurdistan 24 offers segments on the Region's culture from all four parts of Kurdistan. It also updates its viewers on news of the sports world.

== Website ==
Kurdistan 24 provides news online in Kurdish (Sorani and Kurmanji), English, Arabic, Turkish, and Persian. Their websites covers news in Kurdistan, the Middle East, and internationally. Kurdistan 24 provides coverage of culture and economy in Kurdistan and abroad.

It also offers its readers a section for original interviews, as well as transcriptions of interviews after they've been aired on the television network. The network also provides readers with regular analysis and opinion pieces covering relevant issues in the Kurdistan Region and the Middle East.

== Radio ==
Kurdistan 24 offers a radio broadcast in Kurdish. This is available in Kurdistan Region and to an international audience as well.

== Controversies ==
Turkey removed three television channels based in Southern Kurdistan, including Kurdish news agency Kurdistan 24, from its TurkSat satellite, allegedly over broadcasting violations during the Kurdistan Region's independence referendum.

The audio/visual media office of the Iraqi government's Media and Communications Commission issued a decree ordering the shutdown of Kurdistan 24 TV broadcast, the banning of its crew and seizure of their equipment across Iraq. The decree claimed the grounds for the move was that Kurdistan 24 is not licensed, and for programs "that incite violence and hate and target social, peace, and security." However, Kurdistan 24 is licensed by the Ministry of Culture of the Kurdistan Regional Government, which under the Iraqi Constitution is empowered to run its own affairs.

== Criticism ==
Kurdistan 24 is described as being affiliated with the Kurdistan Democratic Party, particularly current prime minister Masrour Barzani.
