= British Kebab Awards =

Awards

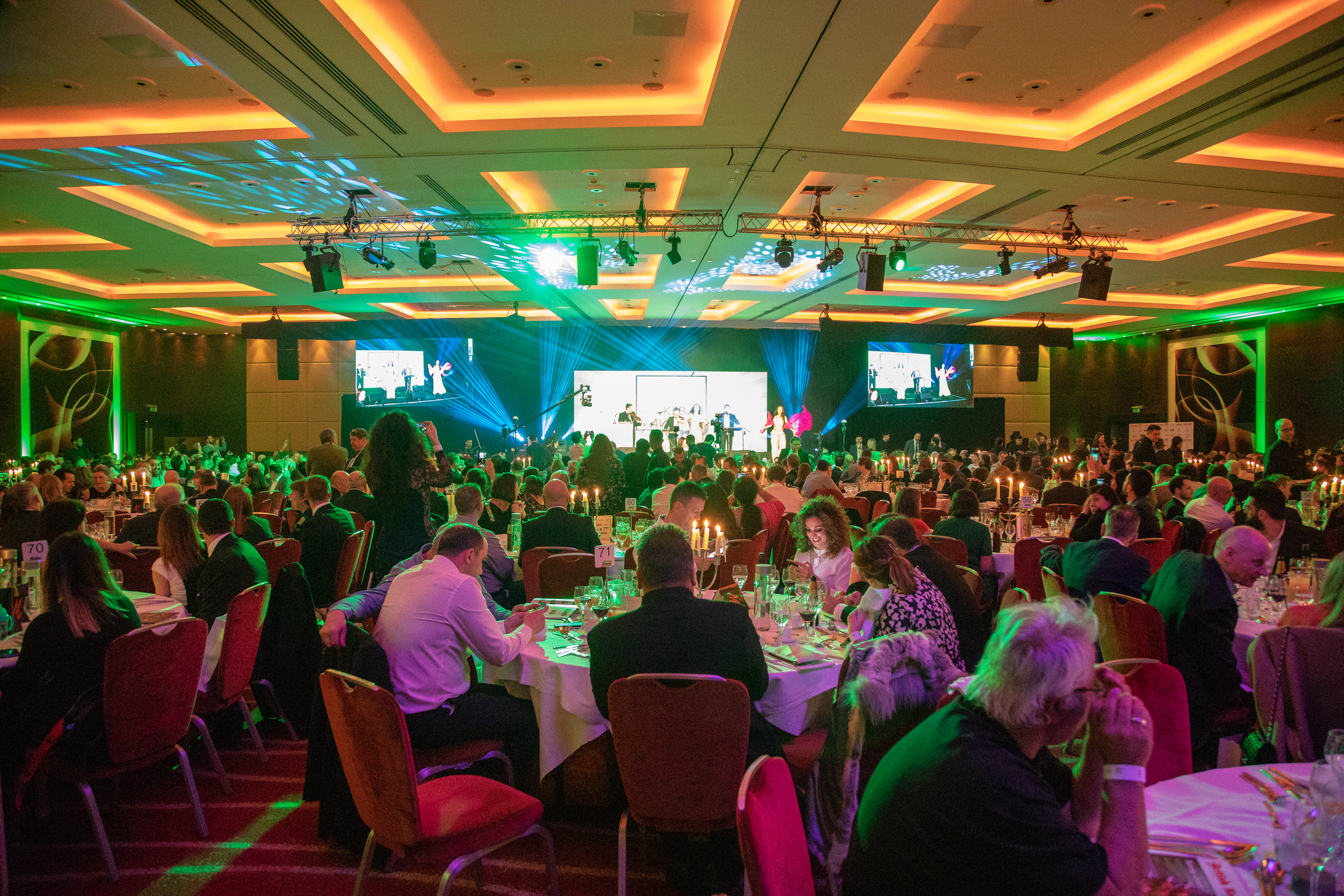
The British Kebab Awards 2019

The British Kebab Awards (colloquially known as the 'kebabbies') are an annual event to celebrate local kebab restaurants across the UK. The awards were founded by Ibrahim Dogus, an entrepreneur, restaurateur and founder of the Centre for Turkey Studies (CEFTUS), in 2013.

Since their creation, the awards have attracted politicians from different political parties to network and present awards, including Labour leader Jeremy Corbyn and Sadiq Khan in 2016. The awards are sponsored by internet fast food delivery provider Just Eat, and have attracted significant attention in both traditional and social media, being dubbed the KeBAFTAs by fans on Twitter.

Founder Ibrahim Dogus is a former waiter, owner of Troia restaurant in Waterloo, London, and the son of Kurdish refugees from Turkey who arrived in the UK in 1994. Dogus became a community activist in the early 2000s, and was shot while trying to combat drug crime in Hackney, where he lived.

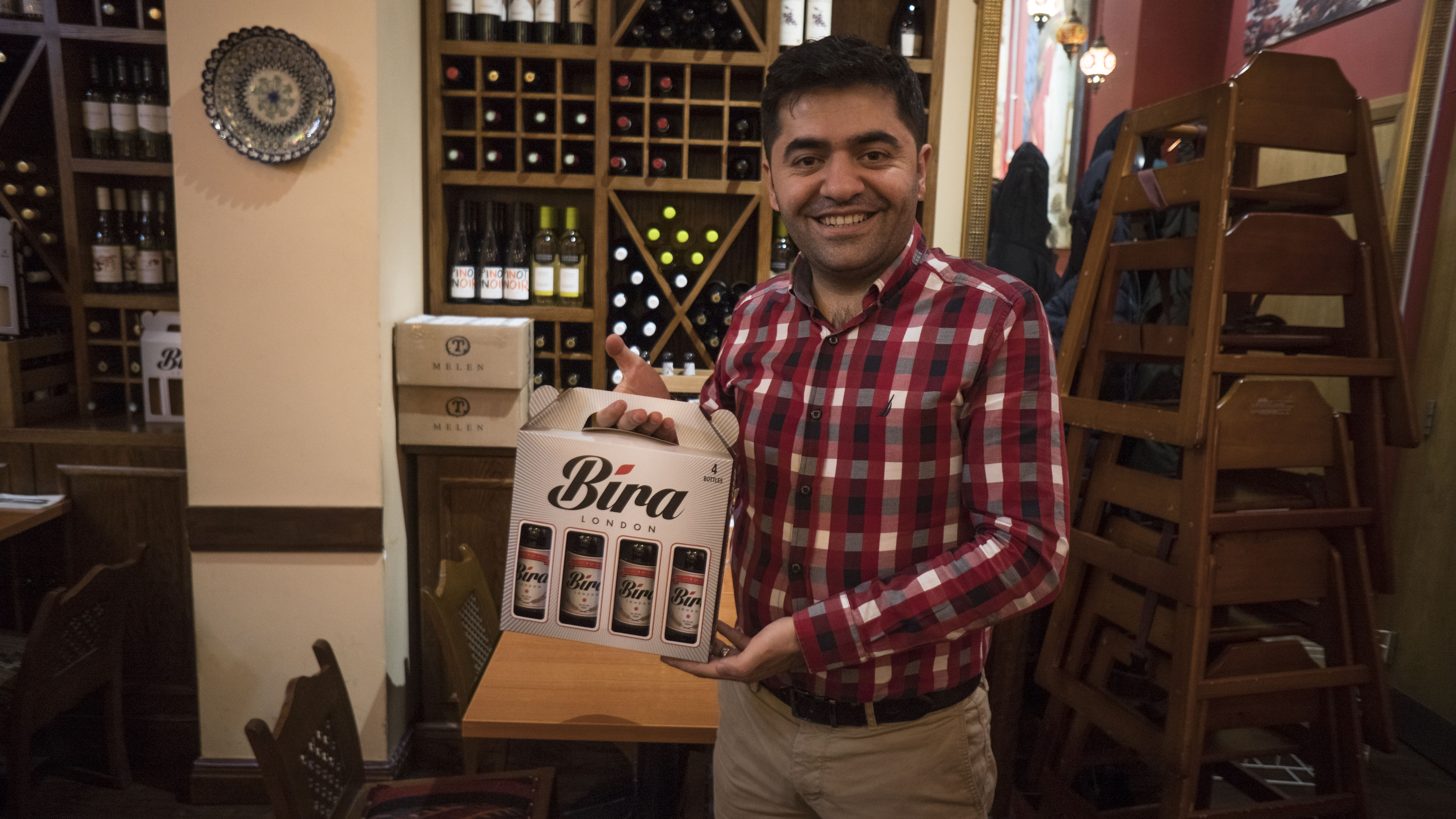
Ibrahim Dogus with a sample of his beer for drinking with kebabs at Troia restaurant, Waterloo

The British Kebab Awards are organised by Dogus' thinktank, CEFTUS, whose aim is to 'build bridges between Turkey and the UK, and between Turkish, Kurdish and Cypriot communities.' The 2017 awards were held at London's Westminster Park Plaza Hotel in February 2017.

In 2016, Dogus announced a business venture to create the first beer made for drinking with kebabs, Bira London. Dogus stated in the programme to the 2017 British Kebab Awards that he believed the uncertainty caused by Brexit would create economic problems for small businesses. In comments at the 2017 awards, Dogus paid tribute to "the places around the world which many of us feel an affinity with (that) have been struck by violence".

The 2019 awards were held on 18 March in London. Labour leader Jeremy Corbyn attended the 2019 awards, giving a speech in which he said that he liked kebab shops, despite being a vegetarian, stating: "I love having a falafal wrap in a kebab shop." Other political guests included Angela Rayner, Bob Seely and Mark Francois. The Daily Mirror noted that the awards ceremony has "become a popular event on the Westminster calendar".
