= Ibrahim Dogus =

British Labour politician

Cllr Ibrahim Dogus
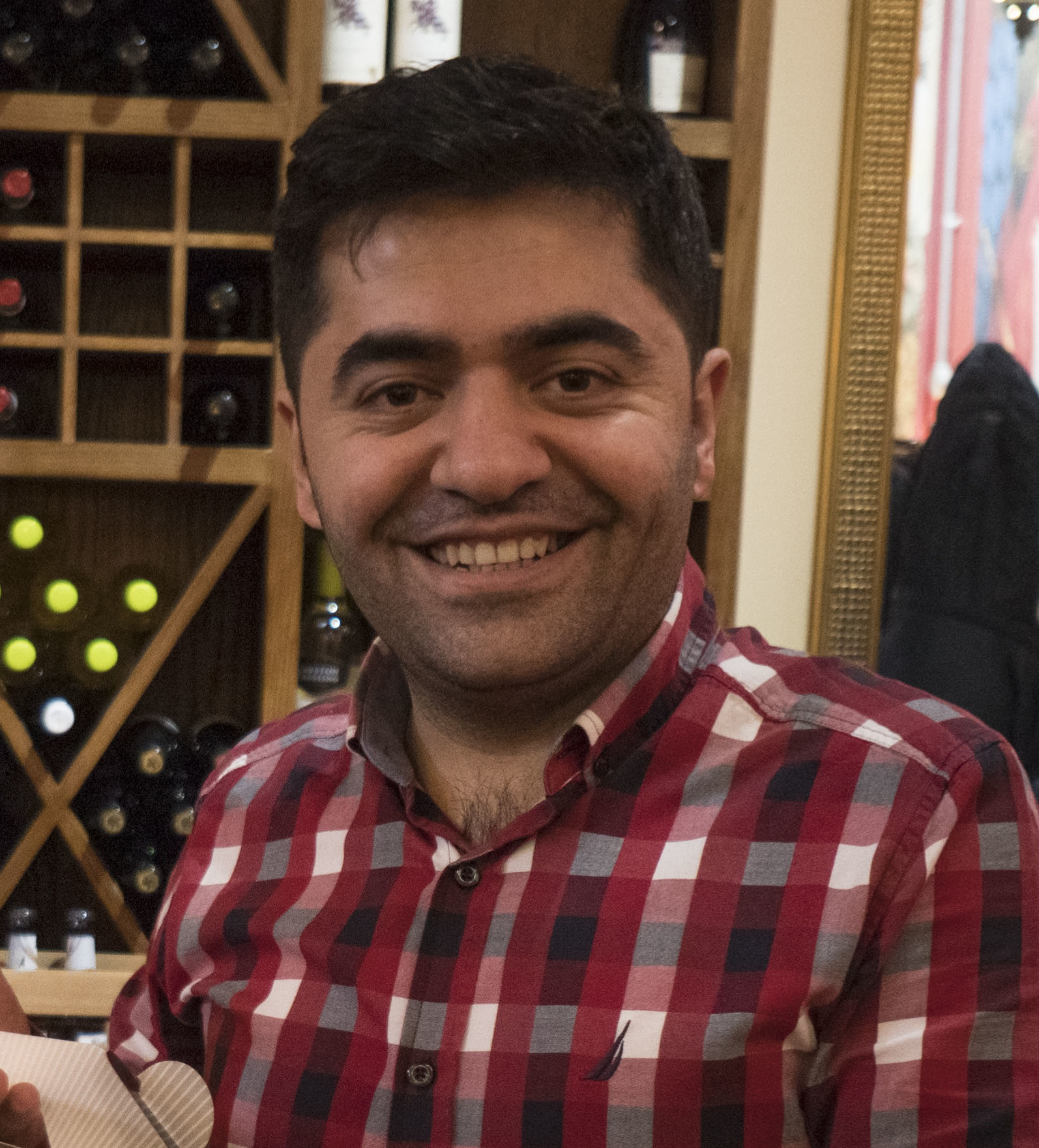
- Dogus in 2017

Councillor for Waterloo and South Bank Bishop's (2018–2022)
- Incumbent
- Assumed office 3 May 2018
- Preceded by: Ben Kind

Personal details
- Born: July 1980 (age 45) Turkey
- Party: Labour
- Spouse: Raife Dogus
- Children: 3 sons

Ibrahim Dogus (born July 1980) is a Turkish-born British politician, entrepreneur and restaurateur. He is founder of SME4Labour. He is also founder of the Centre for Turkey Studies and Centre for Kurdish Progress, and an active organiser for the Turkish and Kurdish community in London and the UK. He is also a British Labour Party politician, serving as a Lambeth Borough councillor. Dogus was the parliamentary candidate for the Labour Party for the Cities of London and Westminster constituency in the June 2017 UK general election and for West Bromwich East at the 2019 general election.

== Career ==
=== Business ===
Dogus took over the restaurant Troia on London's South Bank after university. He now owns three restaurants: Troia, Westminster Kitchen, and Cucina, all close to Westminster Bridge. He attracted media attention in 2017 when he fed hundreds of emergency service workers for free at Troia in the wake of the 2017 Westminster attack: all three of his restaurants were located in the cordoned-off exclusion zone near the attack. In 2019 he launched "With Love", a "pay-it-forward cafe" where the extra customers pay supports the homeless and struggling families.

Since January 2019, Dogus has been targeted by far-right groups and even received death threats after the restaurants he founded included on the bottom of their receipts the message: "Brexit is bad. Immigrants make Britain great. They also cooked and served your food today." TripAdvisor had to suspend reviews of Westminster Kitchen.

Dogus is the owner of the beer brand Bira, which is produced under contract by Molson Coors UK, and marketed as the world's first beer made as an accompaniment to kebabs.

In December 2019, The Times published an investigation into tax evasion by Dogus in connection to his businesses. The investigation stated that in 2011, Dogus was forced to surrender thousands of pounds in cash after attempting to smuggle it out of the country via his aunt for the purpose of "unlawful conduct" including "tax evasion." In the subsequent court case, Dogus claimed the cash was legitimate and that he had sent it to Turkey in order to repay his brother-in-law, who had lent him money for his wedding. A spokesman for Mr Dogus said "Mr Dogus rejects, in the strongest possible terms, any allegation of wrongdoing or illegality. He condemns any individual, organisation or business that does not pay its taxes fully. Throughout the case that took place almost a decade ago, Mr Dogus sought to cooperate fully with the court and instructed his solicitor and legal team to do the same."

Dogus founded the Centre for Turkey Studies (CEFTUS), a non-partisan thinktank aiming "to build bridges between the UK and Turkey and the region." It also organises the British Kebab Awards, which aims to promote cross-community dialogue as well as the Kurdish-dominated kebab industry: "Greeks, Cypriots, Turks, Kurds, they all sit together side by side. They eat and they talk." The British Kebab Awards have been presented by several prominent figures including Jeremy Corbyn, Sadiq Khan, Dan Carden, Joan Ryan, Angela Rayner and Tim Roache and have been sponsored by Just Eat. Dogus is also chairman of the British Takeaway Campaign. He is also founder of the Centre for Kurdish Progress.

=== Politics ===
Dogus' connection with the Labour Party goes back to when he was sixteen, when he was invited by a teacher to address an NUT meeting, to talk about Kurdish human rights. His local MP, Jeremy Corbyn, was the other speaker, and Dogus began campaigning for him. Dogus became a commentator on Turkish, Kurdish and UK politics. and became an activist on Turkish and Kurdish politics in the early 2000s.

Dogus was the parliamentary candidate for the Labour Party for the Cities of London and Westminster constituency in the June 2017 UK general election, having previously stood unsuccessfully for selection in Enfield Southgate in 2014 to contest the 2015 general election. Despite not being elected, Dogus gained a 9.25% swing for Labour, in line with the national average; and finished in second place with 14,857 votes (38.4%), which was the closest any Labour candidate had come to winning the seat.

The following year he was elected as a member of Lambeth London Borough Council for the Bishop's ward, and in May 2018 he was selected by Labour to be the next deputy mayor of the borough, becoming Mayor in April 2019. He was re-elected in 2022 to represent the Waterloo and South Bank ward.

Dogus supported Yvette Cooper in the 2015 Labour Leadership election, helping to raise £2,200 for her campaign Dogus hosted a fundraiser for Owen Smith at one of his restaurants during the 2016 Labour Leadership election. Jeremy Corbyn celebrated his victory in the same place.

Within Labour, Dogus founded the SME4Labour group and the Labour Campaign for Gambling Reform.

In October 2019, Dogus was shortlisted to be the Labour candidate for the seat of Vauxhall in South London, losing out to Florence Eshalomi. In November 2019, Dogus was selected as the prospective parliamentary candidate for West Bromwich East following the decision by the incumbent MP and Deputy Leader of the Labour Party, Tom Watson, to resign at the 2019 general election. He lost the seat to the Conservative candidate, Nicola Richards following a 12% swing toward the Conservatives.
