= Morpeth House =

House in Ipswich, England

Coordinates: 52.0597°N 1.1670°E

Morpeth House is a large house in the east of Ipswich, England. It is situated on Lacey Street near the old Odeon. The grounds are about 3/4 of an acre and have many old trees and interesting features.

== Stamp room ==
The Stamp Room created by Charles Whitfield King was a former library that was wallpapered in 1892 with 44,068 stamps (total face value £699 16s 9d) by a decorator engaged exclusively for 3 months working 11 hrs a day, and the original owner of the house had a bookcase removed in 1894 and the extra space used for another 5474 stamps. The stamps were arranged in mosaics and interesting shapes over the walls. All that survives now is over the mantelpiece; a decorative 1892 with a mosaic pattern surround. Nowadays only a section above the fireplace is still covered with stamps.

== Billiard room ==
The Billiard room is an octagonal room that used to house the full size snooker table that the Whitfield Kings owned. The roof was in a bad state of repair; it proved impossible to make its lantern windows watertight and it proved too expensive to replace. The roof was removed and the room was turned into a "Secret Garden". The stage area has been used for a few concerts.

== Timeline of owners ==
1887–1959, Whitfield King family three generations:

- 1887, Charles Whitfield King (1855-1930)
- 1930, Charles Whitfield King (1887-1944)
- 1945, James Charles Whitfield King (1921-1982)
- 1959–1977, Ms Goddard Dance School (billiard room used as dance hall and stamp room as dressing room)
- 1977–2004, home of the Capey Family (8 children)
- 2004–2016 home of the Gwinnutt Family
- 2016-now home of the Barradell family

== Whitfield King ==
Whitfield King built the house and the building opposite to be used as the centre of his stamp business. He was a very successful businessman and sold millions of stamps from Ipswich. He employed 17 people in the building including sorters of stamps, addressers, cleaners and an engineer to keep the building in good condition. The house was then surrounded by fields and woodland and Lacey Street only had three houses on it but now there are almost 50. In 2014 Morpeth house was granted a blue plaque by the Ipswich society in recognition of Charles Whitfield King the founder of the famous stamp firm, and was unveiled by his great grandson Charles Whitfield King with his daughter Leanne witnessed by many friends relatives and residents of Lacey street at a street party celebration
