= Morpeth Arms =

Pub in Pimlico, London

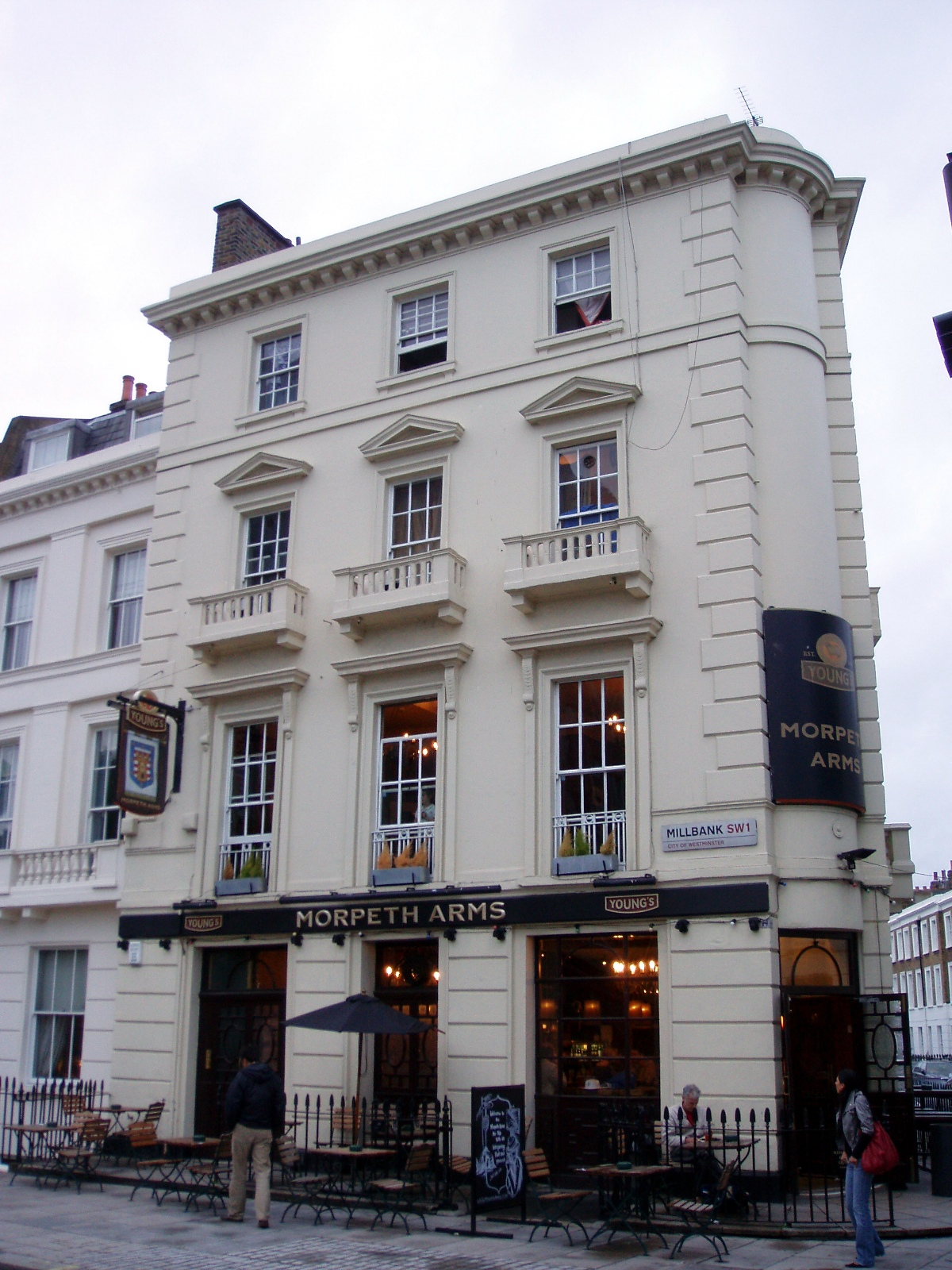
- Morpeth Arms
- Interactive map of Morpeth Arms
- Type: Public house
- Location: 58 Millbank, Pimlico, London
- Coordinates: 51°29′22″N 0°7′43″W
- Built: 1845

Listed Building – Grade II
- Official name: MORPETH ARMS PUBLIC HOUSE
- Designated: 01-Dec-1987
- Reference no.: 1222798

The Morpeth Arms is a public house at 58 Millbank, in the Pimlico district of London. It was built in 1845 to refresh prison warders serving at the Millbank Penitentiary.

It now contains a Spying Room which provides a good view of the headquarters of the Secret Intelligence Service MI6 across the river Thames. The building is listed as Grade II and it is now part of the Young's estate.
