= Centre for Turkey Studies =

UK-based think tank

- Abbreviation: CEFTUS
- Formation: 2011; 15 years ago
- Type: Think tank
- Location: London, UK
- Website: ceftus.org

CEFTUS Logo

The Centre for Turkey Studies (CEFTUS) is a UK-based thinktank which organises discussion events on issues relating to Turkey. CEFTUS, established in 2011 and run by Ibrahim Dogus, also organises events promoting the Turkish, Kurdish and Cypriot communities in the UK, including the Turkish, Kurdish, Cypriot Community Achievement Awards and the British Kebab Awards.

CEFTUS regularly holds events in the UK Houses of Parliament, with well-known thinkers, politicians and journalists focusing on Turkey. CEFTUS strives to operate a non-partisan approach to Turkey's politics, bringing speakers from across the country's political spectrum.
