= Morpeth School =

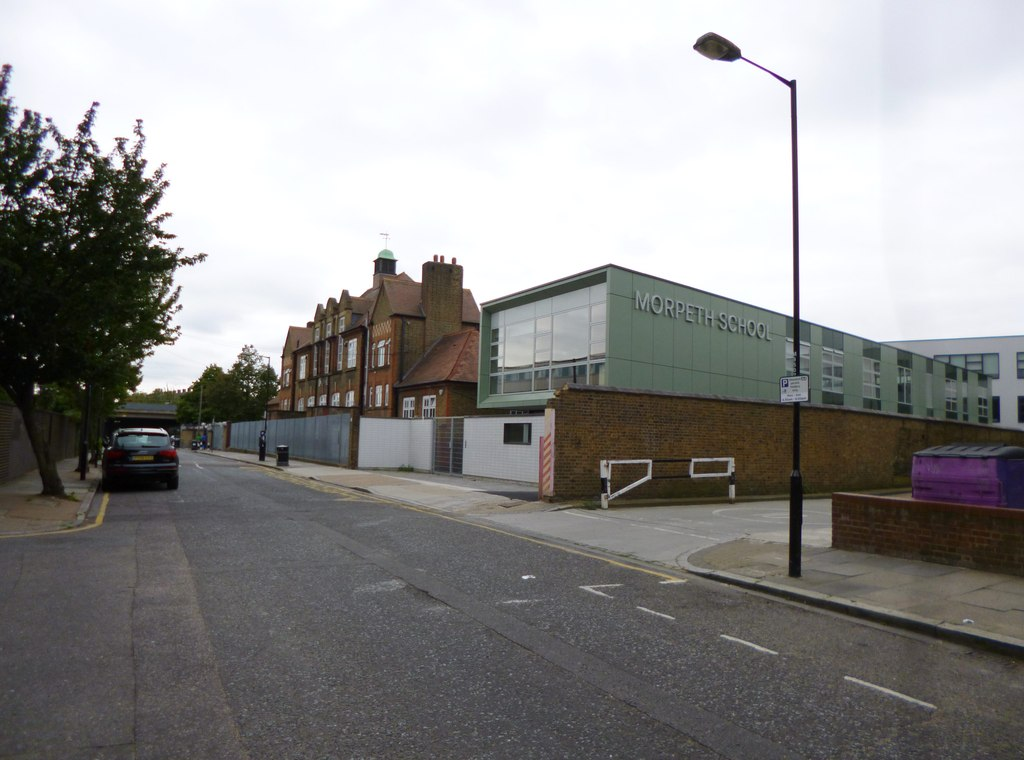
- Morpeth School in 2012

Location
- Portman Place; London, E2 0PX; England; 51.5266°N 0.0476°W

Information
- Type: Community school
- Established: 1910
- Local authority: Tower Hamlets
- Department for Education URN: 100967 Tables
- Ofsted: Reports
- Head teacher: John Pickett
- Staff: 100 teaching; 90 support
- Gender: Mixed
- Age: 11 to 18
- Enrolment: c. 1166
- Houses: 5
- Colours: Light and dark blue
- Website: https://morpethschool.org.uk/

Morpeth School is a comprehensive secondary school and sixth form located in Bethnal Green, London Borough of Tower Hamlets, England. The school serves nearly 1200 pupils.

== History ==
The school was founded by London County Council in 1910 as a central school with the name Morpeth Street School. The school was enlarged in 1927 by taking over premises of a primary school in Portman Place. During WWII the school located to Bury St Edmunds in Suffolk. In the 1960's admission by selection was discontinued and the school became comprehensive. An ex-headteacher of the school, Alasdair Uist Macdonald, was knighted in the 2007 New Year Honours for services to education, with his extensive work on improving the school, by improving teaching skills and achievements by pupils in their SATs and GCSEs results.

In 1997, newly elected British prime minister Tony Blair visited the school. He praised the school's rising GCSE scores.

By 2007, Morpeth's pupils come from a wide range of ethnic backgrounds; over half are from Bangladeshi backgrounds, while one-third are white British.

The Bengali department developed in 2008 new materials for use at all levels in Bengali, which are made available to pupils from Year 8 to Year 9, or for GCSE. The subject is mainly chosen by Bangladeshi pupils, who mainly speak the Sylheti dialect.

In 2009, Ofsted highlighted Morpeth as one of twelve outstanding schools serving disadvantaged communities.

After attending the school end-of-year event in 2013, Church of England clergyman Hugh Rayment-Pickard praised the policy of giving certificates of achievement to all students, instead of holding prize-giving ceremonies to recognise only a small elite, and said that all Church of England schools should do the same. The school does have monthly awards for individuals.

== Notable former teachers ==
The baritone and opera singer, Benjamin Luxon CBE, taught PE and English at Morpeth prior to the start of his singing career in 1962.

== Ethnic groups ==
Morpeth School is located in a part of the East End where there are high numbers of people from many different backgrounds and cultures. Approximately half of all pupils have Bangladeshi heritage, about one third are white British and the remaining pupils are from a wide range of other minority ethnic backgrounds. The number of pupils who speak English as an additional language is quite high. The Ofsted report of 2004, based on the annual school census, showed 50% enrolled were Bangladeshi, 32% White, and 9% Afro Caribbean & mixed race.

== Statistics ==
=== GCSE ===
Percentage of Pupils achieving the Level 2 threshold – equivalent to five GCSEs at grades A* to C including English and maths. In comparison with the Local Authority Average and the National Average:

Year	Morpeth	+/-	Local average	National average
2004	33%	~	28%	42.6%
2005	41%	+8	30.2%	44.3%
2006	48%	+7	33.5%	45.3%
2007	47%	−1	36.3%	46%
2008	54%	+7		

Percentage of pupils achieving A*-C grades in GCSE since 1997. The year 1998 recorded the lowest achievement with only 29% pass-rate, and the year 2006 with the highest at 76% – a gain of 47%.

Year	A*-C
1997	40%
1998	29%
1999	32%
2000	33%
2001	50%
2002	54%
2003	47%
2004	44%
2005	69%
2006	76%
2007	75%
2008	66%

=== Key Stage 3 ===
Percentage of pupils who achieved at the National Average level or above, from 2002:

Year	English	Mathematics	Science
2002	42%	49%	41%
2003	42%	58%	46%
2004	54%	60%	44%
2005	77%	66%	53%
2006	78%	72%	63%
2007	69%	66%	57%
2008	77%	71%	69%

== See also ==
- Education in the United Kingdom
- Education in England
- Tower Hamlets
- Education amongst British Bangladeshi pupils
